= Epirus Army Section =

Field army of the Hellenic Army

The Epirus Army Section (Greek: Τμήμα Στρατιάς Ηπείρου, ΤΣΗ; Tmima Stratias Ipeirou, TSI) was a field army of the Hellenic Army active between 14 February and 20 April 1941 during the Greco-Italian War and the Battle of Greece.

== Establishment and operations, February–March ==
The Epirus Army Section was established on 14 February 1941, with the I Army Corps and II Army Corps fighting on the western and central sections of the Albanian front. Until that point, the two corps had been under the direct control of the General Field Headquarters at Ioannina, led by the Greek commander-in-chief Lt. General Alexandros Papagos. However, the increasing possibility of a German attack through Bulgaria necessitated the relocation of GHQ back to Athens and the establishment of a new higher command. The first commander of the Epirus Army Section was Lt. General Markos Drakos, who until then had commanded the Eastern Macedonia Army Section.

After vehement disagreements with GHQ on the future course of operations, on 6 March Drakos was retired along with his two corps commanders, Lt. Generals Panagiotis Demestichas (I Corps) and Dimitrios Papadopoulos (II Corps). Markos was replaced by the commander of the Western Macedonia Army Section, Lt. General Ioannis Pitsikas. I Corps went to V Corps commander Lt. General Panagiotis Demestichas and II Corps to 3rd Infantry Division commander Major General Georgios Bakos.

From 9–24 March, II Corps faced successive attacks in the Italian Spring Offensive in the Klisura sector, which were repulsed. At the end of March, the Epirus Army Section comprised I Corps, with the 2nd Infantry Division, 3rd Infantry Division and 8th Infantry Division (three Evzone and eight standard infantry regiments) plus a cavalry regiment, and II Corps with the 1st Infantry Division, 4th Infantry Division, 5th Infantry Division, 6th Infantry Division, 11th Infantry Division, 15th Infantry Division and 17th Infantry Division (21 infantry regiments).

== German invasion and collapse ==
Following the start of the German invasion of Greece on 6 April and the rapid progress of the German troops with the capture of Thessaloniki three days later, on 12 April GHQ in Athens gave the order of retreat to the Greek forces on the Albanian front. The decision came too late. The Greek commanders were aware that, given the continued Italian pressure, the lack of Greek motor transport and pack animals, the physical exhaustion of the Greek army and the poor transport network of Epirus, any retreat was likely to end up in disintegration. They had pressed in vain for a retreat already before the start of the German attack but now they petitioned Pitsikas to surrender. Although Pitsikas forbade such talk, he notified Papagos of these developments and urged a solution that would secure "the salvation and honour of our victorious Army". Indeed, the orders to retreat, coupled with the disheartening news of the Yugoslav collapse and of the rapid German advance, led to a breakdown of the morale of the Greek troops, many of whom had been fighting without reprieve for five months and were now forced to abandon hard-won ground. By 15 April, the divisions of II Army Corps, beginning with the Cretan 5th Division, began to disintegrate, with men and even entire units abandoning their positions.

On 16 April, Pitsikas reported to Papagos that signs of disintegration had also begun to appear among the divisions of I Corps and begged him to "save the army from the Italians", i.e. to be allowed to capitulate to the Germans, before the military situation collapsed completely. On the next day, the Western Macedonia Army Section (Lt. General Georgios Tsolakoglou) was renamed to III Army Corps and placed under Pitsikas' command. The three corps commanders, along with the metropolitan bishop of Ioannina, Spyridon, pressured Pitsikas to unilaterally begin negotiations with the Germans. When he refused, the others decided to bypass him and selected Tsolakoglou, as the senior of the three generals, to carry out the task. Tsolakoglou delayed for a few days, sending his chief of staff to Athens to secure permission from Papagos. The chief of staff reported the chaos in Athens and urged his commander to take the initiative in a message that implied permission by Papagos, although this was not in fact the case. On 20 April, Tsolakoglou contacted Obergruppenführer Sepp Dietrich, the commander of the nearest German unit, the Leibstandarte SS Adolf Hitler (LSSAH) brigade, to offer surrender. The protocol of surrender was signed at 18:00 of the same day between Tsolakoglou and Dietrich. Presented with the fait accompli, Pitsikas was informed an hour later and resigned his command.

== Sources ==
- Hellenic Army History Directorate (1997). An Abridged History of the Greek-Italian and Greek-German War, 1940-1941 (Land Operations) (in Greek). Athens: Hellenic Army General Staff, Army History Directorate. ISBN 9789607897015.
- Gedeon, Dimitrios (2001). "Ο Ελληνοϊταλικός Πόλεμος 1940–41: Οι χερσαίες επιχειρήσεις". Ο Ελληνικός Στρατός και το Έπος της Βορείου Ηπείρου. Periskopio. pp. 4–35. ISBN 960-86822-5-8.
- Koliopoulos, Ioannis (1978). "Ο Πόλεμος του 1940/1941". In Christopoulos, Georgios A. & Bastias, Ioannis K. (eds.). Ιστορία του Ελληνικού Έθνους, Τόμος ΙΕ΄: Νεώτερος Ελληνισμός από το 1913 έως το 1941 [History of the Greek Nation, Volume XV: Modern Hellenism from 1913 to 1941] (in Greek). Athens: Ekdotiki Athinon. pp. 411–453. ISBN 978-960-213-111-4.
- Stockings, Craig; Hancock, Eleanor (2013). Swastika over the Acropolis: Re-interpreting the Nazi Invasion of Greece in World War II. BRILL. ISBN 9789004254596.
