= Battle of Korçë =

Part of the Greco-Italian War

Battle of Korytsa
- Part of the Greco-Italian War
- Greek troops in Korçë, Albania, Nov 1940
Date	16–22 November 1940 (6 days)
Location	Korçë, Albania
Result	Greek victory; Italian defensive line at Korcë is broken through; Defeat of the Italian 9th and 11th Army

Belligerents
Italy	Greece

Commanders and leaders
(Kingdom of Italy) Ubaldo Soddu	(Kingdom of Greece) Alexander Papagos

Strength
(Kingdom of Italy) 9th Army (Kingdom of Italy) 11th Army	(Kingdom of Greece) III Corps

Casualties and losses
Unknown killed 1,200 to 2,000 captured 135 field guns captured 30 tanks destroyed 600 machine guns captured	624 killed 2,348 wounded

The Battle of Korçë (Also known as Koritsa/Coriza) was a battle fought during the Greco-Italian War of 1940–41 in the town of Korçë in southern Albania between the defending Italian 9th Army and the attacking Greek III Army Corps. The town had been made the main base of operations for the Italian Air Force.

After the initial Italian invasion starting 28 October had been stopped, Greek forces launched a counter-offensive in early November. The battle for Korytsa formed the first part of the operation against the Italians and marked the final stage of the Greek penetration in the Battle of Morava–Ivan heights sector.

The Italian 9th Army was entrenched around the town, and bombarded the Greek troops, but fierce fighting over two days led to the break-through of the Italian defensive line by the Greeks and its capture. Remnants of the 9th Army itself avoided capture, as the opposing Greek forces were poorly motorized and unable to pursue the retreating Italians. Korçë was one of the first towns that the Axis lost during the Second World War.

The town ultimately fell to German and Italian forces in April 1941, and only returned to being Albanian in 1944.
