= 10th Mechanized Infantry Brigade =

10th Infantry Regiment (10 ΣΠ)
- 10ο Σύνταγμα Πεζικού "10 ΣΠ"
- Camp flag of the 10th Motorized Infantry Brigade
- Active: 1913–1917, 1919–1941, 1946–Present
- Country: Greece
- Branch: Hellenic Army
- Type: Motorized infantry
- Size: Regiment
- Part of: III Army Corps
- Garrison/HQ: Serres, Eastern Macedonia
- Mottos: “Watchmen, be on your guard” Φύλακες γρηγορείτε “Fílakes grigoríte”
- Engagements: Balkan Wars: Second Balkan War; Greco-Turkish War (1919-1922): Greek landing at Smyrna; Battle of Kütahya–Eskişehir; World War II: Greco-Italian War; Battle of Greece; Greek Civil War

The 10th Infantry Regiment "(10 ΣΠ)" (Greek: 10ο Σύνταγμα Πεζικού (10 ΣΠ)) is a motorized infantry Regiment of the Hellenic Army. Headquartered in Serres and subordinated to the III Army Corps, it was formed from the former 10th Infantry Division (Χ Μεραρχία Πεζικού) on 1 July 2004.

== History ==
=== Early 20th century ===
The 10th Infantry Division was originally formed in March 1913, in preparation for the Second Balkan War, where it participated. After the end of the war it was based at Veroia. It remained loyal to the royal government during the National Schism, and was withdrawn to Thessaly. After the Noemvriana, the 10th Infantry Division was again moved to Tripoli in the Peloponnese, where it was disbanded in early 1917. In 1919, following the Greek landing at Smyrna, the Smyrna Division (Μεραρχία Σμύρνης) was formed there, which in November 1920 was renamed as the 10th Infantry Division. The division distinguished itself during the Asia Minor Campaign, particularly in the Battle of Afyonkarahisar–Eskişehir. During the Greek retreat in August 1922, it retreated orderly and evacuated over the Marmara Sea to Eastern Thrace. During the next few years it remained based in Veroia.

It fought during the Greco-Italian War of 1940–41, it was partially mobilised at the time of the Italian invasion. Initially the division came under III Corps but from March 1941 was directly under the command of the Western Macedonian Field Army Section under Lieutenant General Georgios Tsolakoglou. In November 1940 the division took part in the first Greek offensive, the Battle of Morava–Ivan, which successfully liberated several villages. During the withdrawal of Greek forces from Albania in April 1941, after German intervention in the war, some 280 soldiers of the division deserted to surrender. The division afterward began to disintegrate as the main withdrawal routes had been blocked by German spearheads. The division was disbanded after the Greek capitulation in April 1941.

It was re-established at Thessaloniki in 1946 as the 10th Mountain Division (Χ Ορεινή Μεραρχία) and fought in the Greek Civil War under III Army Corps. Renamed to 10th Infantry Division, it was moved to Serres in July 1950, where it remains to this day. It received the honor title "Rupel" in 2000, in memory of the Rupel Fortress.

=== Current use ===
It was reorganized as the 10th Infantry Brigade (10η Ταξιαρχία Πεζικού) on 1 July 2004, coming under the control of I Army Corps, but was reformed as a mechanized infantry unit in November 2009 and subordinated to III Army Corps. It re-acquired a national role after having been reduced to a headquarters-only formation for NATO use.

== Structure ==
- Headquarters Company (ΛΔ/10ου ΣΠ) located at Serres.
- 10th Signals Company (10 ΛΔΒ)
- 10th Engineer Company (10 ΛΜΧ)
- 567th Motorized Infantry Battalion (567 M/Π ΤΠ) at Sidirokastro.
- 518th Motorized Infantry Battalion (518 M/Π ΤΠ) located at Kato Nevrokopi.
- 10th Support Battalion (10 ΤΥΠ)
