= Battle of Morava–Ivan =

Part of the Greco-Italian War

Coordinates: 40°35′N 20°40′E

- Part of the Greco-Italian War
- Kathimerini announcing the "triumph of the Greek arms".
Date	14–23 November 1940 (1 week and 2 days)
Location	Morava mountains, south-east Albania
Result	Greek victory; Greek Army capture Korçë, Gjirokastër, Pogradec, Moscopole

Belligerents
Italy; Albania	Greece

Commanders and leaders
(Kingdom of Italy) Gabriele Nasci	(Kingdom of Greece) Alexandros Papagos (Kingdom of Greece) Ioannis Pitsikas (Kingdom of Greece) Georgios Kosmas

Units involved
(Kingdom of Italy) XXVI Corps; Albanian battalions	(Kingdom of Greece) Western Macedonia Section

Strength
55,000; 200 field guns	70,000; 198 field guns

Casualties and losses
Unknown killed & wounded 1,000+ soldiers, 11 officers and plenty of ammunition captured	624 killed 2,348 wounded

The Battle of Morava–Ivan was the first major Greek offensive in the Greco-Italian War of 1940-1941. It took place on the eastern flank of the Greek-Italian front, where the Italian forces had remained on the defensive during the initial Italian invasion toward Epirus. It was a major success for the Greek forces, not only on operational terms, but also as a morale boost, as the breaching of Morava–Ivan line led to the fall of the city of Korçë to Greek hands, and made news internationally.

== Prelude ==
=== Initial conception ===
The plans for the offensive had been laid by the Greek General Staff before the start of the war. Following the torpedoing of the Greek cruiser Elli by an Italian submarine on 15 August 1940, the Greek authorities became certain that an Italian invasion was imminent and started to assess the situation. Greek intelligence had revealed fairly accurately the Italian disposition of forces in Albania, which showed that the Italian forces planned to attack towards Epirus while keeping a defensive posture on the Macedonian sector. The Greek plan was finalised in the second half of September. The Greek forces in North-Western Macedonia would keep a defensive posture, potentially improving the positions with limited attacks in Albanian ground, until the necessary forces arrived. The objective of the offensive was to boost the morale of the Greek forces and the nation in general, as well as to capture the important transportation centre that was Korçë.

=== 28 October – 13 November ===
The Greek forces available on the sector were the 9th Infantry Division and the 4th Infantry Brigade (soon expanded into the 15th Infantry Division), under the III Army Corps. In the first three days of the war, they were not attacked in any appreciable scale. From 1–6 November, they began their own limited offensives, entering in some places Albania. During these clashes, it was revealed that they faced the Parma, Piemonte and Venezia divisions of the Italian XXVI Corps.

=== Terrain ===
Map of the Greek counter-offensive during the Greco-Italian War.

The terrain was very favourable for defence, although it afforded little strategic depth. The Greek and Italian positions were separated by the Devoll river valley. North of the valley lay the Morava mountain, a continuation of the Gramos mountains, with a maximum altitude of 1,808 metres (1,977 yd). North of the Morava is the Korçë plateau. The Morava massif provided good defensive positions for the Italians but the lack of depth meant that if the defences on Morava collapsed, they had no option but to abandon Korçë and the Korçë plateau and retreat north to the Kandauian mountains. The upper Devoll valley communicated with the Korçë plateau through the Cangonj pass, which was defined by the Morava on the south and the Ivan mountain on the north. The Ivan mountain is steep and reaches the height of 1,770 metres (1,940 yd). Through the Cangonj pass was a paved road and another hard surfaced road, in the southern part of Morava, crossed the mountain towards Korçë.

== Opposing forces ==
=== Greek ===
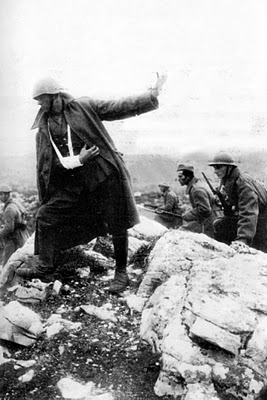
"Greek attack" by Georgios Prokopiou.

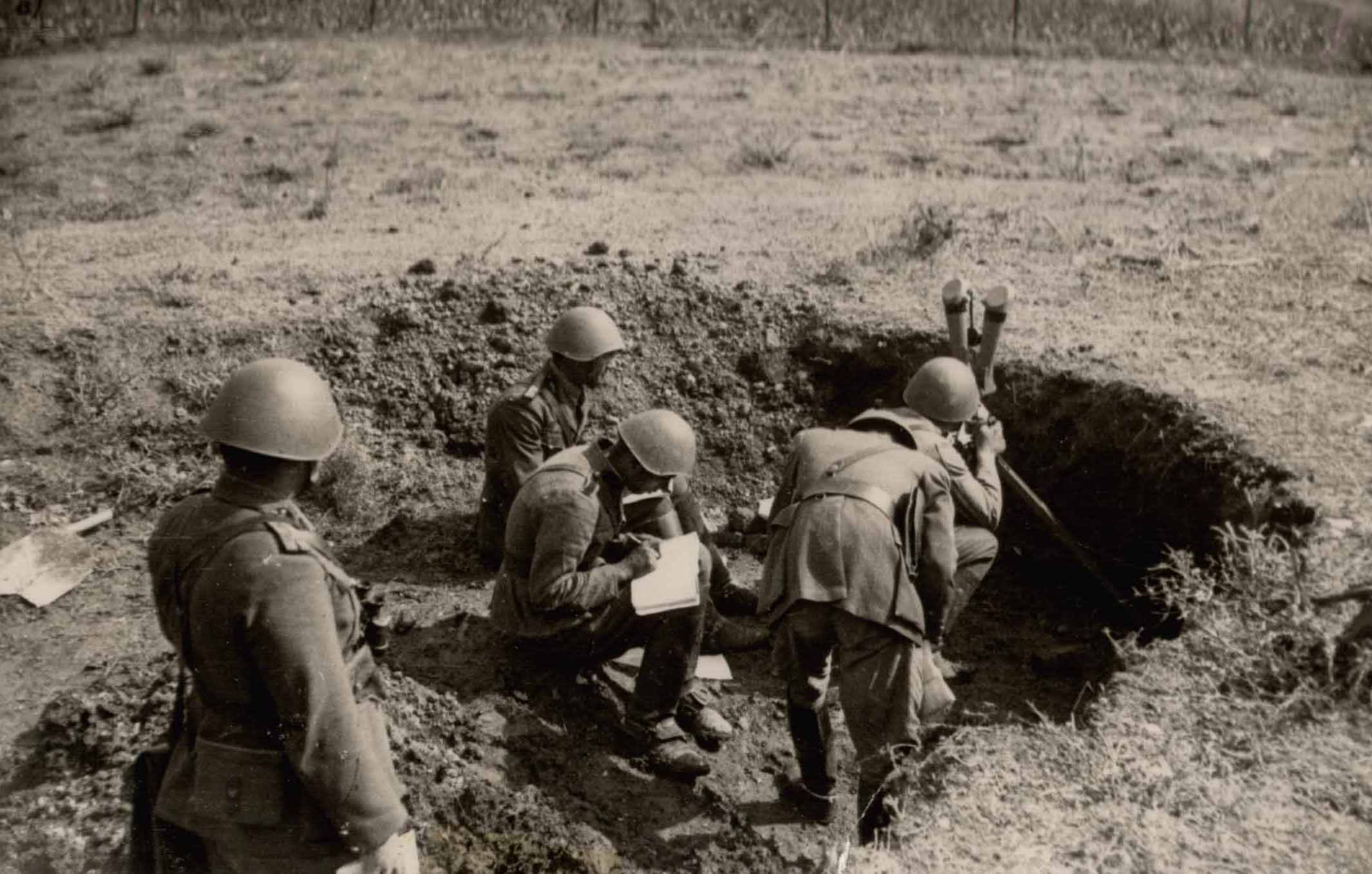
Greek artillery observer

By 13 November, the Greek forces concentrated for the attack were the 10th, 9th and 15th (the former 4th Βrigade) Divisions, all under III Corps commanded by Lieutenant General Georgios Tsolakoglou, which in turn was subordinate to West Macedonia Army Section under Lt. Gen. Ioannis Pitsikas. The 11th and 13th Divisions were on the march to further reinforce the Greek forces. During the battle, the "K" Group of Divisions (Ομάς Μεραρχιών «Κ») was created under Lt. Gen. Georgios Kosmas, taking the 10th and 11th Divisions under its command.

=== Italy ===
On the Italian side, there was the XXVI Corps, with the 19th Infantry Division "Venezia", 29th Infantry Division "Piemonte", and 49th Infantry Division "Parma" on the front, and the 53rd Infantry Division "Arezzo" as the reserve corps. Additional reinforcements in the form of the 2nd Alpine Division "Tridentina" and other Alpini elements began arriving from 13 November, but were committed piece-meal and had little impact.

== Plan ==
The Greek plan was to put the main effort on the left, along the mountainous road through the village Darza, rather through the Cangonj pass, as there were fears that the Italians could use armour through the relatively flat terrain of the Cangonj pass. The Greeks would attack with the 15th Division on the right (toward Cangonj), the 9th in the centre and the 10th on the left. The 15th had the task of approaching the Cangonj pass, between Ivan and Morava, and capturing if possible its western exit. The 9th would attack toward the Morava mountain, coordinating its left flank with the 10th Division. The 10th Division had the task of penetrating the Italian position, through the use of surprise, and if possible flank the Italian positions atop of Morava.

== Air Operations ==
On 14 November, aircraft of the 32nd and 33rd Bomber Squadrons attack the airports of Korçë and Gjirokastër, destroying many Italian planes (Greek loss was only one Bristol Blenheim with the killed Sminagos Charalambous Stamatios, Sminagos Papageorgiou Konstantinos and Dimitrios). Also Potez 25 planes of the 4th Military Cooperation Squadron carry out reconnaissance, bombing and shelling of enemy units. A plane is hit resulting in the death of the pilot, Lieutenant Commander Yaka Dimitriou. Finally, the Prosecution Squadrons make 42 exits in the area of Korçë. During the air battles, the Italians lost three Fiat CR.42, while four Greek PZLs suffered damage.

After four days, on 18 November, three Bristol Blenheim of the 32nd Bombing Squadron take off with the mission of bombing Gjirokastër. But because there is heavy cloud in the area, one of the planes drops its bombs on Përmet, where the Italians had stored significant quantities of ammunition, fuel and other supplies. For three days and nights the ammunition was being burned and blown up.

In 22 November, three Henschel Hs 126 aircraft locate an eight-kilometer-long enemy phalanx retreating from Korçë to Pogradec. A strong force of 15 Potez 630, Bristol Blenheim and Fairey Battle aircraft of the Bombing Squadrons rush for reinforcements, resulting in the complete destruction of the Italian phalanx. On the way back to the airport one of the Henschels encounters 15 Italian pursuers and is hit in the fuel tank. The Greek aircraft catches fire and the crew abandons it. The pilot, Subcommander Sideris Dimitrios, succumbed to his injuries, while the observer survived.

== International News ==
The New York Times said that the Greeks had administered the first real defeat which the land forces of the Axis powers had suffered, and that it will be the glory of Modern Greece, that they dissolved the undefeated. New York Herald Tribune also mentioned that the Greek army proved worthy of its ancestors. It succeeded in the first big defeat, which took place during this big war. The victory, after all, had a huge impact in the Near East. A telegram from a Times correspondent of London talked about disorders in Syria, and resolving concerns in Egypt who feared an Italian invasion (Italian invasion of Egypt) as well as thoughts of combining Greek victories in Epirus with new blows against the Italians in Libya. In an extensive article the Times of London described the new strategic situation that was consolidating in the Mediterranean after the Italian retreat. It is also noteworthy that even in movies being made in Hollywood at the time there were references about the Greek victory in Korçë.
