= Ubaldo Soddu =

Italian general

Army General Ubaldo Soddu
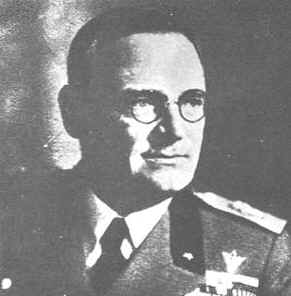
- Soddu in 1940
- Born: 23 July 1883; Salerno, Italy
- Died: 25 July 1949 (aged 66); Rome, Italy
- Military career
- Allegiance: Kingdom of Italy (1904–1944) (Italy) Italian Social Republic (1944–1945)
- Branch: Royal Italian Army
- Service years: 1904–1941
- Rank: Army general
- Commands: III Battalion, 52nd Infantry Regiment; 89th Infantry Regiment "Salerno"; Central Infantry School; 21st Infantry Division "Granatieri di Sardegna"; Albanian Army Corps Command; Higher Forces Command Albania (XXVI Army Corps)
- Conflicts: Italo-Turkish War; World War I; Italian front; Isonzo; Second Piave River; Vittorio Veneto; Western Front; World War II; Greco-Italian War; Battle of Morava–Ivan

National Councilor Ubaldo Soddu of the Chamber of Fasces and Corporations
- In office 1939 – 8 August 1943

Personal details
- Party: National Fascist Party
- Education: Royal Military Academy of Infantry and Cavalry, Modena
- Profession: Military officer

Ubaldo Soddu (23 July 1883, Salerno – 25 July 1949, Rome) was an Italian Fascist general and politician who held the position of Deputy Chief of Staff of the Army and Undersecretary of State for War during the initial phases of World War II. On 13 June 1940, immediately after the outbreak of hostilities with France and the United Kingdom, he assumed the position of deputy chief of the General Staff. Promoted to army general, he replaced general Sebastiano Visconti Prasca as commander of the Albanian Higher Troop Command during the Greco-Italian War on 8 November 1940. Because of the defeat Italian troops suffered between 22 and 23 November 1940, he was replaced after four weeks in command by the Italian Royal Army's chief of staff, General Ugo Cavallero.

== Biography ==
=== Early life ===
Soddu was born in Salerno on 23 July 1883. His father was a Sardinian military officer.

=== Military career ===
==== Early career ====
Soddu attended the Royal Military Academy of Infantry and Cavalry in Modena, graduating in 1904 and entering service with the Royal Army (Italian: Regio Esercito) with the rank of sottotenente ("sub-lieutenant"), assigned to the infantry arm. He took part in the Italo-Turkish War of 1911–1912.

==== World War I ====
Soddu subsequently served in World War I, in which Italy took part from May 1915 to November 1918, He fought on the Italian front from 1915 to 1918, seeing action in the Battles of the Isonzo and the Second Battle of the Piave River. He was promoted to tenente colonnello ("lieutenant colonel") on 8 November 1917, with seniority dating to 7 October 1917.

In 1918 Soddu went to fight on the Western Front in France, becoming commanding officer of the III Battalion, 52nd Infantry Regiment, a part of the Alpi Brigade in the 8th Division of the II Army Corps in July 1918. He distinguished himself on the Western Front, receiving two Silver Medals of Military Valour and a War Merit Cross from Italy and the Legion of Honour from France.

Soddu returned to Italy in time to fight in the Battle of Vittorio Veneto, the final major battle of the war on the Italian front.

==== Interwar period ====
Soddu was attached to the 21st Infantry Regiment until 16 October 1921, when he was attached to the Military College in Naples. On 24 October 1924 he began a new assignment at the Military Academy of Modena — receiving a promotion while there to colonnello ("colonel") on 5 December 1926 with seniority dating to 3 June 1926 — and on 1 October 1927 he became the academy's chief instructor. He later moved to the Army War School to teach the Operations Course for Senior Officers. From 20 November 1930 to 7 September 1933 he was commanding officer of the 89th Infantry Regiment "Salerno". On 7 September 1933 he took command of the Central Infantry School, holding that position until 17 December 1933. Subsequently "at the disposal of" the Ministry of War while awaiting orders, he became chief of staff of the Ministry of War on 4 January 1934. He was promoted to the rank of generale di brigata ("brigadier general") for exceptional merit on 12 March 1934.

On 1 April 1934, Soddu became acting commanding officer of the 21st Infantry Division "Granatieri di Sardegna". On 6 July 1936 Soddu received a promotion to the rank of generale di divisione ("divisional general") for exceptional merit, with seniority from 15 April 1936, and he became permanent commanding officer of the division that day. On 1 December 1937 he became Deputy Chief of Staff of the Army General Staff. In November 1938, Generale ("General") Alberto Pariani assigned him to examine an operational plan drawn up by Governor-General of Libya Italo Balbo for an invasion of Egypt in the event of a war with France and the United Kingdom. It envisaged concentrating available Italian forces in the east of Libya and remaining strictly on the defensive in western Libya on the Tunisian border. In an official report, Soddu stated that there was no alternative to an offensive toward Egypt "because a defensive attitude on the eastern frontier would favor the concentration of English troops." In an accompanying personal note, however, he added that a serious offensive plan could only be implemented with the "immediate" availability in Libya of sufficient forces to carry it out. He was elevated to the rank of generale di corpo d'armata ("army corps general") on 1 April 1939.

Italy initially remained neutral in World War II, which began with Nazi Germany′s invasion of Poland on 1 September 1939. On 31 October 1939 Soddu was appointed Undersecretary of State at the Ministry of War, and he assumed that position on 3 November 1939. On 31 March 1940 he received a secret memorandum written by Prime Minister Benito Mussolini in which Mussolini announced his intention to enter World War II alongside Nazi Germany against France and the United Kingdom; this highly confidential memorandum was delivered to King Victor Emmanuel III that same day and subsequently to the Minister of Foreign Affairs, Galeazzo Ciano; the Chief of the General Staff, Marshal of Italy Pietro Badoglio; the Chief of Staff of the Royal Army, Marshal of Italy Rodolfo Graziani; the Chief of Staff of the Regia Marina ("Royal Navy") Ammiraglio d'Armata ("Admiral of the Navy") Domenico Cavagnari; the Chief of Staff of the Regia Aeronautica ("Royal Air Force"), Generale di divisione aerea ("Divisional General of the Air") Francesco Pricolo; the Minister of Italian Africa Attilio Teruzzi; and the secretary of the National Fascist Party, Ettore Muti.

On 10 April 1940, Soddu was awarded the title of Commander of the Military Order of Savoy. In April 1940 he reorganized the Servizio Informazioni Militare ("Military Information Service"), arranging that the branch that dealt with counterespionage and anti-sabotage would form a new service, Controspionaggio Militare e Servizi Speciali (CSMSS, "Military Counter-Espionage and Special Services"). Placed under the command of Colonel Santo Emanuele, this service was intended for counter-espionage and "special services" tasks such as sabotage, special attacks, terrorism, and the physical elimination of adversaries.

==== World War II ====
Italy entered World War II on the side of the Axis powers on 10 June 1940 with its invasion of France during the Battle of France by the Italian Royal Army′s Army Group West. On 13 June 1940, Soddu assumed additional duties as deputy chief of the Supreme General Staff and commander of the Armata Territoriale ("Territorial Army"). He then joined Graziani in an inspection tour of the front in southern France. The Battle of France ended with the defeat of France and the Franco-Italian Armistice, which went into effect on 25 June 1940.

The Greco-Italian War began on 28 October 1940 when Italian forces in the Italian protectorate of Albania invaded Greece. On 8 November 1940, after a disappointing performance by Italian forces, Soddu replaced Generale designato ("General-designate") Sebastiano Visconti Prasca as commander of Higher Forces Command Albania (XXVI Army Corps). Simultaneously retaining his roles as Under-Secretary of State for War and Deputy Chief of the Supreme General Staff, he was promoted to the rank of generale designato d'armata ("army general-designate") either on 4 or 8 November 1940, according to different sources. Soddu had orders to stop the Italian retreat and stabilize the front, then resume the offensive as soon as possible.

Once he arrived in Albania, Soddu′s first order was to halt the floundering Italian offensive and take a defensive stance while awaiting the arrival of substantial reinforcements. He decided to launch a final offensive to resolve the war in Italy′s favor only at a later time, when more troops were available. During an inspection carried out on 17 November 1940, Pricolo met with Soddu and in his diary noted that he found Soddu — who had no previous experience of commanding anything larger than a battalion, let alone a field army, in wartime — insecure and fearful about the situation, writing that "he showed concern and intermittent confidence." Visconti Prasca, who took command of the 11th Army in Albania after Soddu′s arrival, criticized Soddu′s defensive provisions; after only a few days in command of the 11th Army, Visconti Pracsa was recalled to Italy and replaced by General Carlo Geloso on either 11 or 16 November 1940, according to different sources. For his part, Soddu, who as a hobby and part-time job composed musical scores for film soundtracks for the Italian film studio Cinecittà, often retreated for hours at a time to seek solace in composing music, leaving his subordinates leaderless as Italian forces suffered continued setbacks in Greece and Albania.

On 14 November 1940, the Greek Army under the command of General Alexander Papagos went on its first offensive of the war, beginning the Battle of Morava–Ivan. With a force of four divisions and one brigade, the Greeks attacked the northwestern sector of the Macedonian front, held by Italian troops stationed along the course of the river Devoll, concentrating in particular between the Morova massif and Mount Ivan, with the objective of seizing Korçë, Albania. With the arrival of two more Greek divisions in the combat zone, the situation on the front became unsustainable for the Italians and, fearing a Greek breakthrough, Soddu decided on a retreat of about 50 kilometres (31 mi), abandoning Korçë to the Greeks. The conquest of the city led to public demonstrations of jubilation in the streets in Greece and had major political and military repercussions in Italy. On 30 November 1940, the day he was promoted to generale d'armata ("army general"), Soddu was replaced in the roles of Deputy Chief of the General Staff and Undersecretary of State for War by General Alfredo Guzzoni. Geloso, commanding the 11th Army, proposed that the Epirus front, to avoid a possible encirclement, also retreat 60 kilometres (37 mi) to the north of Sarandë (Italian: Santi Quaranta) and Gjirokastër. Soddu did not accept Geloso′s recommendation, and between 1 and 2 December 1940 the Greeks broke through the Italian front in the Përmet sector, threatening to capture the vital Albanian port of Vlorë (Italian: Valona).

The disaster caused Soddu great emotional stress. In a telephone call with Guzzoni on 4 December 1940, Soddu even suggested that Mussolini resolve the conflict diplomatically with a proposal for an armistice. Mussolini could have viewed the call as treasonous and grounds for ordering Soddu's execution, but Mussolini's lingering regard for Soddu led him instead to send General Ugo Cavallero — who, after Badoglio 's resignation on 28 November 1940, officially became Chief of the General Staff on 4 December 1940 — to Albania to help Soddu and evaluate his performance. Soddu and General Mario Vercellino, the commander of the Italian 9th Army, greeted Cavallero when he arrived at Vercellino's headquarters in Elbasan, Albania, on the afternoon of 4 December 1940, and from then on Soddu served only nominally as commander while Cavallero directed the conduct of war operations through him. Cavallero finally officially replaced Soddu in command of the troops on either 30 December 1940 or 13 January 1941, according to different sources. Soddu′s removal from command stemmed in part from his practice of dabbling in composing film soundtracks even in wartime, which Mussolini found inappropriate.

Soddu was recalled to Italy, where he was attached to the Ministry of War. He retired from the army on 1 May 1941.

=== Political career ===
As a member of the National Fascist Party, Soddu became a member, or "national councilor," of the Chamber of Fasces and Corporations in 1939 during the XXX Legislature of Italy, and he remained a member of the chamber during World War II. Mussolini′s fascist regime ended on 25 July 1943, and 8 August 1943 Soddu left parliament and retired to private life, although he served as a special observer of the First Badoglio government, which succeeded Mussolini's regime.

The Kingdom of Italy surrendered to the Allies on 9 September 1943 and switched to the Allied side. Germany immediately forcibly occupied the portions of Italy not yet under Allied control and established a puppet state in northern Italy, the Italian Social Republic under Mussolini, which continued the war on the Axis side, resulting in the Italian Civil War between forces loyal to the Kingdom of Italy and those loyal to the Italian Social Republic. Soddu was arrested and imprisoned briefly at Forte Boccea in Rome, but after the Germans took control of Rome the German commander-in-chief in Italy, Generalfeldmarschall ("Field Marshal") Albert Kesselring, ordered his release on 12 September 1943. In March 1944, Soddu swore allegiance to the Italian Social Republic, revealing his continued sympathy for the Italian fascist regime and its alliance with the Axis powers. The Italian fascists disliked him, however, and as a result he saw no active service with the Italian Social Republic. The Fascist politician Giovanni Preziosi attacked Soddu harshly between December 1944 and March 1945 in the journal La vita italiana, accusing him of being a Freemason and of having purposely sabotaged the military campaign in Greece in 1940–1941. Soddu protested to Mussolini, who played down Preziosi′s allegations, saying that it was not the time for investigations.

World War II in Europe and the Italian Civil War ended in May 1945 with the surrender of Germany to the Western Allies on 8 May 1945 and to the Soviet Union on 9 May and the dissolution of the Italian Social Republic. After the war Soddu faced no particular disciplinary consequences for his support of the Italian Social Republic, in part because he by then had been on the sidelines of Italian politics for years.

=== Later life ===
Soddu did not write any memoirs of the 1940–1941 Greek campaign except for an unpublished typescript entitled Memorie e riflessioni di un generale ("Memoirs and Reflections of a General"), dated "Desenzano del Garda, Winter 1948."

Soddu died in Rome on 25 July 1949.

== Personal life ==
A Freemason, Soddu was initiated in 1912 into the "Nicola Fabrizi - Secura Fides" Lodge of Modena. In addition to his hobby of composing music for films, he developed a reputation during his career for having a fondness for fine food and wine. He once described his military career by saying, "...when you have a fine plate of pasta guaranteed for life, and a little music, you don't need anything more."

== Publications ==
- Perché Bonaparte nel 1797 inizia una nuova campagna contro l'Austria ("Why Bonaparte Began a New Campaign Against Austria in 1797"), 1914 (in Italian)
- Statuti libici personali e reali ("Personal and Royal Statutes of Libya"), Tip. degli Stab. militari di pena, 1924 (in Italian)
- Movimento e guerra celermente risolutiva ("Movement and War Quickly Resolved"), 1937 (in Italian)

== Honors and awards ==
=== Italian ===
- Commander of the Military Order of Savoy (Royal Decree of 10 April 1940)
- Silver Medal of Military Valor (first award)

"Having assumed command of a regiment in critical conditions, with energy and personal valor he kept his units alongside French ones in stubborn resistance for several days. Wounded, he continued to command them, giving a fine example of courage and contempt for danger, earning himself a summons to the order of the French Army. S. Imoges (Champagne), 16–23 July 1918."

- Silver Medal of Military Valor (second award)

"In two subsequent front line actions, hit both times by asphyxiating gas, he remained fearless at his command post; with a high spirit of sacrifice he refused to be treated, remaining in his place. And he managed to keep his battalion in position, where those affected by the gas were in considerable numbers. Canal lateral de l'Aisne-Sissonne, 27 September–27 October 1918."

- War Merit Cross
- Commemorative Medal for the Italo-Turkish War 1911–1912
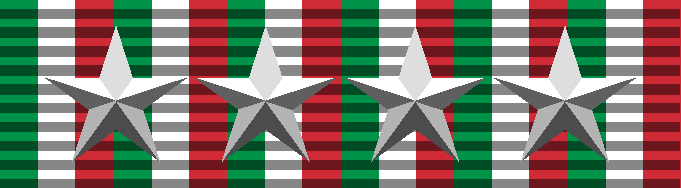
- Commemorative Medal for the Italo-Austrian War 1915–1918 (four years of campaign)
- Commemorative Medal of the Unity of Italy
- Allied Victory Medal
- Commemorative Medal of the Expedition to Albania
- Knight of the Order of Saints Maurice and Lazarus
- Officer of the Order of Saints Maurice and Lazarus
- Commander of the Order of Saints Maurice and Lazarus (26 March 1936)
- Knight of the Order of the Crown of Italy
- Officer of the Order of the Crown of Italy (Royal Decree 18 April 1931)
- Commander of the Order of the Crown of Italy
- Grand Officer of the Order of the Crown of Italy
- Knight Grand Cross of the Order of the Crown of Italy (Royal Decree, 31 March 1937)
- Knight of the Colonial Order of the Star of Italy (Royal Decree 28 December 1933)
- Officer of the Colonial Order of the Star of Italy
- Commander of the Colonial Order of the Star of Italy (Royal Decree 19 December 1934)
- Grand Officer of the Colonial Order of the Star of Italy (Royal Decree 27 December 1934)

=== Foreign ===
- Knight of the Order of the Legion of Honour (France)
