= 15th Infantry Division (Greece) =

15th Infantry Division XV Μεραρχία Πεζικού (XV ΜΠ)
- Active: 1915–1916, 1940–1941, 1945–1998
- Country: Greece
- Branch: Hellenic Army
- Type: Infantry
- Size: Division
- Part of: V Army Corps (1915–1916), III Army Corps (1940); II Army Corps (1941, 1945–1962); I Army Corps (1962–1998)
- Garrison/HQ: Kastoria, Western Macedonia
- Motto(s): This Number Is Sufficient; ΚΑΙ ΟΥΤΟΣ Ο ΑΡΙΘΜΟΣ ΙΚΑΝΟΣ
- Engagements: Greco-Italian War: Battle of Morava-Ivan; Battle of Trebeshina; Capture of Klisura Pass; Greek Civil War

The 15th Infantry Division (Greek: XV Μεραρχία Πεζικού (XV ΜΠ), romanized: XV Merarchía Pezikoú) was an infantry division of the Hellenic Army. Established for the first time briefly in 1915–1916, it was re-established in 1940, during the Greco-Italian War. The division distinguished itself in the war, where it took part in some of the most significant battles of the conflict. It was disbanded after the Battle of Greece, re-established after liberation in 1945 and subsequently fought in the Greek Civil War. It remained active in the Kastoria, Grevena and Florina areas until 1998, when it was reorganized and renamed as the 15th Infantry Brigade.

== History ==
=== World War I ===
The 15th Infantry Division was formed for the first time in 1915, following the Greek mobilization on 10 September 1915, in response to the mobilization of Bulgaria. The new formation was headquartered at Thessaloniki, while its units were recruited and formed in the Aegean islands: the 43rd Infantry Regiment at Lesbos, the 44th Infantry Regiment at Chios, and the 45th Infantry Regiment at Samos. These units were shipped to the wider Thessaloniki area by the end of September, and the full division became part of the V Army Corps in October. The division was disbanded following the demobilization of the Greek Army in May 1916.

=== Greco-Italian War ===
The 15th Infantry Division was reformed on 6 November 1940 when the 4th Infantry Brigade was expanded and augmented by personnel conscripted from the Kastoria and Grevena regions, following the outbreak of the Greco-Italian War. Both the brigade and the newly formed division were commanded by Colonel Agamemnon Metaxas.

The newly formed division, now composed of three Infantry Regiments (28th, 33rd, and 90th) with artillery support (XV Mountain Artillery Regiment), was attached to the III Army Corps – which was, in turn, under the operational command of the Western Macedonia Army Section – and tasked with the defence of the northern flank of the Albanian front. On 14 November 1940, the 15th Infantry Division engaged and captured Italian positions on Hill 1480, also known as "Ivan's Rampart", as part of the Battle of Morava–Ivan. The capture of the hill gave the 15th Infantry Division a strategic position overlooking the pass at the Devoll river crossing near the village of Cangonj. During the second phase of the battle (17–20 November 1940), the division secured the crossing. This success allowed Greek forces in the south to concentrate on the expulsion of Italian forces on the Morava heights, and eventually capture the town of Korytsa on 22 November 1940.

On 7 December 1940, the 15th Infantry Division moved on towards Pogradec and relieved a reconnaissance force from the 13th Infantry Division, which had secured the village on 30 November 1940. As part of a major push to secure Greek positions (13 December 1940 – 6 January 1941), the division was subsequently placed under the command of the II Army Corps and moved to the Përmet District, north of Këlcyrë, where it encountered the Italian 7th Infantry Division. On 8 January 1941 Italian forces, who had control of many of the surrounding peaks, attacked units of the 15th Infantry Division that had taken-up positions around Taronine.

The 90th Infantry Regiment engaged Italian forces on Mali i Taronit (also known as Mali Taronine) on 10 January 1941, near the Këlcyrë-Tepelenë road. The success of the attack was strategically significant because it secured the northern flank of the Greek forces engaged in the Capture of Klisura Pass. Under the command of Colonel Christos Gerakinis, the regiment captured the hill with a bayonet charge, suffering 42 killed (including Major Dimitrios Kyriazis, one of its senior officers) and 161 wounded. Between 12 January 1941 and 17 January 1941, the 15th Infantry Division's attacks on positions of the Italian 7th Infantry Division inflicted such heavy casualties that it forced an Italian retreat. Significantly, the 90th Regiment's repeated attacks during heavy winter storms on the Dras-e-Kais hill, the village of Kaitsa, and Mali Nisitse, saw the capture of most of the Italian 77th Regiment, including its commander Colonel Menigetti and his command staff. On 2 February 1941, elements of the 15th Infantry Division under now-Major General Agamemnon Metaxas captured Height 802 and the nearby town of Bubës, northwest of Klisura.

During the Battle of Trebeshina, on 13 February 1941, the division supported the 5th Cretan Division during its capture of the 1,805-metre (5,921-ft) northern peak of Mal Shëndëlli, before advancing their line a further 5 km (3 miles). Subsequent engagements saw the two divisions take heights 1647, 1260, and 1178. The 15th Infantry Division lost 2,000 killed, wounded or missing during the battle. Their advance was eventually stopped by strong Italian resistance at Tepelenë. By the end of the Greco-Italian War, the division had lost 1,363 soldiers killed, and nearly three times that number wounded or missing.

The 15th Infantry Division was disbanded with the Greek capitulation following the German invasion of Greece in April 1941.

=== Greek Civil War ===
The 15th Infantry Division was re-established on 15 May 1945, and participated in the Greek Civil War as part of the Royal Hellenic Army's II Army Corps. On 14 June 1948, the division took part in the failed Operation "Crown" (Greek: Eπιχείρηση «Κορωνίς», romanized: Epiheírisi "Koronís"), a major offensive against Communist forces entrenched in the Grammos mountains. After 40 days of close fighting, the numerically outnumbered DSE forces managed to punch through the II Army Corps' lines and flee towards Vitsi.

On 29 January 1949, the 15th Infantry Division, along with the A and B Raider Squadrons and the 39th Infantry Regiment, successfully recaptured the town of Karpenisi after bitter fighting against two DSE divisions, which suffered heavy losses. From 10 August 1949 to 30 August 1949, the division was involved in the second and third phases of Operation "Torch" (Greek: Eπιχείρηση «Πυρσός», romanized: Epiheírisi "Pyrsós"), the campaign to dislodge DSE forces from the Grammos-Vitsi mountains. These operations resulted in the defeat of DSE forces and the end of the Civil War.

=== Cold War and after ===
From 1962, the division was placed under the command of the I Army Corps, and with its headquarters in Kastoria, the 15th Infantry Division – consisting of five Infantry Battalions, one Armoured Squadron and one Artillery Squadron – was tasked with the defence of the prefectures of Grevena, Florina and Kastoria, manning 24 border outposts from Lake Prespa to Grammos. By 1989, the division consisted of the following units.

- 51st Infantry Regiment, based at Grevena
- 53rd Infantry Regiment, based at Kostarazi
- 90th Infantry Regiment, based at Argos Orestiko
- XV Field Artillery Squadron, based at Argos Orestiko

The division was reduced to a brigade-level formation on 31 March 1998 and renamed as the 15th Infantry Brigade.

== Emblem and motto ==
The emblem of the 15th Infantry Division is a labrys-wielding griffin (Greek: γρύψ, romanized: grýps), symbolizing strength (lion's body), speed (eagle's wings) and vigilant guard (labrys ready to strike).

The division's motto was This Number Is Sufficient (Greek: Και Ούτος Ο Αριθμός Ικανός, romanized: Ké Oútos o Arithmós Ikanós). The phrase was attributed to Leonidas when he was in charge of guarding the narrow mountain pass at Thermopylae with just 7,000 Greek men in order to delay the invading Persian army. He was asked why he had come to fight such a huge host with so few men. Leonidas answered, “If numbers are what matters, all Greece cannot match a small part of that army; but if courage is what counts, this number is sufficient.” (Greek: «τω πλήθει, ουδέ η πάσα Ελλάς αρκεί· βραχεία γαρ μοίρα του εκείνων πλήθους εστίν· ει δε ταις αρεταίς, και ούτος ο αριθμός ικανός»).
