= 4th Infantry Brigade (Greece) =

4th Infantry Brigade IV Ταξιαρχία Πεζικού
- Flag and Emblem of the 4th Infantry Brigade, 1998–2013
- Active: 1897–1912, 1939–1940, 1998–2013
- Country: Greece
- Branch: Hellenic Army
- Type: Infantry
- Size: Brigade
- Part of: 2nd Division (1897-1912); III Army Corps (1939-1940), (1998-2013)

The 4th Infantry Brigade (Greek: IV Ταξιαρχία Πεζικού, IV Taxiarchia Pezikou) was an infantry brigade of the Hellenic Army. Originally formed in 1897, it served until 1912. Re-formed in the lead-up to the Greco-Italian War in 1940, it was expanded and renamed as the 15th Infantry Division after the war started. It was again reactivated in 1998, and served until 2013.

== 1897–1912 ==
The 4th Infantry Brigade (Δ′ Ταξιαρχία Πεζικού) was first established on 24 October 1897, as part of 2nd Infantry Division, comprising the 8th and 9th Infantry Regiments. The divisional commands were abolished in August 1900, to be reconstituted in a major reorganization on 8 September. 4th Brigade, based at Chalkis, remained under 2nd Division (based at Athens), but no comprised the 2nd and 5th Infantry Regiments, the 2nd Cavalry Regiment, the 2nd Artillery Regiment, and the 2nd Evzone Battalion. In the 1904 reorganization, the brigade was moved to Nafplio, and comprised the 8th and 11th Infantry Regiments, again as part of the 2nd Division at Athens. The brigade was abolished in 1912, with the establishment of triangular divisions.

== 1940 Reformation and Expansion ==
The 4th Infantry Brigade was re-formed during the pre-mobilization period before the outbreak of the Greco-Italian War in 1940. It was raised under the III Army Corps, which along with the II Army Corps comprised the Western Macedonia Army Section. On 28 October 1940, from its base in Florina, the brigade was deployed to the Albanian border to counter a possible Italian incursion into Western Macedonia. While Italian activity in the area was limited to artillery bombardment and raids on Greek outposts, the Greek Army General Headquarters (GHQ) ordered its forces to conduct aggressive attacks in the vicinity of the Devoll river valley.

On 1 November 1940, the bulk of the 4th Infantry Brigade (under the command of Colonel Agamemnon Metaxas) attacked and captured Italian positions of the 29th Infantry Division Piemonte on the western peninsula of Lake Prespa, while another element of the brigade secured the villages of Vërnik and the nearby hill of Lizitsina. An attack further south also secured the villages of Kapshticë and Bilisht for the Greeks.

On 5 November 1940 the order was given to prepare for a major offensive against Italian forces entrenched along the Morava-Ivan heights, a natural defensive line protecting the town of Korytsa, where the XXVI Italian Corps under Gabriele Nasci was based. The next day, 6 November 1940, the 4th Infantry Brigade was reinforced by personnel conscripted from the Kastoria and Grevena regions of Western Macedonia and renamed as the 15th Infantry Division.

== 1998–-2013 ==
On 1 January 1998, a wide-ranging reorganization of the Army took place, and III Army Corps assumed the zone of II Corps as well, now comprising 6th Infantry Division (Kilkis), 10th Infantry Division (Serres), 11th Infantry Division (Kavala), 4th Infantry Brigade at Axioupolis, 3rd Support Brigade (Thessaloniki) and the 5/42 Evzone Regiment (Skydra).
