= Ioannis Pitsikas =

Greek Army lieutenant general (1881–1975)

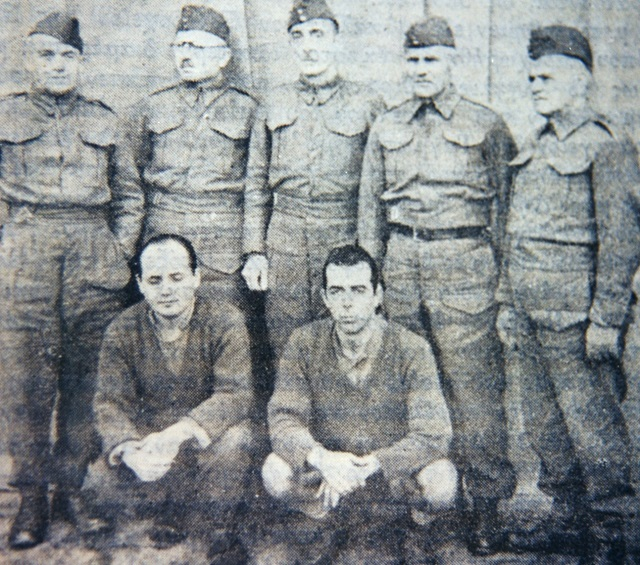

Ioannis Pitsikas (Greek: Ιωάννης Πιτσίκας, 1881–1975) was a Greek Army lieutenant general active in World War II, who served as Mayor of Athens and twice in cabinet posts in interim governments post-war.

== Biography ==
Pitsikas was born in 1881 in the village of Kallithea in Spercheiada. He became a career officer in the Greek Army after studies in the Hellenic Army Academy, and fought in the Balkan Wars and the Asia Minor Campaign. Trained as a staff officer in the 1920s, he served as CO of the 6th Infantry Division until 1935, and then, promoted to Lieutenant General, as CO of I Army Corps until 1940. With the outbreak of the Greco-Italian War, he assumed command of the Western Macedonia Army Section (Τμήμα Στρατιάς Δυτικής Μακεδονίας) on the Albanian front and later of the Epirus Army Section (Τμήμα Στρατιάς Ηπείρου), which he led until the Greek Army's capitulation during the German invasion of Greece. In July 1943 he was arrested by the German occupation authorities along with a number of other senior generals, led by Alexander Papagos, for their contacts with the Allies in the Middle East, and transported to Dachau concentration camp in Germany.

Released from captivity after the war's end, he retired with the rank of lieutenant general. He was installed by the conservative governments as Mayor of Athens after his predecessor Aristeidis Skliros was dismissed, serving in the post in 1946–1950. He also served as Minister of National Defence in Dimitrios Kiousopoulos' caretaker government in 1952, and as Minister for Northern Greece in the caretaker cabinet of Konstantinos Dovas in 1961. He was awarded the Grand Cross of the Order of George I. He died on 6 July 1975 and was buried in the First Cemetery of Athens.

== Sources ==
- Βιογραφική Εγκυκλοπαίδεια του Νεωτέρου Ελληνισμού 1830-2010, Vol. 3, pp. 196–197, Metron Publications

Preceded by Aristeidis Skliros	Mayor of Athens; 18 May 1946 – 17 August 1950	Succeeded by Antonios Ragousis
Preceded by Georgios Mavros	Minister for National Defence of Greece; 11 October – 23 November 1952	Succeeded by Alexander Papagos
Preceded by Avgoustos Theologitis	Minister for Northern Greece; 24 September – 4 November 1961	Succeeded by Dionysios Manentis
