= V Army Corps (Greece) =

- Active: 1913–1916, 1926–1927, 1935–1941
- Country: Greece
- Garrison/HQ: Ioannina, Alexandroupoli, Bobostitsa (near Korçë)

The V Army Corps (Greek: Ε' Σώμα Στρατού, abbr. Ε' ΣΣ), sometimes found as Army Corps E, was an army corps of the Hellenic Army, active in the struggles in Northern Epirus in 1913–1914 and in the Greco-Italian War.

== History ==
Along with the other Corps formations of the Hellenic Army, V Army Corps was formed in December 1913, following the Balkan Wars. It was headquartered in Ioannina and comprised the 8th (Ioannina) and 9th (Preveza) infantry divisions, covering the Greco-Albanian border in Epirus. At the time of its establishment, the Corps's zone also included Northern Epirus, which had come under Greek control during the First Balkan War. The Corps withdrew its units from there in February 1914, which led to an uprising of the local Greek population. In October 1914, following the outbreak of World War I, the region was reoccupied with the assent of the Entente powers. Following the Greek mobilization in September 1915, V Corps expanded to include the 8th, 9th, 15th, and 16th Infantry Divisions. The corps was demobilized and disbanded as a result of the National Schism and the Greek demobilization in late 1916.

It was re-established with the July 1926 Army reorganization, but disbanded again a year later. It was re-established again in 1935, this time based in Alexandroupoli, covering Western Thrace with the 12th Infantry Division at Komotini, and the islands of the eastern Aegean with the 13th Infantry Division. However, with the outbreak of the Greco-Italian War on 28 October 1940, all available forces were switched to Epirus, and on 15 December 1940, V Corps was disbanded and its name transferred to the "K" Group of Divisions on the Albanian front. The latter was a corps-sized battle group, formed on 11 November to facilitate the Greek counter-attack against the Italians. It came under the operational control of Western Macedonia Army Section (TSDM) and was named after its commander, Lt. Gen. Georgios Kosmas. On 10 March 1941, when Kosmas was transferred to command of I Army Corps, V Army Corps was finally disbanded and its component units directly subordinated to TSDM.

== Sources ==
- Επίτομη ιστορία της συμμετοχής του Ελληνικού Στρατού στον Πρώτο Παγκόσμιο Πόλεμο 1914 - 1918 [Concise History of the Hellenic Army's Participation in the First World War 1914–1918] (in Greek). Athens: Hellenic Army History Directorate. 1993.
- Η ιστορία της οργάνωσης του Ελληνικού Στρατού, 1821–1954 [The history of the organization of the Hellenic Army, 1821–1954] (in Greek). Hellenic Army History Directorate. 2005. ISBN 960-7897-45-5.
