= Demestichas =

Demestichas is a surname. Notable people with the surname include:

- Ioannis Demestichas
- Panagiotis Demestichas
