= Panagiotis Demestichas =

Panagiotis Demestichas (Greek: Παναγιώτης Δεμέστιχας, 6 July 1885 (O.S.) – 14 November 1960) was an officer of the Greek Army who rose to the rank of lieutenant general, leading an army corps in the Greco-Italian War. He also briefly served as Minister of the Interior in the first collaborationist government under General Georgios Tsolakoglou during the Axis occupation of Greece.

== Life ==
Panagiotis Demestichas was born on 6 July 1885 (O.S.), in the village of Kotrona near Gytheio, to Petros Demestichas and his wife Venetia. After completing high school at Gytheio in 1904, he entered the faculty of Law of the University of Athens, but left it in 1905 to join the Greek Army as a volunteer, with the rank of corporal.

He later entered the NCO School, from which he graduated on 7 July 1912 (O.S.) as an Infantry 2nd Lieutenant. He participated in the Balkan Wars of 1912–13, rising to company commander by the end of the First Balkan War, a position he held throughout the Second Balkan War as well. After Greece's entry in World War I, he fought in the Macedonian front as a staff officer of 13th Infantry Division, being promoted to major in 1918. In 1919 he participated with the 13th Division in the Allied intervention in the Russian Civil War, and then went on to fight in the Asia Minor Campaign, where he was transferred to the 5th Infantry Division. In 1922, after the Greek retreat from Asia Minor, he became a staff officer in the General Headquarters. He was promoted to colonel in 1925, received his degree in law in 1928, and became a major general in 1934. In 1934–39 he served as Deputy Chief of the Hellenic Army General Staff and commanding officer of the 2nd, 4th and 9th Infantry Divisions, as well as a stint as Head of the King's Military Household.

In August 1940 he was promoted to lieutenant general and left the 9th Division to take command of I Army Corps. Following the outbreak of the Greco-Italian War on 28 October, he led the corps in battle until 11 December, when he was transferred to command V Army Corps until 6 March 1941, when he returned to I Corps. With the German invasion of Greece a month later and the capitulation of the Greek Army, he became a member of the first collaborationist government under Lieutenant General Georgios Tsolakoglou, serving as Minister of the Interior until 20 September 1941.

Following the liberation of the country in 1944, he was tried by a court-martial, and dismissed from the Army in 1946.

He died on 14 November 1960. He married and had three children.
