= Western Macedonia Army Section =

Field army of the Hellenic Army during the Greco-Italian War

The Western Macedonia Army Section (Greek: Τμήμα Στρατιάς Δυτικής Μακεδονίας, ΤΣΔΜ; Tmima Stratias Dytikis Makedonias, TSDM) was a field army of the Hellenic Army active during the Greco-Italian War (1940–41).

== History ==
The command was established in western Macedonia prior to the Italian attack on 28 October 1940. Based at Kozani, it was commanded by Lieutenant-General Ioannis Pitsikas and comprised the II Army Corps (Lieutenant-General Dimitrios Papadopoulos) and III Army Corps (Lieutenant-General Georgios Tsolakoglou), each of two infantry divisions and an infantry brigade. The total forces available to TSDM on the outbreak of war consisted of 22 infantry battalions and 22 artillery batteries (seven heavy).

Following the Italian attack, TSDM played a crucial role in reversing the initial Italian penetration in the Battle of Pindus, where the weak Pindus Detachment was retreating against the elite Italian Julia Alpine Division. TSDM assigned the Pindus sector to the 1st Infantry Division, and progressively assigned more forces as they arrived—the Cavalry Division, 5th Brigade, and the newly formed Cavalry Brigade—managing to stabilize the situation by 30 October, and on 3 November began a counter-attack that forced the Julia to withdraw back to Albania to prevent being encircled. In the meantime, III Corps had undertaken limited advances into Albanian territory, and already on 6 November, it submitted plans for a general offensive. Judged too ambitious for the moment, the Greek commander-in-chief Alexandros Papagos postponed the offensive for 14 November.

By 14 November, with the Greek mobilization almost complete, TSDM's II Corps, deployed in the Pindus sector, comprised 1st Infantry Division, 5th Infantry Brigade and the Cavalry Brigade), and III Corps in western Macedonia proper comprised 9th, 10th, 15th Infantry Divisions, with 11th Division assembling in its rear. III Corps' main objective was the capture of the Korçë plateau, which controlled access to the interior of Albania along the valley of the Devoll river. The plateau lay behind the Morava and Ivan mountains on the Greco-Albanian frontier, which were held by the 29th Piemonte, the 19th Venezia, and the 49th Parma divisions. The Italians were later reinforced by the 2nd Alpine Division Tridentina, the 53rd Arezzo Division, and 30–50 tanks of the Centauro Division. Leaving five battalions to secure its rear, III Corps attacked with twenty battalions and 37 artillery batteries. Due to the lack of tanks or anti-tank weapons to counter Italian armour, the Greeks decided to limit their movement along the mountain ridges, never descending to the valleys. The offensive was launched on the morning of 14 November, with the corps' three divisions moving on converging lines of attack towards Korçë. To achieve surprise, the attack was not preceded by an artillery barrage.

The Italian forces were indeed taken by surprise, allowing the Greeks to force several breaches in the Italian positions on 14–16 November. On 17 November, III Corps was reinforced with 13th Infantry Division, and on the next day, with 11th Division, which along with the 10th Division formed a new command, the "K" Group of Divisions or OMK (Lieutenant-General Georgios Kosmas). The most critical moment for the Greeks came on 18 November, when elements of the 13th Division panicked during an ill-coordinated attack and the division almost retreated; its commander was sacked on the spot and the new commander, Major-General Sotirios Moutousis, forbade any further retreat, restoring the front. On 19–21 November, the Greeks captured the summit of Morava. Fearing that they would be surrounded and cut off, the Italians retreated towards the Devoll valley during the night, and on 22 November the city of Korçë was captured by 9th Division. By 27 November, TSDM had captured the entire Korçë plateau, suffering 624 dead and 2,348 wounded. Further south and west, I Corps and II Corps had moved to evict the Italians from Greek territory, which they achieved by 23 November. II Corps further moved across the border line, capturing Ersekë on 21 November and Leskovik on the next day.

Following the capture of Korçë and the eviction of the Italian forces from Greek soil, the Greek GHQ faced two options: continue the offensive in the Korçë sector in the direction of Elbasan or shift focus on the left flank and drive towards the port of Valona. In the event, the latter option was chosen. TSDM, comprising III Corps and the newly formed "K" Group of Divisions (OMK), would defend their positions on the Greek right and apply pressure on the Italians in front of them, while the reinforced I Corps would move north along the Gjirokastër–Tepelenë–Valona axis. II Corps would form the pivot of the movement, securing the connection between I Corps and TSDM, as well as advancing in step with its western neighbour in the direction of Berat. Despite its role being limited to pinning down the Italian front in its sector, TSDM's 10th Division captured Moscopole on 24 November, and Pogradec, evacuated by the Italians, was captured by 13th Division on 30 November. OMK under Lieutenant-General Kosmas (now essentially reduced to the 10th Division) captured the Ostravicë Mountain on 12 December, while III Corps—since 1 December reinforced with 17th Division, which replaced 13th Division—completed its occupation of the Kamia massif and secured possession of Pogradec. On 2 December, Papagos, accompanied by Crown Prince Paul, visited the front. Generals Pitsikas and Tsolakoglou urged him to order an immediate attack on the strategic Klisura Pass, without waiting for I and II Corps to level with TSDM. Papagos angrily rejected the proposal, and issued orders to continue the prescribed plan, with III Corps relegated to a passive role. This decision was later heavily criticized; coupled with the onset of winter, it effectively froze the Greek right wing in place. Despite the atrocious weather and the heavy snowfall, the Greek offensive continued on the left (I and II Corps) throughout December. OMK, now renamed as the V Army Corps, but still comprising only the 10th Division), managed to advance up to Mount Tomorr and secure the connection between II and III Corps, which remained in its positions.

After the Capture of Klisura Pass in mid-January, the Greek advance stalled. Despite the Greek successes in Albania thus far, in February 1941 dissension within the Greek leadership emerged over strategy towards the expected German attack and the need for a withdrawal in Albania. The front commanders in Albania represented their views to GHQ in Athens and in early March, Papagos moved to replace virtually the entire leadership in the Albanian front. As a result, Pitsikas was moved from TSDM to command the Epirus Army Section (comprising I and II Corps), leaving TSDM to II Corps Commander Tsolakoglou.

Following the start of the German invasion of Greece on 6 April, Papagos ordered TSDM to launch an attack towards Elbasan, in conjunction with Yugolav forces. The attack began on 7 April and the 13th Division made some progress but the Yugoslav army, also attacked by the Germans, rapidly collapsed and the operation was cancelled. On 12 April, GHQ in Athens ordered the Greek forces on the Albanian front to retreat but the decision was too late. The Greek commanders knew that Italian pressure, the lack of motor transport and pack animals, the physical exhaustion of the Greek army and the poor transport network of Epirus, any retreat was likely to end up in disintegration. Advice to retreat before the start of the German attack had been rejected and they petitioned Pitsikas to surrender. Pitsikas forbade such talk but notified Papagos and urged a solution that would secure "the salvation and honour of our victorious Army". The order to retreat, the disheartening news of the Yugoslav collapse and the rapid German advance in Macedonia, led to a breakdown of morale in the Greek troops, many of whom had been fighting without rest for five months and were forced to abandon hard-won ground. By 15 April, the divisions of II Army Corps began to disintegrate, with men and even entire units abandoning their positions.

On 16 April, Pitsikas reported to Papagos that signs of disintegration had also begun to appear among the divisions of I Corps and begged him to "save the army from the Italians". On the next day, TSDM was renamed to III Army Corps and placed under Pitsikas' command. At this juncture, the three corps commanders, along with the metropolitan bishop of Ioannina, Spyridon, pressured Pitsikas to unilaterally negotiate with the Germans. When he refused, the others decided to bypass him and selected Tsolakoglou, as the senior of the three generals, to carry out the task. On 20 April, Tsolakoglou contacted SS-Obergruppenführer Sepp Dietrich, the commander of the nearest German unit, the Leibstandarte SS Adolf Hitler (LSSAH) brigade, to offer surrender. The protocol of surrender was signed at 18:00 of the same day between Tsolakoglou and Dietrich. Presented with the fait accompli, Pitsikas was informed an hour later and resigned his command.

== Sources ==
- Gedeon, Dimitrios (2001). "Ο Ελληνοϊταλικός Πόλεμος 1940–41: Οι χερσαίες επιχειρήσεις". Ο Ελληνικός Στρατός και το Έπος της Βορείου Ηπείρου. Periskopio. pp. 4–35. ISBN 960-86822-5-8.
- Koliopoulos, Ioannis (1978). "Ο Πόλεμος του 1940/1941". In Christopoulos, Georgios A. & Bastias, Ioannis K. (eds.). Ιστορία του Ελληνικού Έθνους [History of the Greek Nation] (in Greek). Vol. ΙΕ: Νεώτερος Ελληνισμός από το 1913 έως το 1941 [Modern Hellenism from 1913 to 1941]. Athens: Ekdotiki Athinon. pp. 411–453. ISBN 978-960-213-111-4.
- Stockings, Craig; Hancock, Eleanor (2013). Swastika over the Acropolis: Re-interpreting the Nazi Invasion of Greece in World War II. BRILL. ISBN 9789004254596.
