= Prasca =

Prasca may refer to:

- Prașca River, a tributary of the Moldova (river)
- Sebastiano Visconti Prasca (1883–1961), Italian general
