= 4th Infantry Brigade =

4th Infantry Brigade may refer to:

== United Kingdom ==
- 4th Infantry Brigade (United Kingdom), a unit of the British 2nd Infantry Division in World War II
- 4th London Infantry Brigade

== Others ==
- 4th Brigade (Australia), an Australian Army Reserve formation stationed in Victoria
- 4th Light Horse Brigade, an Australian mounted infantry formation in World War I
- 4th Infantry Brigade (Canada), a unit of the 2nd Canadian Division in World War I
- 4th Infantry Brigade (Greece)
- 4th Indian Infantry Brigade
- 4th Infantry Brigade (New Zealand), a unit of the New Zealand Division in World War I
- 4th Infantry Brigade (South Africa)

== See also ==
- 4th Brigade (disambiguation)
- 4th Infantry Regiment (disambiguation)
- 4th Infantry Division (disambiguation)
