= 17th Infantry Division (Greece) =

17th Infantry Division XVII Μεραρχία Πεζικού (XVII ΜΠ)
- Active: 1940–1941
- Country: Kingdom of Greece
- Branch: Hellenic Army
- Type: Infantry
- Size: Division
- Engagements: Greco-Italian War

The 17th Infantry Division (Greek: XVII Μεραρχία Πεζικού, XVII ΜΠ; XVII Merarchia Pezikou, XVII MP) was an infantry division of the Hellenic Army that fought in the Greco-Italian War.

Pre-war plans for defence against a joint Italian–Bulgarian attack (Plan "IB") envisaged the raising of the 17th Division during mobilization, and its employment against Bulgaria under the Kavala Army Section, in eastern Macedonia.

When Italy invaded Greece in October 1940, the division was mobilized, but as Bulgaria remained neutral, it was transferred to the Albanian front and fought against the Italian army as part of III Army Corps under the Western Macedonia Army Section. Following the German invasion of Greece and the capitulation of the Greek army in Albania, the division was disbanded.

== Sources ==
- Hellenic Army History Directorate (1997). An Abridged History of the Greek-Italian and Greek-German War, 1940-1941 (Land Operations) (in Greek). Athens: Hellenic Army General Staff, Army History Directorate. ISBN 9789607897015.
