= Konstantinos Kallaris =

- Κωνσταντίνος Καλλάρης
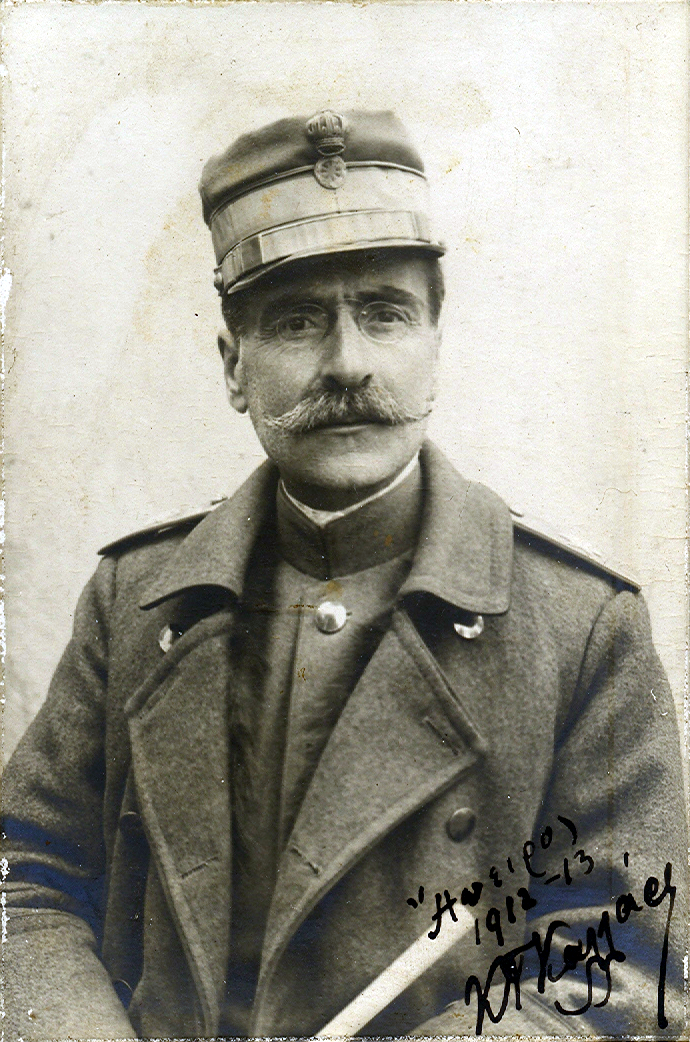
- Konstantinos Kallaris c. 1912–13

Minister of Military Affairs
- In office 22 June – 16 September 1916
- Monarch: Constantine I
- Prime Minister: Alexandros Zaimis

Personal details
- Born: 20 September 1858 Athens, Kingdom of Greece
- Died: 4 May 1940 (aged 81) Athens, Kingdom of Greece
- Education: Hellenic Army Academy

Military service
- Allegiance: Kingdom of Greece
- Branch/service: Hellenic Army
- Years of service: 1880–1918
- Rank: Lieutenant General
- Commands: 2nd Infantry Division; I Army Corps
- Battles/wars: Greco-Turkish War (1897); Balkan Wars; First Balkan War; Battle of Bizani; Second Balkan War; Battle of Kilkis-Lachanas; Battle of Kresna Gorge

Konstantinos Kallaris (Greek: Κωνσταντίνος Καλλάρης; 1858–1940) was a senior Hellenic Army officer who distinguished himself in the Balkan Wars of 1912–1913.

Born in Athens in 1858, Kallaris studied at the Hellenic Army Academy and was commissioned into the Army on 28 July 1880 as an Ensign of Engineers. He fought in the Greco-Turkish War of 1897. Due to his extensive education, he was placed in the General Staff Corps upon its creation in 1905. In early 1911 he was placed as commander of the 2nd Infantry Division at Athens, which quickly became a model formation under the supervision of the French military mission to Greece.

Promoted to Major General, he led his division in the First Balkan War, where he lost one of his sons, Spyridon, during the Battle of Bizani (his second son Angelos fell in the Asia Minor Campaign in 1922). Kallaris led the 2nd Division in the Second Balkan War as well, first in the attack against the Bulgarian garrison in Thessaloniki and thereafter in the battles of Kilkis and Kresna.

In 1914, promoted to Lieutenant General, he assumed command of the newly established I Army Corps. He served briefly as Minister of Military Affairs in the summer of 1916, and retired from service on 29 June 1918.

He died in 1940.

== Sources ==
- Μεγάλη Στρατιωτικὴ καὶ Ναυτικὴ Ἐγκυκλοπαιδεία. Tόμος Τέταρτος: Καβάδης–Μωριάς [Great Military and Naval Encyclopaedia. Volume IV: Kavadh–Morea] (in Greek). Athens: Ἔκδοσις Μεγάλης Στρατιωτικῆς καὶ Ναυτικῆς Ἐγκυκλοπαιδείας. 1929. OCLC 31255024.
