= Georgios Kosmas =

Greek general (1884–1964)

- Γεώργιος Κοσμάς
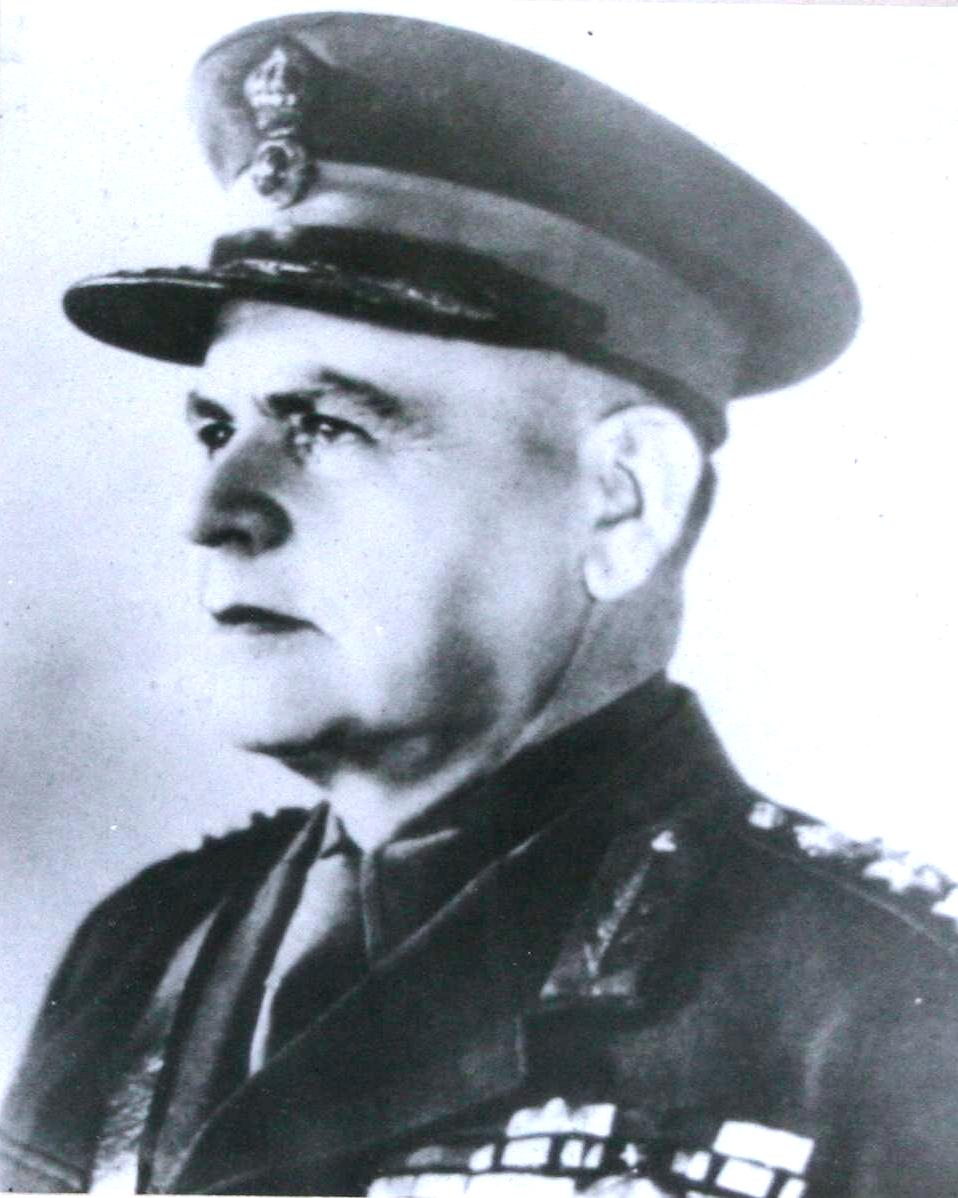
- Kosmas c. 1939
- Born: 1884; Falanthi, Messenia, Kingdom of Greece
- Died: 1964
- Education: National Technical University of Athens; National and Kapodistrian University of Athens
- Military career
- Allegiance: Kingdom of Greece; Second Hellenic Republic
- Branch: Hellenic Army
- Service years: 1904–1941; 1945–1951
- Rank: Lieutenant general
- Commands: 14th Infantry Division (Chief of Staff); 3rd Infantry Division; Chief of the Hellenic Army General Staff
- Wars: Balkan Wars: First Balkan War; Second Balkan War; World War I: Macedonian front; Greco-Turkish War of 1919–22; World War II: Greco-Italian War; Battle of Greece; Greek Resistance (POW)
- Other work: Minister for Northern Greece; MP

Georgios Kosmas (Greek: Γεώργιος Κοσμάς, 1884–1964) was a senior Hellenic Army officer who distinguished himself in the Greco-Italian War of 1940–1941, served as Chief of the Hellenic Army General Staff in 1949–51, and became a Member of the Hellenic Parliament and cabinet minister.

== Life ==
Georgios Kosmas was born in 1884 in the village of Falanthi in Messenia, in southern Greece. He enlisted in the Hellenic Army as a volunteer on 17 January 1904, and after studies at the NCO School, was commissioned as an Artillery Second Lieutenant on 7 July 1912 (O.S.). He participated in the Balkan Wars of 1912–13 as commander of a machine gun section, and was promoted to Lieutenant in 1913 and to Captain in 1915. He served on the Macedonian front during World War I as a staff officer, being promoted to major in 1918.

In the Asia Minor Campaign, he served as chief of staff of the 14th Infantry Division. In 1923 he was promoted to Lt. Colonel and appointed head of the committee for the determination of the Greco-Albanian border. During the Interwar period he served as commander of the 30th Infantry Regiment and of the Evros Border Sector, chief of staff of IV Army Corps and commander of 3rd Infantry Division, while advancing to Colonel (1925) and major general (1934). At the same time he attended various military schools, and graduated from the Athens Polytechnic Telegraphers' School and the University of Athens Law School.

A Lt. General in 1940, he served as commander of IV Corps, V Corps ("K" Group of Divisions) and I Corps during the Greco-Italian War of 1940–41. Following the German invasion of Greece in April 1941 and the Greek capitulation, he remained in the country until his arrest and deportation to concentration camps in Germany for participating in the Greek Resistance. He was among the high-profile prisoners of Dachau concentration camp liberated at Tirol in April 1945.

After his return to Greece, he served as Governor-general of Western Thrace in 1947–48, before being appointed as Chief of the Hellenic Army General Staff on 21 January 1949, a post he held until his retirement on 16 March 1951. Kosmas then entered politics, being repeatedly elected an MP and serving in the cabinet of Alexandros Papagos as Minister Governor-general of Northern Greece from 15 December 1954 to 24 May 1955, when he became the first Minister for Northern Greece, remaining in the post until 6 October 1955.

Georgios Kosmas died in 1964.

Political offices
Preceded by Andreas Stratos	Minister for Northern Greece (until 24 May 1955 "Minister Governor-General for Northern Greece"); 15 December 1954 – 6 October 1955	Succeeded by Dimitrios Babakos
Military offices
Preceded by Lt General Dimitrios Giatzis	Chief of the Hellenic Army General Staff; 21 January 1949 – 16 March 1951	Succeeded by Lt General Theodoros Grigoropoulos
