= Carlo Geloso =

Italian general (1879–1957)

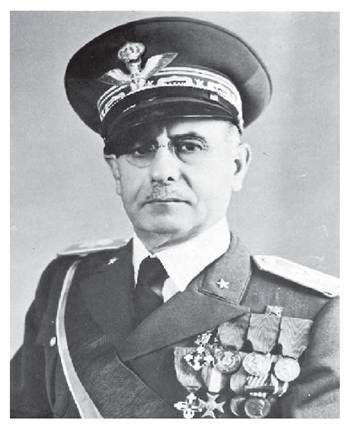
- Born: 20 August 1879; Palermo, Italy
- Died: 23 July 1957 (aged 77); Rome, Italy
- Military career
- Allegiance: Kingdom of Italy
- Branch: Royal Italian Army
- Service years: 1898–1943, 1947
- Rank: Army general
- Units: 21st Infantry Division Granatieri di Sardegna; XXVI Army Corps; Eleventh Army

Carlo Geloso (20 August 1879 – 23 July 1957) was an Italian general during the Second World War. In 1939, he assumed command of the Italian forces in Albania. In 1940, he served as commander of the 11th Army during the Greco-Italian War. He was the commander of the Italian occupation forces in Greece from 1941 to 1943. After Italy joined the Allies, he became a German prisoner-of-war. After the German surrender, he was briefly imprisoned by the Soviets but was released in 1946.

== Early life and career ==
Born in Palermo on 20 August 1879 to Bonaventura Geloso and Fortunata Burgio di Villanova, Carlo Geloso entered the Military Academy of Artillery and Engineers of Turin on 27 October 1898. After graduation, he was commissioned as a second lieutenant of artillery on 26 August 1901 and continued his studies at the Application School of Artillery and Engineers at Turin. He graduated in 1903 and being promoted to lieutenant on 11 August. He was assigned to the 3rd Fortress Artillery Regiment. On 28 December 1907 he wed Angela Rocaglia, and in April 1909, he was transferred to the 15th Field Artillery Regiment. He successfully completed the general staff course in Turin in 1910, and was promoted to captain by selection (before the regular promotion period) on 30 November 1911. Until 1912, he served in the staffs the Territorial Military Divisions of Rome and then Naples. In July 1912, he embarked for Tripolitania, to establish a commissariat for the Italian expeditionary corps at Zuara. He returned to Italy on 5 August, but he remained in command of the commissariat until April 1914, when he was appointed to the 9th Fortress Artillery Regiment.

== World War I ==
After Italy entered World War I, he was sent to serve in a staff position in the Julian Alps Front. On 9 November 1915, he was promoted to major. In May 1916, he was appointed chief of staff of the 31st Infantry Division. His participation in the Sixth Battle of the Isonzo with the division earned him his first Silver Medal of Military Valor. In February 1917, he was transferred to the general staff. In May he won his second Silver Medal of Military Valor for his participation in the Tenth Battle of the Isonzo in the Bosco Malo-Pod Horite area and was promoted to lieutenant-colonel on 31 May. As chief of staff of the 65th Infantry Division from July, he fought in the Eleventh Battle of the Isonzo in the Mešnjak area and won his third Silver Medal in the process, and then, he fought in the disastrous Battle of Caporetto. From April 1918 he was chief of staff of the 34th Infantry Division. His organizational ability was recognised in September by a commendation and the award of a knighthood in the Military Order of Savoy. After the armistice, he spent some time in the Tonale–Garda area, moved to the post of commandant in Padua and then joined the Rome garrison and the general staff.

== Interwar period ==
Despite his distinguished if unexceptional career, from 20 July 1920 to 7 March 1925 he was relegated to a "Special Auxiliary Position", a special arrangement intended to handle the large number of officers after the end of the war. During that time, he became a member of the Italian Fascist Party on 4 May 1921 and was promoted to colonel on 31 December 1924.

On his return to active duty in 1925, he was assigned to the General Secretariat of the Supreme Commission on Defence, and he left the service from February 1926. He remained at that post until 1 March 1928, when he was sent to command the 6th Heavy Field Artillery Regiment.

On 25 January 1931 he was promoted brigadier general, and in March 1931, he returned to Rome as chief of staff to the VIII Army Corps. He then served as artillery commander of the III Army Corps at Milan in 1933, before being appointed acting chief of staff for the X Army Corps at Naples in 1934 and for the VI Army Corps at Bologna in 1935. On 25 November 1935, he was appointed to the highly-prestigious and sought-after post of commander of the Granatieri di Sardegna Infantry Division in Rome.

=== Ethiopia and Albania ===
In March 1936 he was sent to Italian Somaliland to command the Special Infantry Division "Laghi" during the Second Italo-Ethiopian War. There, he occupied the area of the equatorial area and defeated the Ethiopian ras Desta Damtew. In October 1936 he became governor of the area, now the Galla-Sidamo Governorate, as well as commander of the local Italian garrison. For his service, he was promoted to divisional general in December and received a further Military Order of Savoy. He remained at that position until 1938. His violent suppression of Ethiopian resistance, particularly in the wake of a failed assassination attempt on Viceroy Rodolfo Graziani in February 1937, led to him being listed as a war criminal by the Ethiopian government, which attempted to have him extradited to Ethiopia after the Second World War.

In 1938, he returned to Rome, until 3 August as Honorary Governor of Galla-Sidamo, but in 1939, he was promoted to army corps general and sent to command the Bari Army Corps. Promoted to army corps general, he was sent in October to command first the VII Army Corps at Trieste and then, on 1 December, the XXVI Army Corps, comprising the Italian garrison (XXVI Army Corps) in Italian-occupied Albania.

Geloso remained in Albania until 6 June 1940. During his tenure, he planned for an attack on Greece, and elements of his plans were indeed used in the subsequent Italian invasion of Greece, but it was under quite different conditions and participating forces from his plans. Although a capable organiser, he was helpless in the backroom political manoeuvring that characterized the Fascist regime. After disagreeing with Foreign Minister Galeazzo Ciano, Mussolini's heir-apparent, during a discussion of a possible war with Greece on 23 April 1941, he was replaced by Sebastiano Visconti Prasca.

== World War II and occupation of Greece ==
Italy's entry into World War II found him as head of the Third Army, but he returned to Albania on 15 November 1940 to take up command of the newly formed Eleventh Army in the ongoing war against Greece. After the German invasion of Greece and the start of the country's occupation, in September 1941 he was named Supreme Commander of the Italian Armed Forces in Greece, while remaining commander of Eleventh Army. He kept both positions until his dismissal in May 1943. In October 1942, he was promoted to army general.

His tenure in Greece earned him criticism from many sides. The Greeks naturally resented him as the commander-in-chief of the Italian occupation forces and the brutality that he displayed in anti-partisan operations. However, the Italians' German allies considered him too "weak" and ineffective despite his reputation as a loyal adherent to the Axis alliance. Geloso opposed the Germans' demands for even harsher retaliations and even resisted the demands for implementation of discriminatory measures against Greek Jews in the Italian occupation zone. On the other hand, Geloso in spring 1943 approved the institution of collective punishment against the civilian population in retaliation for partisan attacks, including measures such as "aerial bombardment and heavy artillery fire", the "pillaging of their food supplies", and "the deportation to concentration camps of the village chiefs and all of the men who made up the community council". That order led to a series of atrocities over the following months, such as the Domenikon massacre.

At the same time, Geloso's relations with the Germans became increasingly strained, as he jealously guarded the Italian prerogatives in Greece against German encroachments, particularly after the appointment of Colonel-General Alexander Löhr as the German Commander-in-chief Southeast in December 1942. The appointment came as a result of the worsening situation on the North African Front, which made an Allied landing in Greece increasingly likely. The Germans, who did not trust the Italians' ability to withstand such an attack, began moving more of their own troops into Greece, sought to supplant the Italians in certain strategic areas including Athens and the Athens–Thessaloniki railway and justified the move by thereby making additional Italian troops available to defend western Greece. Geloso vehemently refused to consider that and, in a later meeting, counter proposed for any additional German forces in Greece to be placed under his command. With the backing of the Italian high command, the situation remained unresolved, with Geloso even proposing setting up an "Army Group East" under his command, comprising all Italian forces in the occupied areas of the Balkans, as a counterpart bans counterweight to Löhr's command, with himself at its head.

Despite being highly praised by the chief of the Italian General Staff, Ugo Cavallero, as "perhaps the best of our generals, technically prepared, energetic and tactful", Geloso was dismissed on 3 May and placed under the disposition of the Ministry of War. The likely reason was his final disagreement with Löhr in a meeting a few days earlier. Löhr demanded from the Italians a series of measures to curb the growing Greek Resistance, including the arrest of the officers of the Greek army, the confiscation of all radios and the handover of all Jews in the Italian zone to German control. An Italian investigation, headed by Admiral Domenico Cavagnari, into his tenure in Greece ended up absolving him of all charges brought against him for malpractice and corruption.

== Imprisonment and release ==
On 20 June 1943, he was placed in the reserve because of his advanced age but was recalled to service attached to the Ministry of War. In the days before the Italian armistice, he was placed in command of the troops intended to defend Rome, but he never actually exercised a field command. He was captured by the Germans on 23 September and sent to an officers' camp at Schokken. He was liberated by the arrival of Red Army troops, sent to Kharkov, and thence returned to Italy on 9 October 1945. During his imprisonment, Geloso wrote to Graziani, the Minister of War in the Italian Social Republic (RSI), asking for his intervention to secure his release; but, appeared not to have joined the RSI. On his return to Italy, he was asked to compile a series of memoranda on his fellow prisoners and their behaviour in captivity.

== Later life ==
He was placed on leave on 1 February 1946 but was recalled to temporary service from 27 April to 30 June 1947. On 28 May 1947, the Italian monarchy having been abolished the previous year he swore an oath of loyalty to the new Italian Republic. On 1 May 1954, he was placed in permanent leave because of his advanced age. He died at Rome on 23 July 1957.

== Sources ==
- Bregantin, Lisa (2010). L'occupazione dimenticata. Gli italiani in Grecia 1941-1943 [The Forgotten Occupation. The Italians in Greece 1941–1943] (PhD thesis) (in Italian). Università Ca’ Foscari di Venezia. Archived from the original on 2019-01-17.
