= Sebastiano Visconti Prasca =

Italian general

Conti (Count) Sebastiano Visconti Prasca
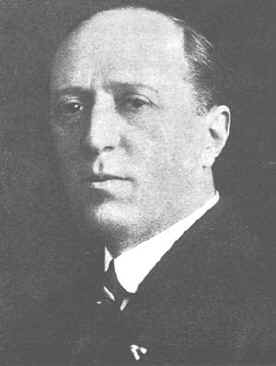
- Born: 27 February 1883; Rome, Italy
- Died: 25 February 1961 (aged 77) Monte Porzio Catone, Italy
- Allegiance: Kingdom of Italy
- Branch: Royal Army
- Service years: 1904–1940
- Rank: General designate
- Commands: 36th Infantry Regiment; Italian corps, Territory of the Saar Basin; 5th Infantry Division "Cosseria"; 2nd Cavalry Division "Emanuele Filiberto Testa di Ferro"; III Army Corps; Albanian Army Corps Command; Higher Forces Command Albania (XXVI Army Corps); 11th Army
- Conflicts: Italo-Turkish War; World War I; Italian front; World War II; Greco-Italian War; Italian resistance

Sebastiano Visconti Prasca (27 February 1883, Rome – 25 February 1961, Monte Porzio Catone) was an Italian general. A veteran of the Italo-Turkish War of 1911–1912 and World War I, he led the initial offensive of the Greco-Italian War in 1940 during World War II, but was relieved of his command after two weeks for incompetence and relieved by General Ubaldo Soddu.

== Biography ==
=== Early life and ancestry ===
Sebastiano Visconti Prasca was born in Rome on 27 February 1883. He was a member of the noble family of the House of Visconti, patricians of Alessandria.

=== Career ===
==== Early career and World War I ====
Visconti Prasca joined the Italian Royal Army (Regio Esercito) and began studies at the Royal Military Academy of Infantry and Cavalry in Modena, from which he graduated in 1904. He was commissioned with the rank of sottotenente (English: sub-lieutenant) on 5 September 1904. Promoted to tenente (English: lieutenant) on 5 September 1907, he participated in the Italo-Turkish War of 1911–1912, for which he received an award of the Bronze Medal of Military Valor. He was promoted to capitano (English: captain) on 31 December 1914. Italy entered World War I in May 1915, and during the war he served on the Italian front from 1915 to 1918, receiving a promotion first to maggiore (English: major) and then on 1 November 1917 to tenente colonnello (English: lieutenant colonel). He also received a second award of the Bronze Medal of Military Valor, as well as the War Merit Cross.

==== Interwar period ====
Visconti Prasca attended the Turin Army War School, then was attached to the Army General Staff on 20 October 1919. In January 1920 he went to Germany as a member of the Inter-Allied Commission for Upper Silesia. In 1921 he returned to Italy, where on 21 April 1921 he left the general staff and began duty in the Ministry of War. This duty ended when he was attached to the Army Council on 26 October 1922.

On 3 March 1924, Visconti Prasca became military attaché at the Embassy of the Kingdom of Italy in Belgrade in the Kingdom of Serbs, Croats, and Slovenes, which was renamed the Kingdom of Yugoslavia in 1928. He remained there for six years, during which time he was promoted to colonnello (English: colonel) on either 26 December 1926 or 9 June 1927, according to different sources. Prime Minister of Italy Benito Mussolini developed a special regard for him, reflected in notes made in 1931 by General Pietro Gacchera. Visconti Prasca was recalled to Italy on 20 April 1930 after the Government of Yugoslavia bluntly accused him of espionage. He returned briefly to the general staff while awaiting orders, then assumed command of the 36th Infantry Regiment on 1 October 1930. He relinquished command of the regiment on 16 January 1933, when he was attached to the Army of Bologna, in which he led the military administration of the city of Bologna, Italy.

On 10 October 1933, Visconti Prasca was appointed to the office of the Chief of the Army General Staff, General Pietro Badoglio. That same month, he published a book on military strategy under the title Guerra decisiva (English: Decisive War), in which he developed the theory of what was known in Germany as blitzkrieg (English: lightning war), Mussolini himself read the book, which may have decisively influenced many of the events that led to the outbreak of the Second Italo-Ethiopian War of 1935–1936. In April 1934, as an envoy of Badoglio, Visconti Prasca made a reconnaissance visit to the Colony of Eritrea. After his return to Italy, he drew up a report which helped to organize the operational plans for the Italian invasion of Ethiopia, which were implemented in 1935.

Visconti Prasca received a promotion to generale di brigata (English: brigadier general) for "exceptional merit" on 18 October 1934, but Badoglio decided to remove him from his general staff duties in 1934, as he was suspected of disclosing a secret agreement that Badoglio had concluded with the French general Maurice Gamelin. According to one source, Visconti Prasca was assigned to the general staff "for special duties" as of 18 October 1934, serving in this capacity until 11 September 1935. On 12 December 1934, Visconti Prasca took command of the Italian expeditionary corps in the Territory of the Saar Basin, occupied under a League of Nations mandate, in a move related to a League of Nations requirement for the supervision of local elections there. He served in the Saar either until January 1935 or 5 March 1935, according to different sources.

Either in January 1935 or on 11 July 1935, according to different sources, Visconti Prasca became an honorary adjutant to King Victor Emmanuel III. Sources differ on his subsequent assignments, claiming both that on 16 September 1935 he either assumed command or became deputy commander of the 5th Infantry Division "Cosseria" and that he was attached to the Ministry of War on 18 October 1935 before becoming deputy commander of the division at a later date. He remained in command of the division until 20 July 1937.

Sources again differ on his assignments later in the 1930s. Some claim that he became military attaché at the Italian embassy Paris on 20 July 1937, another that he assumed command of the 2nd Cavalry Division "Emanuele Filiberto Testa di Ferro" in December 1937 and did not become military attaché at Paris until 1938. On 9 September 1937 he was promoted to the rank of generale di divisione (divisional general), with seniority from 1 July 1937, and on 31 March 1938, by royal decree, he was granted the title of conte (English: count). Once he became the military attaché he followed the deterioration of relations between Italy and France after Nazi Germany occupied Czechoslovakia in September 1938. He was still in Paris when World War II began with the German invasion of Poland on 1 September 1939. Always considered a Francophile, he declared a few months after the outbreak of the war that it was inevitable that the Allies would defeat Germany.

Visconti Prasca was recalled to Italy on 15 December 1939, when he was appointed to the Ministry of War for "special duties." Sources differ on his next assignments: Some claim he detached from his Ministry of War duties on 1 March 1940 and then was placed at the disposal of the army chief of staff until 5 June 1940, while another claims that for a short time in early 1940 he commanded III Army Corps on the Italian border with France as Italy made preparations to enter the war on the side of the Axis powers. Sources also disagree on the date of his promotion to the rank of army corps general (Italian: generale di corpo d'armata), giving it as 15 October 1939, with seniority from 1 July 1939, as 1 June 1940, and as 15 October 1940.

==== Greco-Italian War ====
On 26 May 1940, following a suggestion by the Minister of Foreign Affairs, Galeazzo Ciano, and the Deputy Chief of the General Staff of the Army, General Ubaldo Soddu, Visconti Prasca was appointed to replace General Carlo Geloso as commander-in-chief of the Italian armed forces in Albania, which Italy had invaded and occupied in April 1939. During his introductory meeting with Mussolini, which took place at the Palazzo Venezia in Rome, there was no discussion of war with Greece or Yugoslavia. Upon his arrival in Albania, he took command on 5 June 1940 of Higher Forces Command Albania (XXVI Army Corps), a reinforced corps of approximately 100,000 men created on 1 December 1939 by the merger of the Higher Forces Command Albania (Italian: Comando Superiore Truppe Albania) and the Albania Army Corps Command (Italian: Comando Corpo d'Armata Albania). His command included five Italian divisions — the 3rd Alpine Division "Julia", 19th Infantry Division "Venezia", 23rd Infantry Division "Ferrara", 53rd Infantry Division "Arezzo", and 131st Armored Division "Centauro" — as well as auxiliary units and Albanian divisions which numerically corresponded to the equivalent of approximately two more divisions. Upon assuming his duties as a commander in Albania, Visconti Prasca was directly active in the formation of certain Albanian irregular forces under the command of Jaffer Bey Ipi and Kazim Bey Kokuli.

On 10 June 1940, Italy entered World War II, invading France during the Battle of France in a campaign that resulted in France's capitulation and an Italian armistice with France that went into effect on 25 June 1940. On 1 July 1940, Visconti Prasca became commander-in-chief in Albania. According to one source, he also became a generale designato (English: general designate) that day, although another source claims this did not take place until 9 November 1940.

During July 1940, Mussolini, pushed by Ciano, decided to attack a neutral country without consulting with Nazi Germany first in order to compensate for Marshal of Italy Rodolfo Graziani's hesitance to invade Egypt from Libya and to compete with the military successes of the German Wehrmacht. He selected the Kingdom of Greece as the target in the belief that the Greeks lacked a desire for war and that an Italian conquest of Greece would be easy.

The Italian Army General Staff proceeded to organize an invasion plan, which was known as "Esigenza G" or "Emergenza G." Following an order from Mussolini, General Geloso drew up the initial operational plan after his return from Albania. It provided for the invasion of the Epirus region using an Italian force of 11 divisions, two cavalry regiments, and a grenadier regiment, but also required the Bulgarian Army to attack Western Thrace, forcing part of the Greek forces to withdraw from the Epirus front. The next plan provided for the use of 20 Italian divisions and their logistical support, all of which would already be in Albania before the start of hostilities. On 11 August 1940 Ciano summoned Visconti Prasca to Rome, where Ciano informed him of the decision to invade the Chameria region, as well as the Ionian Islands, instructing him to prepare for the start of operations before the end of August 1940.

Visconti Prasca returned to Tirana, Albania, where he worked for a long time to draw up a plan for the invasion of Greece, which presupposed the use of four divisione binaria (English: double divisions), i.e. divisions composed of only two infantry regiments each, which would carry out an attack along a front of approximately 60 miles (97 km). On 13 October 1940, Mussolini made the official decision to attack Greece and conveyed it to Badoglio during a summit meeting attended by Mussolini, Badoglio, Ciano, and Francesco Giacomoni di San. Savino, with the date for the start of military operations set for 26 October 1940. On 14 October 1940, Badoglio, after learning of Ciano's meeting with Visconti Prasca, ordered Visconti Prasca to obey only the orders that came from the Italian Army General Staff.

The start of military operations was postponed from 26 to 28 October 1940, but on 28 October 1940, as the winter season approached, the Italian troops launched their attack along the steep and dangerous mountainous terrain that formed the Epirus front, encountering little resistance during their advance, with the result that Visconti Prasca sent a telegram to Rome to report Italian forces were advancing at a "rapid pace." However, due to the adverse weather conditions, as well as the beginning of Greek Army counterattacks ordered by the chief of the general staff of the Greek Army, Alexandros Papagos, the Italian advance was halted on 8 November 1940.

Visconti Prasca's personal assurances that the initial forces under his command would prove sufficient, and that the Italian invasion would meet feeble Greek resistance, had helped to convince Mussolini to launch the invasion and was one of the factors leading to the disaster. Overly confident in Greek weakness and the perfection of his invasion plan, Visconti Pracsa had done little to prepare his troops for combat and failed to ensure their logistical support, even neglecting such basic requirements as the provision of mules to carry supplies through the mountains, leaving the Italians not only in danger of failing to conquer Greek territory but of losing territory in Albania. Mussolini, outraged at Visconti Prasca's handling of the invasion, removed him from command of the troops on 8 November 1940, the same day the initial Italian advance halted, replacing him with General Ubaldo Soddu. Upon arriving in Albania, Soddu deemed the initial attack a failure and ordered Italian forces to shift immediately to a defensive stance. On 9 November 1940, Visconti Prasca became commander of the 11th Army, which was created that day by a merger of the Higher Forces Command Albania (XXVI Army Corps), VI Army Corps, and VIII Army Corps (formerly the Chameria Army Corps), deployed along the southern sector of the front along a belt stretching from the Pindus mountain range to the Ionian Sea. He criticized Soddu's defensive provisions, and on 16 November 1940 was relieved of command of the 11th Army.

Visconti Prasca returned to Italy, where he was placed at the disposal of the Ministry of War. On 10 December 1940, he was transferred to the reserve and retired from the army.

=== Later life ===
After Italy surrendered to the Allies on 8 September 1943, Visconti Prasca joined the Italian resistance movement against the German occupation forces in Italy. On 24 October 1943 he was arrested, and subsequently he was sentenced to death. His sentence was commuted to imprisonment on German soil, where he was a prisoner-of-war at Offizierslager 64/Z (English: Officers Camp 64/Z) in Skoki (German: Schokken), Poland, from which he was released in April or May 1945 along with a number of senior officers of the Soviet Red Army. He subsequently witnessed the entry of Soviet troops into Berlin during the Battle of Berlin. World War II ended in Europe with Germany's surrender to the Western Allies on 8 May 1945 and to the Soviet Union on 9 May.

After his return to Italy in October 1945, Visconti Prasca published his autobiography under the title Io ho aggredito la Grecia (English: I Attacked Greece) (Rizzoli, 1946), a contrived effort on his part for personal rehabilitation in which he tried to diminish his personal responsibility for the defeat of the Italian army on the Greek front and justify his personal errors in command. On several occasions after the war he tried unsuccessfully to return to active duty, asking the President of Italy, Luigi Einaudi, to reconsider his appeal against the decision to retire him in 1940, but he never returned to active service.

== Personal life ==
Visconti Prasca was married to Angelica Zoppi, the sister of generale designato (English: general designate) and Senator Octavio Zoppi.

Visconti Prasca was Grand Master of the Synodal Military Order of the Knights of Omonia. From 1951 until his death, he was Grand Master of the Sovereign Military Order of St. George of Carinthia.

== Death ==
Visconti Prasca died in Monte Porzio Catone, Italy, near Rome, on 25 February 1961.

== Honors and awards ==
- Bronze Medal of Military Valor (two awards)
- War Merit Cross
- Commemorative Medal for the Italo-Turkish War 1911–1912
- Commemorative Medal of the Expedition to Albania
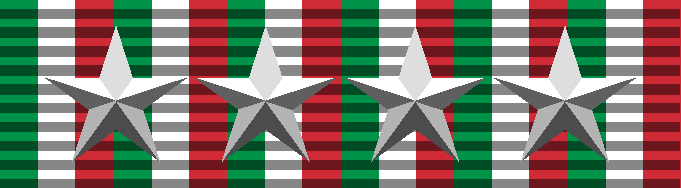
- Commemorative Medal for the Italo-Austrian War 1915–1918 (four years of campaign)
- Commemorative Medal of the Unity of Italy
- Allied Victory Medal
- Knight of the Order of Saints Maurice and Lazarus (5th Class)
- Officer of the Order of Saints Maurice and Lazarus (4th Class) (21 October 1930)
- Commander of the Order of Saints Maurice and Lazarus (3rd Class) (16 May 1940)
- Grand Officer of the Order of Saints Maurice and Lazarus (2nd Class) (15 April 1940)
- Knight of the Order of the Crown of Italy
- Officer of the Order of the Crown of Italy
- Commander of the Order of the Crown of Italy (Royal Decree of 13 January 1924)
- Grand Officer of the Order of the Crown of Italy (2 May 1935)

Visconti Prasca received his first Bronze Medal of Military Valor for his actions in 1912 during the Italo-Turkish War, the citation reading, "Responsible for conveying orders and briefings to the various military units, despite being slightly wounded at the start of the fighting, he continued his work with courage and bravery throughout the day. Merkeb, January 27, 1912."

His second award of the bronze medal for Military Valor was for his actions from 1915 to 1917 on the Italian front during World War I, the citation reading, "During more than two years of war, in a number of different situations, he carried out daring reconnaissance missions along the front, while as an officer he relayed orders between the different military units, displaying determination and ignorance of danger. Medio Izontso, May 1915 - September 1917."

== Sources ==
=== Books ===
- Bigini, Antonello; Gionfrida, Alessandro (1997). Lo stato maggiore generale tra le due guerre (in Italian). Rome: Ufficio Storico dello Stato Maggiore dell'Esercito.
- Cervi, Mario (1965). Storia della guerra di Grecia (in Italian). Milan: Rizzoli Editore.
- Gin, Emilio (2012) [1947]. L'ora segnata dal destino: gli alleati e Mussolini da Monaco all'intervento. Settembre 1938-Giugno 1940 (in Italian). Rome: Edizioni Nuova Cultura. ISBN 978-88-6134-831-8.
- Kennedy, David M. (2007). The Library of Congress World War II Companion. New York: Simon & Schuster. ISBN 978-1-4165-5306-9.
- Knox, McGregor (1982). Mussolini Unleashed, 1939–1941: Politics and Strategy in Fascist Italy's Last War. Cambridge: Cambridge University Press. ISBN 0-521-33835-2.
- Montanari, Mario (1980). La campagna di Grecia (in Italian). Rome: Ufficio Storico dello Stato Maggiore dell'Esercito.
- Pearson, Owen (2006). Albania in the Twentieth Century, A History: Volume II: Albania in Occupation and War. New York: IB Tauris & Co, Ltd. ISBN 1-84511-104-4.
- Visconti-Prasca, Sebastiano (1947). Io ho aggredito la Grecia (in Italian). Milan: Rizzoli Editore.
- Trionfi, Maria (2014). Il diario dell'attesa: storia di una famiglia 1943-1945 (in Italian). Milan: Biblioteka Edizioni. ISBN 978-88-98801-03-9.
- Vento, Andrea (2010). In silenzio gioite e soffrite: storia dei servizi segreti italiani dal Risorgimento alla Guerra Fredda (in Italian). Milan: Il Saggiatore. ISBN 978-88-428-1604-1.
- Cecini, Giovanni (2016). I generali di Mussolini (in Italian). Rome: Newton & Compton Editori. ISBN 978-8-85419-868-5.

=== Periodicals ===
- Minniti, Fortunato (March 1994). "Oltre Adua. Lo sviluppo e la scelta della strategia operativa per la guerra contro l'Etiopia". Società di Storia Militare Quaderno 1993 (in Italian). Rome: Gruppo Editoriale Internazionale: 85–142. ISBN 88-8011-043-8.
