= Generale d'armata =

Former Italian military rank

Generale d'Armata (literally: Field Army General) is a former Italian military rank equating to a "full general" (see General Officer). It was one of the ranks, along with Field Marshal (Maresciallo d'Italia) and General of the Army (Generale dell'Esercito), that was eligible to hold the appointment of Chief of the General Staff (Capo di Stato Maggiore Generale della Difesa), established in 1925. When the appointment was reformed in 1948 to that of Chief of the Defence Staff officers of the lower rank of Army Corps General became eligible for the position

== See also ==
- Italian Army Ranks
