= 15th Infantry Regiment (Greece) =

Hellenic Army unit

15th Infantry Regiment (XV Inf Div)
- 15ο Σύνταγμα Πεζικού (XV ΜΠ)
- Camp flag of the 15th Infantry Brigade
- Active: 2013–present
- Country: Greece
- Branch: Hellenic Army
- Type: Infantry
- Size: Regiment
- Part of: 9th Infantry Brigade
- Garrison/HQ: Kastoria, Western Macedonia
- Mottos: This Number Is Sufficient; Και ούτος ο αριθμός ικανός Ke utos o arithmos ikanos
- Anniversaries: 6 November 1940

15th Infantry Regiment (XV Inf Div) (Greek: 15ο Σύνταγμα Πεζικού (15ο ΣΠ), romanized: 15o Syntagma Pezikoú, 15o SP) is an infantry regiment of the Hellenic Army recently (2013) reduced in size from a brigade. The brigade was formed on 31 March 1998 when the 15th Infantry Division was reduced in size as part of a force restructuring in the Hellenic Army.

== History ==
On 31 March 1998, after a Hellenic Army force restructure, the 15th Infantry Division was reduced to a brigade-level formation and renamed as the 15th Infantry Brigade (Greek: 15η Ταξιαρχία Πεζικού, 15η ΤΑΞΠΖ). It evolved into a motorized infantry role in 2011 and, as a result, was renamed the 15th Motorized Infantry Brigade "PYXOS" (Greek: 15η Μηχανοποιημένη Ταξιαρχία Πεζικού «ΠΥΞΟΣ» (15η Μ/Π ΤΑΞΠΖ), romanized: 15 Mekhanopiiméni Taxiarkhía Pezikoú, 15 M/P TAXPZ). The honorific Pyxós (Greek: Πυξός), a Byzantine settlement on the western peninsula of Lake Prespa (near the town of Vrontero), was given to the brigade in recognition of its historic defense of the area as the 15th Infantry Division.

On 6 November 2012, in anticipation of an upcoming defense review and its expected disbandment as a combat formation, the brigade commemorated its 72 years of service with a ceremony in Argos Orestiko. The occasion also included a remembrance ceremony for the 112 officers and 5812 enlisted soldiers who lost their lives in its (and, primarily, the 15th Infantry Division's) service.

In April 2013 KYSEA decided the disbandment of the brigade as part of a new force structure for the Hellenic Army. However, within months, it was decided that the brigade would eventually be reduced to the level of a regiment. The brigade was officially reorganized and renamed the 15th Infantry Regiment "XV Inf. Div." (Greek: 15ο Σύνταγμα Πεζικού «XV ΜΠ» (15ο ΣΠ «XV ΜΠ»), romanized: 15 Sýntagma Pezikoú "XV MP"), on 13 November 2014 and placed under the command of the NDC-GR.

== Emblem and Motto ==
The emblem of the original 15th Infantry Division - a labrys-wielding griffin (Greek: Γρύψ), symbolizing strength, speed and vigilant guard - was carried-over to the 15th Infantry Brigade in 1998.

The brigade's motto is This Number Is Sufficient (Greek: Και Ούτος Ο Αριθμός Ικανός, romanized: Ké Oútos o Arithmós Ikanós). The phrase was attributed to Leonidas when he was in charge of guarding the narrow mountain pass at Thermopylae with just 7,000 Greek men in order to delay the invading Persian army. He was asked why he had come to fight such a huge host with so few men. Leonidas answered, "If numbers are what matters, all Greece cannot match a small part of that army; but if courage is what counts, this number is sufficient." (Greek: «τω πλήθει, ουδέ η πάσα Ελλάς αρκεί· βραχεία γαρ μοίρα του εκείνων πλήθους εστίν· ει δε ταις αρεταίς, και ούτος ο αριθμός ικανός»).

== Structure (2016) ==
- HQ (ΛΔ/15ου ΣΠ) at Kastoria.
- 574th Motorized Infantry Battalion (574 M/Π ΤΠ) based at Kastoria.
- 585th Motorized Infantry Battalion (585 M/Π ΤΠ EKE) based at Argos Orestiko
- 15th Support Battalion (15 ΤΥΠ)
- 15th Signal Company (15 ΛΔΒ)
- 15th Engineer Company (15 ΛΜΧ)
