= 11th Army (Italy) =

- 11ª Armata
- Active: 9 November 1940 – September 1943
- Country: Kingdom of Italy
- Branch: Royal Italian Army
- Type: Field army
- Engagements: Greco-Italian War, Italian occupation of Greece

The 11th Army (Italian: 11ª Armata) was a World War II field army of the Royal Italian Army. It was formed in November 1940 for service in the Greco-Italian War, and after the German invasion of Greece and the capitulation of that country in April 1941, assumed occupation duties in the Greek mainland. It remained on station in Greece until the Armistice of Cassibile on 8 September 1943, when it was forcibly disbanded by the Germans.

== History ==
It was formed on 9 November 1940 out of the 11th Army Corps, then based in Italian-occupied Albania and engaged in operations against Greece alongside the 9th Army. Its engagement against the Greeks lasted until the fall of Greece in April 1941.

=== Occupation of Greece ===
Thereafter, the Eleventh Army assumed duties of occupation in Greece, headquartered in Athens. Its command also doubled as the Higher Armed Forces Command Greece (Comando Superiore Forze Armate Grecia, abbrev. C.S. FF. AA. Grecia), with responsibility over mainland Greece (apart from the German and Bulgarian zones in northern Greece and the German zone in eastern and southern Attica), as well as the island of Euboea, the Northern Sporades and Skyros, and Kythera. The remainder of the Ionian Islands came under the Higher Armed Forces Command Albania (Ninth Army), while the Italian Dodecanese, the Italian-occupied Lasithi Prefecture on Crete and the bulk of the Cyclades came under the Higher Armed Forces Command of the Italian Islands of the Aegean at Rhodes. Apart from the units of the Eleventh Army, the Higher Armed Forces Command Greece also included the Air Force Command Greece (Comando Aeronautica Grecia), and the Western Greece Naval Military Command (Comando Militare Marittimo della Grecia Occidentale) at Patras.

In April 1943, an assessment of the combat readiness of the Eleventh Army's eight remaining divisions in terms of armament and means of transport found only one—the 11th Infantry Division Brennero—as "complete", with three more "effective" (over 70% of pack animals and 70% to 90% of vehicles from the table of organization and equipment) and the rest "incomplete" (with figures of completeness around 60%). In a similar evaluation of their completeness in personnel a fortnight later, only Brennero and the 33rd Infantry Division Acqui were classed as "complete", with the remainder as "effective". The situation remained largely the same during another review of their combat readiness in June.

It was forcibly disbanded by the German Army in September 1943, after the Italian capitulation.

== Orders of battle ==
=== August 1941 ===
Order of battle of the Eleventh Army in August 1941, coloured by Army Corps. The distribution of units would remain essentially unchanged for the duration of the Italian occupation, except for the departure of the 3rd Julia Alpine Division in 1942 and 51st Siena Division's transfer to Crete.

During the first months of its occupation of Greece, Eleventh Army comprised the following units:

- III Army Corps (Volos), Generale di divisione Mario Arisio
  - 11th Brennero Infantry Division (Athens)
  - 24th Pinerolo Infantry Division (Trikala)
  - 36th Forlì Infantry Division (Larissa)
- VIII Army Corps (Xylokastro), Generale di Corpo d'Armata Giuseppe Pafundi
  - 29th Piemonte Infantry Division (Patras)
  - 51st Siena Infantry Division (Nafplion), earmarked for transfer to Crete
  - 59th Cagliari Infantry Division (Tripoli)
  - 3rd Julia Alpine Division (Metsovo), in effect under direct operational control of the Higher Armed Forces Command Greece as general reserve, departed for Italy in March 1942
- XXVI Army Corps (Ioannina), Generale di divisione Guido Della Bona
  - 33rd Acqui Infantry Division (Corfu)
  - 37th Modena Infantry Division (Ioannina)
  - 56th Casale Infantry Division (Agrinion)

=== Spring 1943 ===
In spring 1943, Eleventh Army comprised the following units:

- III Army Corps (Volos)
  - 24th Pinerolo Infantry Division (Trikala)
  - 36th Forlì Infantry Division (Larissa)
- VIII Army Corps (Xylokastro)
  - 29th Piemonte Infantry Division (Patras)
  - 59th Cagliari Infantry Division (Tripoli)
- XXVI Army Corps (Ioannina)
  - 37th Modena Infantry Division (Ioannina)
  - 56th Casale Infantry Division (Agrinion)
- 11th Brennero Infantry Division (Athens), as general reserve under direct command of Eleventh Army
- 33rd Acqui Infantry Division (Corfu), as garrison of the Ionian Islands

== Commanders ==
- Generale di Corpo d'Armata Sebastiano Visconti Prasca (1940)
- Generale d'Armata Carlo Geloso (1940–1943)
- Generale d'Armata Carlo Vecchiarelli (1943)

== Sources ==
- Bregantin, Lisa (2010). L'occupazione dimenticata. Gli italiani in Grecia 1941-1943 [The Forgotten Occupation. The Italians in Greece 1941–1943] (PhD thesis) (in Italian). Università Ca’ Foscari di Venezia. Archived from the original on 2019-01-17.
