= Smyrna Division =

Infantry division of the Hellenic Army

The Smyrna Division (Greek: Μεραρχία Σμύρνης) was an infantry division of the Hellenic Army, active in 1919–1920 during the Asia Minor Campaign.

Following the Greek landing at Smyrna on 2 May 1919, and the establishment of an occupation zone in Ionia, the Smyrna Division began formation on 17 June 1919. Its core was provided by the 8th Cretan Regiment and the newly raised 27th Infantry Regiment, formed from the 1st and 2nd Security Battalions of Thessaloniki. The division's third regiment, the 28th Infantry Regiment, was being formed in Thessaloniki, and arrived at Smyrna on 7 July, along with the divisional artillery and support services. The first commander was Colonel Alexandros Mazarakis-Ainian.

In November 1919, the 8th Cretan Regiment was replaced by the newly raised 30th Infantry Regiment. At about the same time, the Smyrna Division became part of the newly formed Smyrna Army Corps under Lt. General Dimitrios Ioannou, subordinate to the Army of Asia Minor. In 1920, the division participated in the Greek summer offensive, captured Balıkesir and took part in the advance towards Bursa. From there the division were recalled to be used in a landing operation in support of the occupation of Eastern Thrace: the division was ferried from Asia and landed at Ereğli and Rodosto, and thence advanced north. After overcoming Turkish resistance at Lule Burgas, Babaeski and Çorlu and capturing the local Turkish commander, Cafer Tayyar, the division reached Adrianople. Returning to Asia, the Smyrna Division occupied positions around Bursa, and launched a series of raids against Turkish territory.

Following the Venizelist defeat in the November 1920 elections, the division lost its commander, Mazarakis, who resigned. Shortly after, it was renamed to 10th Infantry Division by the new royalist government.

== Sources ==
- Neroutsos, Konstantinos (1957). Η εκστρατεία εις την Μικράν Ασίαν 1919-1922. Ο Ελληνικός Στρατός εις την Σμύρνην (Μάιος 1919-Μάιος 1920) (in Greek). Athens: Hellenic Army History Directorate.
- Neroutsos, Konstantinos (1957). Η εκστρατεία εις την Μικράν Ασίαν 1919-1922. Επιχειρήσεις Φιλαδελφείας-Προύσης-Ουσάκ (Ιούνιος-Νοέμβριος 1920) (in Greek). Athens: Hellenic Army History Directorate.
- Theotikos, Lazaros (1969). Επιχειρήσεις Εις Θράκην (1919-1923) (in Greek). Athens: Hellenic Army History Directorate.
- Πολεμική Ιστορία του Ελληνικού Έθνους: Περίοδος Παγκοσμίου Πολέμου - Εκστρατεία Μικράς Ασίας [Military History of the Greek Nation: Period of the World War - Asia Minor Campaign] (in Greek). Athens: Στρατιωτική Εγκυκλοπαίδεια. c. 1930.
