= XXVI Army Corps (Italy) =

Italian infantry corps

The XXVI Army Corps (Italian: XXVI Corpo d'Armata) was an infantry corps of the Royal Italian Army during World War I, the Italian invasion of Albania, and the Greco-Italian War and the subsequent Italian occupation of Greece during World War II.

== History ==
The XXV Corps was first established in Castelfranco Veneto on 23 May 1916, until its disbandment on 10 January 1920.

In March 1939, in preparation for the Italian invasion of Albania, the Tirana Overseas Expeditionary Corps (Corpo di Spedizione Oltre Mare Tirana, O.M.T.) was formed, comprising the 154th Infantry Division "Murge", four Bersaglieri regiments and a Grenadier regiment. The invasion took place on 7 April, and after weak resistance, by 15 April the entire country was occupied and annexed to Italy. On the same day, the corps was renamed the Albania Army Corps Command (Comando Corpo d'Armata Albania), comprising the 3rd Alpine Division "Julia", 7th Infantry Division "Lupi di Toscana", 19th Infantry Division "Venezia", and 131st Armored Division "Centauro". On 23 July, a Higher Forces Command Albania (Comando Superiore Truppe Albania) with a status of a field army was established as a higher instance, but on 1 December 1939 the two commands were merged as the Higher Forces Command Albania (XXVI Army Corps).

On 24 October 1940, in preparation for the Italian invasion of Greece on the 28th, the Higher Forces Command Albania—which soon after became the 11th Army—was divided into the XXVI Corps and the newly created Army Corps of the Ciamuria. The XXVI Army Corps occupied the eastern (left) half of the Italian front with Greece, between the Prespa Lakes and Mount Gobellit. It comprised the 49th Infantry Division "Parma", 29th Infantry Division "Piemonte", 19th Infantry Division "Venezia", and 53rd Infantry Division "Arezzo". The Corps' role during the early days of the Italian offensive was to mount diversionary attacks on the Greek front, but from 1 November the Greek troops of the Western Macedonia Army Section (TSDM) launched a counteroffensive, beginning an advance into Albania that was only halted at the Lake Ohrid–Tepeleni line. The front remained relatively stable thereafter, despite the attempt of the Italian Spring Offensive in March 1941 to achieve a breakthrough. Following the German invasion of Greece on 6 April, on 10 April the Italian forces in the Albanian front began their own advance against the retreating Greeks, arriving at the old Greco-Albanian border on 23 April, the day of the capitulation of the Greek army to the Germans.

On 4 May, the corps was redesignated as the Alpine Army Corps Command (XXVI) (Comando Corpo d'Armata Alpino (XXVI)) with the 2nd Alpine Division "Tridentina" and 5th Alpine Division "Pusteria", until its dissolution on 15 June.

XXVI Corps was reconstituted on 1 August 1941, inheriting the units of the disbanded XXV Corps, the divisions 33rd Infantry Division "Acqui", 37th Infantry Division "Modena", 3rd Alpine Division "Julia", and 5th Alpine Division "Pusteria". Based at Ioannina, it assumed occupation duties in western Greece (Epirus and the Ionian Islands), in a coastal defence and anti-partisan role. In 1942, Julia was repatriated, but in spring 1943, it received operational control over the 1st German Mountain Division. The corps remained in place until the Italian armistice of September 1943, when it was disbanded.

== Commanders ==
Higher Forces Command Albania/XXVI Corps (1939–1940)

- Generale di corpo d'armata Alfredo Guzzoni (1939.03 – 1939.12.01)
- Generale di corpo d'armata Carlo Geloso (1939.12.01 – 1940.06.05)
- Generale di corpo d'armata Sebastiano Visconti Prasca (1940.06.05 – 1940.11.09)

XXVI Corps/XXVI Alpine Corps (1940–1943)

- Generale di corpo d'armata Gabriele Nasci (1940.10.31 – 1941.05.04)
- Generale di divisione Ugo Santovito (interim)
- Generale di divisione Alessandro Gloria (interim)
- Generale di corpo d'armata Guido Della Bona (1941.08.01 – 1943.09.08)
