= 13th Infantry Division (Greece) =

13th Infantry Division XIII Μεραρχία Πεζικού (XIII ΜΠ)
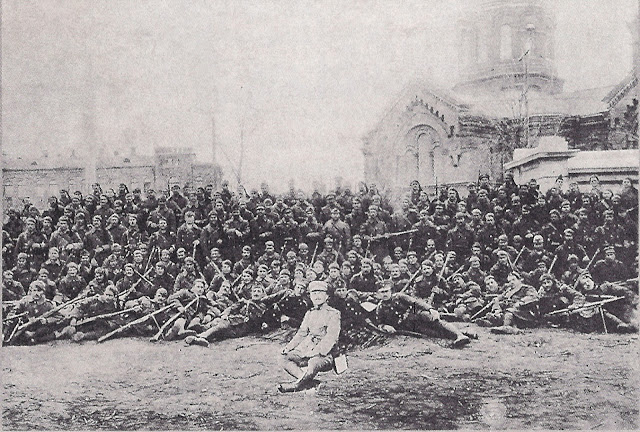
- Men of the Division's 5/42 Evzone Regiment in Odessa, 1919
- Active: 1913–1916; 1918–1922; 1939–1941
- Country: Kingdom of Greece
- Branch: Hellenic Army
- Type: Infantry
- Size: Division
- Engagements: World War I, Allied intervention in Southern Russia, Greco-Turkish War (1919–1922), Greco-Italian War

The 13th Infantry Division (Greek: XIII Μεραρχία Πεζικού, XIII ΜΠ; XIII Merarchia Pezikou, XIII MP) was an infantry division of the Hellenic Army.

The 13th Infantry Division was established in December 1913, during the reorganization of the Hellenic Army that followed the Balkan Wars. Its headquarters was at Chalkis in central Greece, comprising the 2nd and 3rd infantry regiments, as well as the 5/42 Evzone Regiment. The division formed part of the Athens-based I Army Corps. As a result of the National Schism, the division was disbanded in 1916.

As part of the reconstituted I Corps, the division fought in the Strymon River sector of the Macedonian front during the final stages of World War I, in the summer of 1918. In early 1919, the division formed part of the Greek expeditionary force sent to support the Allied intervention in Southern Russia. After being withdrawn from Russia, in June 1919 the division was sent along with the rest of I Corps to take up occupation duties in the Smyrna Zone. The division was headquartered at Manisa. It participated in all subsequent operations of the Asia Minor Campaign in 1920–1922.

In the interwar period, due to the reduction in the size of the army, the division was disbanded, until the December 1939 changes to the mobilization plan, which re-established the 13th Division at Mytilene, in the eastern Aegean island of Lesbos, under the V Army Corps. During the Greco-Italian War of 1940–41, the 13th Division fought as part of the III Army Corps and the Western Macedonia Army Section. With the capitulation of the Greek army following the German invasion of Greece in April 1941, the division was disbanded.

Major General Allan Adair of the British Army commanded and reformed the division 1945-46.

== Sources ==
- Η ιστορία του Πεζικού (Στρατιωτικός Κανονισμός 900-21) [History of the Infantry (Military Regulation 900-21)] (PDF) (in Greek). Athens: Hellenic Army Infantry Directorate/3a. 2014.
