= 6th Infantry Division (Greece) =

6th Infantry Division VI Μεραρχία Πεζικού (VI ΜΠ)
- Flag and Emblem of the 6th Infantry Division
- Active: 1912–1941, 1946–2003
- Country: Greece
- Branch: Hellenic Army
- Type: Infantry Division
- Garrison/HQ: Kilkis, Macedonia
- Engagements: First Balkan War, Second Balkan War, World War I, Greco-Turkish War (1919–1922), Greco-Italian War, Greek Civil War

The 6th Infantry Division (Greek: VI Μεραρχία Πεζικού, VI ΜΠ, romanized: VI Merarchia Pezikou, VI MP) was an infantry division of the Hellenic Army.

== History ==
Founded during the mobilization for the First Balkan War. In autumn 1912 it served under Colonel Konstantinos Miliotis-Komninos during the Balkan Wars. It would be disbanded during the National Schism. In autumn 1916, the Serres Division (Μεραρχία Σερρών) was formed by the Provisional Government of National Defence as its first major military formation, and was sent to the Macedonian front. In December 1920, the division was renamed to the 6th Infantry Division. The division fought in the Asia Minor Campaign and the Greco-Italian War. It was dismantled after the German invasion of Greece in 1941. In was reformed in 1946 from the 25th, 26th and 27th Brigades as part of the III Army Corps. In the period 1960–1998 the division came under the II Army Corps. Initially based at Kavala, from 1952 until its disbandment in 2003 it was based at Kilkis
