= I Army Corps (Greece) =

Coordinates: 40°17′30″N 21°46′54.4″E

- Α' Σώμα Στρατού
- Active: 1913–1941, 1946–2013
- Country: Greece
- Branch: Hellenic Army
- Garrison/HQ: Kozani
- Motto: Molon labe
- Engagements: Macedonian front, Allied intervention in Ukraine, Asia Minor Campaign, Greco-Italian War, Greek Civil War, Korean War

Commanders
- Notable commanders: Konstantinos Kallaris, Leonidas Paraskevopoulos, Thrasyvoulos Tsakalotos

The I Army Corps (Greek: Α' Σώμα Στρατού, abbr. Α' ΣΣ) was an army corps of the Hellenic Army, founded in December 1913. Originally based in Athens and covering southern Greece, since 1962 it was responsible for covering Greece's northwestern borders (Epirus and Western and Central Macedonia). It was disbanded in 2013.

== History ==
Following the Balkan Wars of 1912–13, the Hellenic Army began a major reorganization and expansion. For the first time, army corps-level formations were established on a permanent basis. Six corps were provisionally envisioned in August 1913. On 28 November 1913 (O.S.), by Royal Decree the Athens Army Corps was reorganized as a "model" formation. Alongside its constituent units, it was to serve as a training formation for the entire Army. For this purpose, it also included all military schools and academies, and was to be commanded by the head of the French military mission to Greece and extensively staffed by French officers of the mission. The new peacetime establishment was further modified and formalized by Royal Decree on 23 December 1913 (O.S.), and the I Army Corps was officially established on that date, comprising three infantry divisions (1st Infantry Division at Larissa, 2nd Infantry Division at Athens, and the newly raised 13th Infantry Division at Chalkis), a cavalry regiment, an artillery regiment, an engineers regiment and other attendant services. The first Corps commander was Lt. General Konstantinos Kallaris, who had commanded the 2nd Division during the Balkan Wars. I Corps remained loyal to the royal government during National Schism, and was demobilized after the Noemvriana.

=== World War I ===
After Greece's entry in World War I in June 1917, the Corps was reformed and participated in the Macedonian front operations in 1917–1918, fighting against the Bulgarians on the Struma front in eastern Macedonia. It subsequently dispatched the major part of its force (2nd and 13th Divisions under Major Gen. Konstantinos Nider) to the Crimea and Ukraine, as part of the unsuccessful Southern Russia intervention.

1st Division was tasked with the occupation of Smyrna and the Erythrae peninsula, and then formed part of the Army of Asia Minor along with the rest of I Corps, evacuated from Russia in late 1919. I Corps then participated in the battles of the Asia Minor Campaign until the final Greek defeat and evacuation in August–September 1922.

=== Interwar ===
During the Interwar years, I Corps, still at Athens, comprised the 2nd Infantry Division (Athens), 3rd Infantry Division (Patras), and 4th Infantry Division (Nauplia). The corps was a mainly reserve formation, covering southern Greece while the majority of the Greek army was concentrated in Macedonia and Thrace against Bulgaria.

=== World War II ===
Following the outbreak of the Greco-Italian War in October 1940, the corps was mobilized and sent to the Albanian front under its commander, Lt. Gen. Panagiotis Demestichas. The Corps was demobilized and disbanded in April 1941, following the Battle of Greece.

=== Cold War ===
I Corps was re-established on 16 May 1946 as part of the post-war reconstruction of the Greek armed forces, and comprised the 2nd Infantry Division, the 51st and 61st Brigades, and later the 81st Military Region (Corinth), the 82nd Mil. Region (Athens) and the Lamia Military Command. With the outbreak of the Greek Civil War, the corps was engaged in combat against the Communist-led Democratic Army of Greece. Under the command of Lt. Gen. Thrasyvoulos Tsakalotos, it played a major role in clearing southern Greece of the guerrillas and then in the final defeat of the Communists in the battles of Grammos and Vitsi in 1948–1949.

Following the end of the civil war, I Corps, since 1951 based at Trikala, was also responsible for the recruitment of the Greek Expeditionary Force in Korea. In 1962, the corps headquarters was moved to Kozani, where it remained until its disbandment.

=== 21st century ===
Following a wide-ranging defence review that decided upon a new force structure for the Greek armed forces, in April 2013 KYSEA decided the disbandment of I Army Corps. From its component units, 24th Armored Brigade came under 2nd Mechanized Infantry Division, the 15th Infantry Brigade was reduced to regimental level, the 8th Infantry Division was reduced to a brigade—while retaining its former name—and along with the 9th Infantry Brigade came under III Army Corps.

==== Structure (2008) ====
- I Army Corps (Α' Σώμα Στρατού), headquartered at Kozani
  - 8th Infantry Division (VIII ΜΠ), based at Ioannina, Epirus organised in
    - HQ Company (ΛΣ/VIII ΜΠ)
    - 3/40 Evzone Regiment, "Koutsi" (3/40ο ΣΕ «Κούτσι»)
    - 8th Armored Cavalry Battalion (8η ΕΑΝ), based at Ioannina, Epirus
    - 583rd Infantry Battalion (583 ΤΠ)
    - 625th Infantry Battalion (625 ΤΠ ΚΕΝ – ΕΚΕ)
    - 628th Infantry Battalion (628 ΤΠ)
    - 708th Engineer Battalion (708ο ΤΜΧ)
  - 9th Infantry Brigade (9η ΤΑΞΠΖ), based at Florina, West Macedonia
  - 15th Infantry Brigade (15η ΤΑΞΠΖ), based at Kastoria, West Macedonia
  - 24th Armored Brigade, "1st Cavalry Regiment Florina" (XXIV ΤΘΤ «1ο Σύνταγμα Ιππικού ΦΛΩΡΙΝΑ»), based at Litochoro, Central Macedonia
  - 1st Armored Cavalry Battalion (A EAN), based at Amyntaio, West Macedonia
  - Corps Engineer Command and units (ΔΜΧ/Α'ΣΣ)
  - 586th Recruits Training Center (586 KEN), based at Grevena, West Macedonia
  - 488th Signal Battalion (488ο ΤΔΒ)
  - Corps HQ Battalion

== Emblem ==
The motto at the top of the emblem, Μολών Λαβέ, means "Come and take them", and was uttered by the Spartan King Leonidas I, just prior to the Battle of Thermopylae, as a response to the Persian King Xerxes I's demand for the surrender of the Spartans' arms.
