= 9th Infantry Brigade (Greece) =

9th Motorized Infantry Brigade "Adrianople"
- 9η Μηχανοποιημένη Ταξιαρχία Πεζικού "Αδριανούπολη"
- Camp flag of the 9th Infantry Brigade
- Active: 1913–1941; 1946–today
- Country: Greece
- Branch: Hellenic Army
- Type: Motorized infantry
- Size: Brigade
- Part of: III Army Corps
- Garrison/HQ: Kozani, Macedonia
- Mottos: "Either live well or die well" Η καλώς ζην ή καλώς τεθνηκέναι I kalos zin i kalos tethnikene
- Engagements: World War I: Macedonian front; Greco-Turkish War (1919–1922); World War II: Greco-Italian War; Battle of Greece; Greek Civil War

The 9th Motorized Infantry Brigade (Greek: 9η Μηχανοποιημένη Ταξιαρχία Πεζικού «Αδριανούπολη», 9η Μ/Π ΤΑΞΠΖ) is a motorized infantry brigade of the Hellenic Army. Headquartered in Kozani and subordinated to the III Army Corps, it was formed from the former 9th Infantry Division (ΙΧ Μεραρχία Πεζικού) on 1 April 1998.

In 2024 the unit's commander was Brigadier General Kosmas Kalmanidis.

== Structure ==
- Brigade Headquarters Company (ΛΣ/9ης ΤΑΞ ΠΖ) at Kozani.
- 9th Signals Company (9ος ΛΔΒ)
- 9th Engineer Company (9ος ΛΜΧ)
- 9th Support Battalion (9ο ΤΥΠ)
- 523rd Mechanized Infantry Battalion (523 M/Κ ΤΠ) at Mavrodendri.
- 586th Motorized Infantry Battalion (586 Μ/Π ΤΠ) at Grevena.
- 106th Self-Propelled Medium Artillery Battalion (106η Α/Κ ΜΜΠ) at Amyntaio.
- 1st Infantry Regiment Tactical Command (ΤΔ/1ου ΣΠ) at Florina.
- 15th Infantry Regiment Tactical Command (ΤΔ/15ου ΣΠ) at Kastoria.
