= NATO Rapid Deployable Corps – Greece =

Multi-national corps headquarters of the Hellenic Army and NATO

Supreme Military Command of Epirus and Macedonia NATO Rapid Deployable Corps – Greece
- Ανωτάτη Στρατιωτική Διοίκηση Ηπείρου και Μακεδονίας
- Emblem of the NATO Rapid Deploment Corps
- Active: 1913–1917; 1920–1941; 1946–present
- Country: Greece
- Allegiance: (Greece) Provisional Government of National Defence (1916-1917)
- Branch: Hellenic Army
- Size: Army Corps
- Part of: Hellenic Army General Staff
- Location: Thessaloniki, Central Macedonia
- Motto: ου φεισόμεθα της ζωής ημών - "We will not spare our lives" (attr. to Constantine XI Palaiologos)
- Engagements: World War I: Macedonian front; Greco-Turkish War (1919–1922): Occupation of Smyrna; World War II: Greco-Italian War; Battle of Greece; Greek Civil War

Commanders
- Current commander: Lt General Grigorios Mpountiliakis

The Supreme Military Command of Epirus and Macedonia / NATO Rapid Deployable Corps – Greece, abbreviated NRDC-GR (Greek: ΑΣΔΗΜ), is an operational headquarters of the Hellenic Army, intended for the direction of international operations undertaken by the European Union and NATO. The HQ was originally going to replace the III Army Corps of the Hellenic Army altogether, taking control of its rapid response units, but this was changed in 2009, so that the two HQs essentially co-exist as a joint formation, each controlling different units of the old Army Corps. Both HQs are based in the city of Thessaloniki since 1946.

== Mission ==
NDC-GR will provide the HQ capabilities for sustainment and rotation for prolonged operations. In order to operate throughout the entire spectrum of NATO missions which may range from high to low intensity, an FLR(L) HQ must be able to fulfill the two broad functions of sustaining/rotating an HRF(L) HQ or as an AJFCC.

NDC-GR HQ will be declared to NATO and will be placed under OPCOM to SACEUR once the North Atlantic Council has agreed upon a mission. The HQ can be deployed as an FLR (L) HQ Alliance-wide and beyond. It will be able to operate throughout the entire mission spectrum, ranging from PSO up to high intensity combat operations in any physical environment.

== History ==
III Army Corps was founded after the Balkan Wars, on 16 August 1913 (O.S.), provisionally based at Ioannina and comprising the 2nd Infantry Division at Missolonghi, the 3rd Infantry Division at Korytsa, and the 9th Infantry Division at Ioannina.

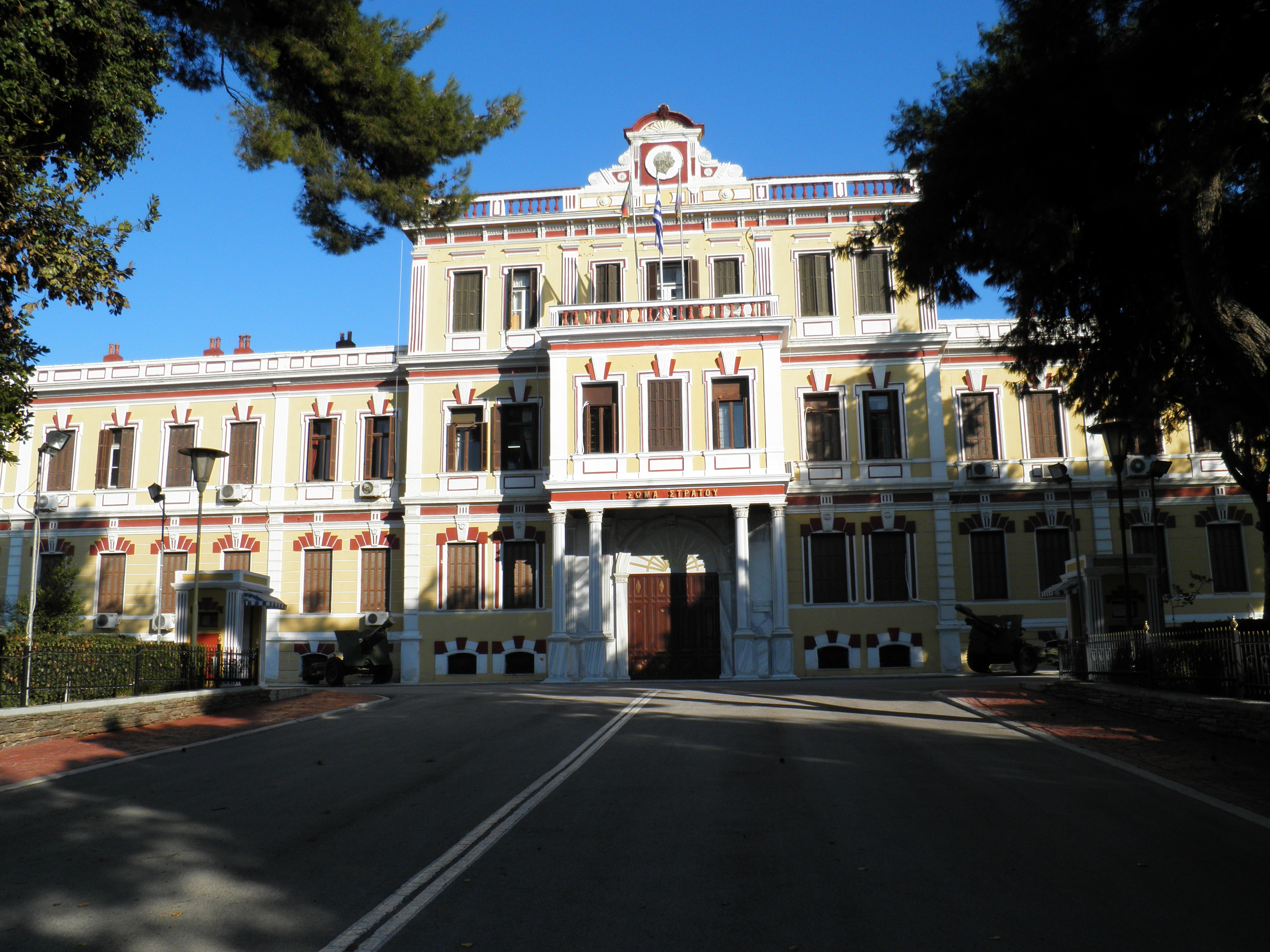
Headquarters in Thessaloniki

A new royal decree on 23 December 1913 (O.S.) finalized the peace-time structure of the Hellenic Army, and III Corps was moved to its new base at Thessaloniki, comprising the 10th Infantry Division at Veroia, 11th Infantry Division at Thessaloniki, and 12th Infantry Division at Kozani, as well as the necessary corps units (5th Field Artillery Regiment, III Sappers Regiment, III Nursing Regiment and III Transport battalion). III Corps remained at Thessaloniki until October 1916, when the establishment of the pro-entente Provisional Government of National Defence in the city finalized the National Schism. The entente powers demanded and secured the withdrawal of the loyalist formations to Thessaly, where III Corps was based in Tsaritsaina, and after the Noemvriana even further south to the Peloponnese. The corps remained there until June 1917, when Greece, reunified under Eleftherios Venizelos, formally entered World War I on the side of the entente. With the reorganization of the army for operations on the Macedonian front, III Corps was disbanded.

In December 1919, following the occupation of Smyrna, the Smyrna Army Corps (Σώμα Στρατού Σμύρνης) was established, comprising the newly raised Smyrna Division and the Archipelago Division, to which was added in January 1920 the 12th Infantry Division. After the Venizelist electoral defeat in November 1920, the corps was renamed "III Army Corps", and continued to participate in the Asia Minor Campaign under this name. In the interwar period, the corps returned to Thessaloniki. It participated in the Greco-Italian War and capitulated with the rest of the Hellenic Army after the German invasion of Greece in April 1941.

After liberation, corps-level formations began again to be raised in March 1946, when the hitherto superior military commands were converted to army corps: on 16 May 1946, the Central Macedonia Superior Military Command became III Army Corps, once more based at Thessaloniki, with 11th Infantry Division (31st, 32nd, 33rd brigades, 592nd Inf. Battalion, 616th National Guard Battalion) and 10th Infantry Division (35th, 36th, 37th brigades, 603rd Inf. Battalion, 615th National Guard Battalion) at Thessaloniki and 7th Infantry Division (25th, 26th, 27th brigades) at Kavala. It participated in the ongoing Greek Civil War (1946–49), with a zone of responsibility covering most of northern Greece, from the Kaimakchalan—Mount Vermion—Mount Olympus line in the west to the border with Turkey in the east.

With the reorganization of the army after the end of the civil war, the III Corps, still headquartered at Thessaloniki, assumed responsibility for the defence of northeastern Greece east of the Axios River. To this end, it comprised 6th Infantry Division at Kilkis, 10th Infantry Division at Serres, 11th Infantry Division at Kavala and 12th Infantry Division at Alexandroupoli. The 6th Infantry Division was transferred to II Army Corps in 1960, but a new 16th Infantry Division was formed in 1975. In the next year, the establishment of IV Army Corps, which took over responsibility for Western Thrace and the Turkish border, III Corps was limited to 10th Division (Serres) and 11th Division (Kavala), with the 3rd Support Brigade in Thessaloniki.

On 1 January 1998, a wide-ranging reorganization of the army took place, and III Corps assumed the zone of II Corps as well, now comprising 6th Infantry Division (Kilkis), 10th Infantry Division (Serres), 11th Infantry Division (Kavala), 4th Infantry Brigade (Greece) (Axioupolis), 3rd Support Brigade (Thessaloniki) and the 5/42 Evzone Regiment (Skydra).

On 30 June 2004, the corps was dissolved as a national territorial formation and was reduced to a headquarters for the NATO Deployable Corps – Greece (NDC-GR), with a parallel secondary mission as garrison of Thessaloniki. The decision to dissolve III Corps as a territorial formation was gradually reversed: in 2006 it was re-established as a national formation under First Army in tandem with its role as NDC-GR, while in 2009 it re-acquired a separate area of responsibility with the allocation of 10th Infantry Brigade at Serres.

In 2013, after another wide-ranging reorganization, III Corps assumed control over 8th Infantry Division at Ioannina (despite its name a brigade-level formation) and 9th Infantry Brigade (Greece) at Kozani, while the 10th and 15th infantry brigades were reduced to regimental level.

In 2025, it was renamed Supreme Military Command of Epirus and Macedonia, with its AOR ranging from the Diapontian Islands to Eastern Macedonia.

== Structure ==
III Army Corps locations

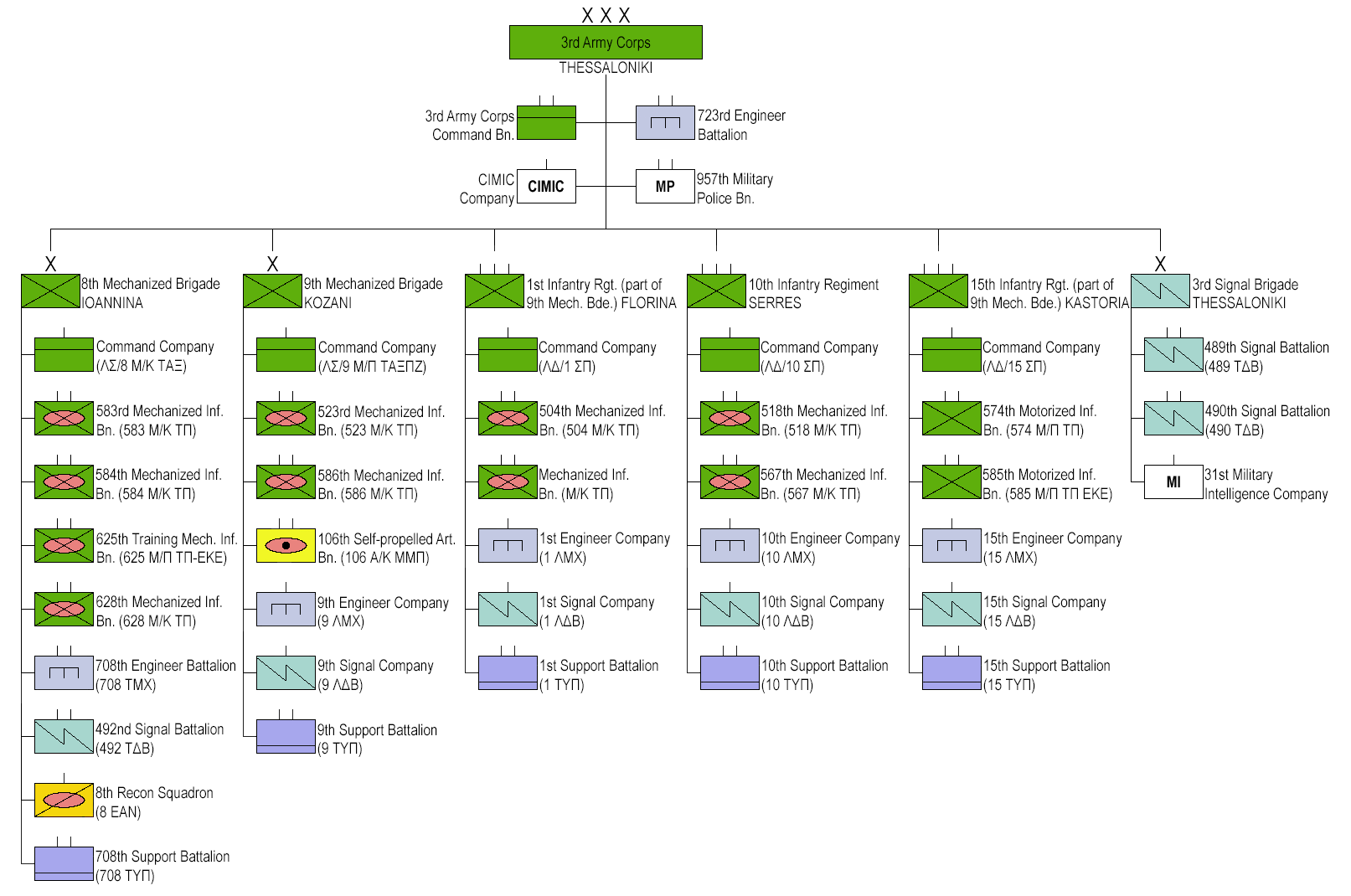
3rd Army Corps organization 2025

- Supreme Military Command of Epirus and Macedonia/NRDC - Greece, in Thessaloniki (Central Macedonia)
  - Supreme Military Command of Epirus and Macedonia HQ Battalion
  - 8th Mechanized Brigade, in Ioannina, (Epirus)
  - 9th Mechanized Brigade, in Kozani (Western Macedonia)
    - 1st Infantry Regiment, in Florina, (Western Macedonia)
    - 15th Infantry Regiment, in Kastoria, (Western Macedonia)
  - 10th Infantry Regiment, in Serres, (Central Macedonia)
  - 3rd Signals Brigade
    - 489th Signals Battalion
    - 490th Signals Battalion
    - 31st Military Intelligence Company
  - 723rd Engineer Battalion
  - 957th Military Police Battalion
  - CIMIC Company
