= Battle of Greece order of battle =

World War II order of battle

This is the order of battle of the German, Greek and British Commonwealth units on 5 April 1941, prior to the German invasion of Greece and Yugoslavia ("Operation Marita"). The German invasion and conquest of mainland Greece is known as the "Battle of Greece".

== German forces ==
The German forces were grouped under Generalfeldmarschall Wilhelm List's 12th Army, which comprised:

- 1st Panzer Group (Generaloberst Paul Ludwig Ewald von Kleist), deployed against central Yugoslavia (Serbia)
- XL Panzer Corps (Generalleutnant Georg Stumme), deployed against southern Yugoslavia (Vardar Macedonia)
  - 9th Panzer Division
  - 73rd Infantry Division
  - LSSAH Motorized Regiment
- XVIII Mountain Corps (General der Infanterie Franz Böhme), deployed against the Greek forces along the Metaxas Line
  - 2nd Panzer Division
  - 5th Mountain Division
  - 6th Mountain Division
  - 72nd Infantry Division
  - Reinforced 125th Infantry Division
- XXX Army Corps (General der Artillerie Otto Hartmann)
  - 50th Infantry Division
  - 164th Infantry Division
- L Army Corps (General der Kavallerie Georg Lindemann), as reserve in Romania
- 16th Panzer Division, on the Bulgarian–Turkish border

The 1st Panzer Group did not participate in any significant way in the conquest of Greece. After the unexpected coup d'état in Yugoslavia on 27 March, the objective of the Panzer Group was changed to invading Yugoslavia and capturing Zagreb. As such, its command was handed over to General Maximilian von Weichs' 2nd Army, which was invading Yugoslavia from the north.

== Greek forces ==
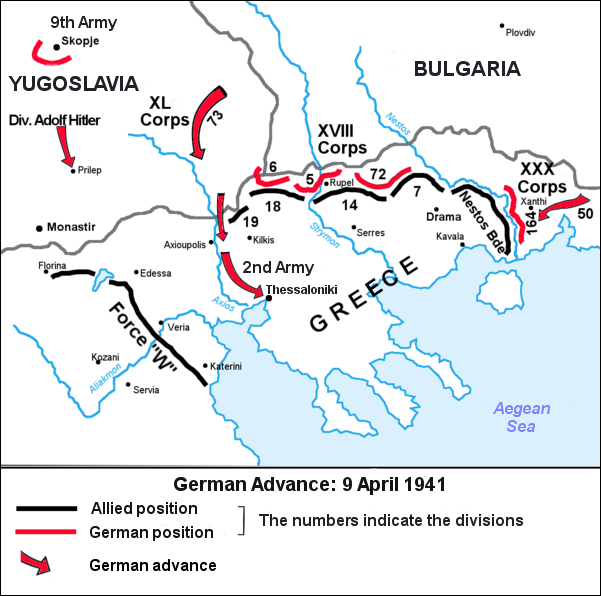
The disposition of the Allied forces and the German axes of attack

The Greek Army had been fighting against the Italians since 28 October 1940, and the bulk of its forces (15+ divisions) was still committed against the Italian Army and within Albania. The forces available to face the expected German attack in Macedonia were mostly newly formed divisions manned with reservists, lacking heavy weapons and equipment. At the same time, the Greek GHQ did not agree with the British as to the deployment of its forces, being unwilling to abandon all of northern Greece in favour of the shorter Vermion Mountains–Haliacmon River line favoured by the British. Consequently, the Greek forces in Macedonia were divided in two major groupings, which fought separate battles.

The Eastern Macedonia Army Section (Τμήμα Στρατιάς Ανατολικής Μακεδονίας, ΤΣΑΜ) under Lt. Gen. Konstantinos Bakopoulos covered the pre-war fortifications of the Metaxas Line, between Mount Beles and the Nestos river.

- 7th Infantry Division (Maj. Gen. Christos Zoiopoulos)
  - 26th Infantry Regiment
  - 71st Infantry Regiment
  - 92nd Infantry Regiment
- 14th Infantry Division (Maj. Gen. Konstantinos Papakonstantinou)
- 18th Infantry Division (Maj. Gen. Leonidas Stergiopoulos)
- 19th Mechanized Division (Maj. Gen. Nikolaos Lioumbas) (Note: Although officially a "mechanized" (μηχανοκίνητη) unit, the division was mostly truck-borne and is hence usually termed "motorized" in English literature, such as Blau (1986))
  - 191st Mechanized Regiment
  - 192nd Mechanized Regiment
  - 193rd Mechanized Regiment
- Nestos Brigade (Col. Anastasios Kalis)
- Krousia Detachment
- Evros Brigade (Maj. Gen. Ioannis Zisis), detached as a covering force for Western Thrace
- 21 fortresses of the Meraxas Line

The Central Macedonia Army Section (Τμήμα Στρατιάς Κεντρικής Μακεδονίας, ΤΣΚΜ) under Lt. Gen. Ioannis Kotoulas was assigned to W Force in holding the Vermion Mountains–Haliacmon line:

- 12th Infantry Division (Col. G. Karambatos)
  - 35th Infantry Regiment
  - 80th Infantry Regiment
  - Dodecanese Regiment
  - X Frontier Sector
  - 20th Mountain Artillery Regiment
- 20th Infantry Division (Maj. Gen. Christos Karassos)
  - 82nd Infantry Regiment
  - 84th Infantry Regiment
  - 86th Infantry Regiment
  - 87th Infantry Regiment

In total, the Greek forces facing the Germans numbered 65,110 men, only about half of whom were combat-worthy.

== Commonwealth forces ==
The Commonwealth forces were constituted as W Force, named after its commander, Lieutenant General Sir Henry Maitland Wilson:

- Australian Imperial Force (Lt. Gen. Sir Thomas Blamey)
  - 6th Australian Division (Major General. Sir Iven Mackay)
    - 16th Australian Infantry Brigade (Brig. Arthur Allen)
    - 17th Australian Infantry Brigade (Brig. Stanley Savige)
    - 19th Australian Infantry Brigade (Brig. George Vasey)
- 2nd New Zealand Division (Maj. Gen. Bernard Freyberg)
  - 4th Infantry Brigade (Brigadier. Edward Puttick)
    - 18th Battalion
    - 19th Battalion
    - 20th Battalion
  - 5th Infantry Brigade (Brig. James Hargest)
    - 21st Battalion
    - 22nd Battalion
    - 23rd Battalion
    - Māori Battalion
  - 6th Infantry Brigade (Brig. Harold Barrowclough)
  - Divisional Cavalry Regiment ( Marmon-Herrington armoured cars)
  - 7th Anti-Tank Regiment (2-pounder anti-tank guns))
- British 1st Armoured Brigade (Brig. Harold Vincent Spencer Charrington)
  - 1st (The King's) Dragoon Guards (armoured car regiment)
  - 4th (The Queen's Own) Hussars (light tanks)
  - 3rd Royal Tank Regiment (Cruiser Mk II, Cruiser Mk III tanks)
  - 1st Battalion, The Rangers (motor battalion)
  - 2nd Regiment, Royal Horse Artillery
  - 102nd (Northumberland Hussars) Anti-Tank Regiment, Royal Artillery ( 2-pounder (40 mm) anti-tank guns)
  - 52 (East Lancashire) Light Anti-Aircraft Regiment, Royal Artillery
- 7th Medium Regiment, Royal Artillery (4.5 inch medium field guns)
- 64th (London) Medium Regiment, Royal Artillery
- 2nd Heavy Anti-Aircraft Regiment, Royal Artillery
- 106th (Lancashire Yeomanry) Light Anti-Aircraft Regiment, Royal Artillery

== Sources ==
- Blau, George E. (1986) [1953]. The German Campaigns in the Balkans (Spring 1941) (Reissue ed.). Washington DC: United States Army Center of Military History. OCLC 16940402. CMH Pub 104-4. Archived from the original on 2009-06-19.
- Αγώνες εις την Ανατολικήν Μακεδονίαν και Θράκην (1941) [Battles in East Macedonia and Thrace (1941)] (in Greek). Athens: Hellenic Army General Staff / Army History Directorate. 1956.
- Το τέλος μιας εποποιΐας, Απρίλιος 1941 [The end of an epopee, April 1941] (in Greek). Athens: Hellenic Army General Staff / Army History Directorate. 1959.
- Επίτομη Ιστορία του Ελληνοϊταλικού και Ελληνογερμανικού πολέμου 1940-1941 (Επιχειρήσεις Στρατού Ξηράς) [Concise History of the Greco-Italian and Greco-German War 1940-1941] (in Greek). Athens: Hellenic Army General Staff / Army History Directorate. 1985.
