= 19th Mechanized Division (Greece) =

Mechanized infantry division of the Hellenic Army, established 1941

19th Mechanized Division 19η Μηχανοκίνητη Μεραρχία
- Active: 15 January – 10 April 1941
- Country: Kingdom of Greece
- Branch: Hellenic Army
- Type: Mechanized infantry
- Part of: Eastern Macedonia Army Section
- Engagements: Battle of the Metaxas Line

The 19th Mechanized Division (Greek: 19η (Note: Greek divisions have traditionally been numbered by Roman numerals; however, the 19th and 20th Divisions and the 21st Brigade were, for reasons unknown, written with Arabic numerals in most official documents at the time. Christodoulou 2012a, p. 23 (note 12)) Μηχανοκίνητη Μεραρχία) was a mechanized infantry division of the Hellenic Army, established on 15 January 1941. Its formation was not completed until late March. Its nucleus was the pre-war Mechanized Cavalry Regiment, augmented with captured Italian tankettes and cars, motorcycles and Universal Carriers provided by the British. Although officially a "mechanized" unit, as the division was mostly truck-borne, it is usually called the 19th Motorized Division in English-language literature.

The division confronted the German invasion of Greece on 6 April 1941, covering the left flank of the Eastern Macedonia Army Section defending the forts of the Metaxas Line. In a series of clashes, the division was destroyed piecemeal as a fighting formation by 9 April. Its remnants surrendered along with the rest of the Hellenic Army in eastern Macedonia on 10 April.

== Establishment ==
The origins of the division lie in the first attempts of the Hellenic Army to introduce mechanization in the interwar period. In 1926, the formation of a tank regiment was planned, but it was abolished the following year due to financial difficulties. In 1931, Greece acquired its first tanks—two Vickers 6-ton light tanks, one each of Type A and Type B, and two Carden Loyd tankettes. Initially used for training, they were formed into a tank battalion in 1935, with the expectation that they would be complemented with 14 light tanks ordered in Britain and France. In the event, these were never delivered due to the priority given by Britain and France to their own rearmament and the outbreak of World War II.

In 1937, a Mechanized Cavalry Regiment was formed within the Hellenic Army's single Cavalry Division, in an apparent effort to follow the French Division Légère de Cavalerie model. The regiment comprised c. 165 trucks (44 each of Mercedes-Benz W 152 and Mercedes-Benz LG 2500 and 75 other trucks, mostly Fiats), as well as motorcycles and other vehicles, but no armoured cars or tanks.

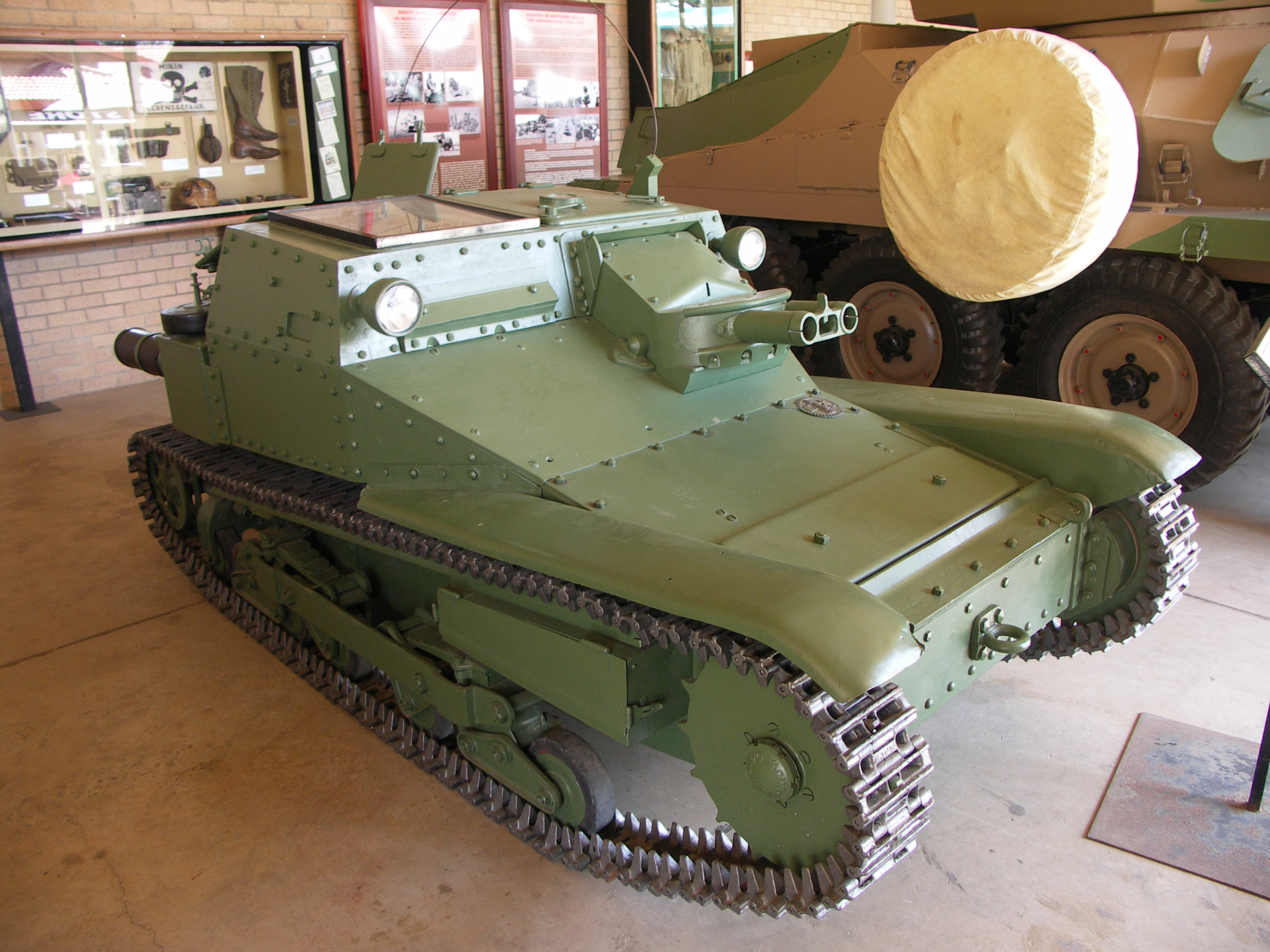
L3/35 displayed at the South African National Museum of Military History

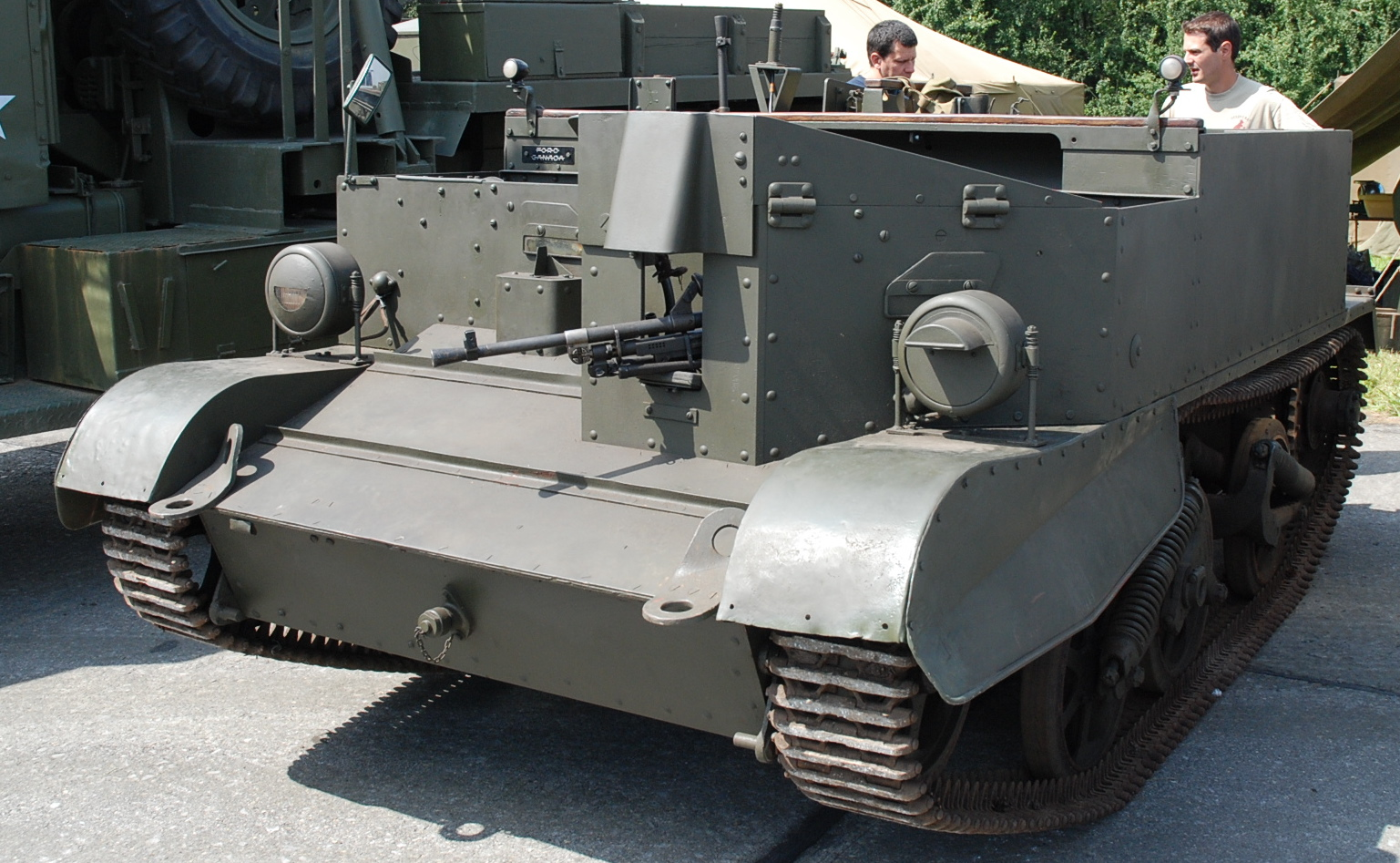
Universal Carrier equipped as mortar carrier

With the outbreak of the Greco-Italian War on 28 October 1940, the Mechanized Cavalry Regiment mobilized and fought as part of the Cavalry Division and later of the 8th Infantry Division. On 15 December, a Tank Company was formed within the regiment out of 35 L3/35 tankettes captured from the Italians in the Battle of Elaia–Kalamas. At the same time, a Tank School was set up in December in Athens, aiming to prepare Greek crews for the use of 40 Light Tank Mk IIIB "Dutchman" tanks promised as aid by the British; in the event, only ten of these were delivered to Greece, but the British sent also 100 Universal Carriers and 185 Austin 8 HP cars equipped with machine-guns.

With this equipment at hand, the Greek GHQ issued an order (ΑΠ 7014) on 15 January 1941 for the establishment of the 19th Mechanized Division at Athens, under Major General Nikolaos Lioumbas. The division was to be structured around the Tank School, with a complement of 77 Universal Carriers and 100 Austins. The entire Mechanized Cavalry Regiment was to be incorporated in it, and further personnel were provided from the Cavalry Division (40 officers and 1,000 other ranks). Despite several applications by infantry officers, none were selected to serve in the new division, which was exclusively staffed by cavalry personnel (c. 8,000 men). The initial order provided for the establishment of a full tank regiment and two mechanized infantry regiments, but due to the aforementioned lack of tanks this never came to pass.

Due to delays in the officers and men arriving from the Albanian front, the first subunits became operational on 12 February. On 16 February, it began its move to the Larissa–Tyrnavos–Trikala area, where it was assembled by 26 February. The division was subordinated to the Central Macedonia Army Section (TSKM) upon its establishment (4 March) and moved to the area of Katerini, where its units arrived by 10 March. Between 14 and 17 March, the Mechanized Cavalry Regiment, transferred from the Albanian front, was gradually incorporated into the division: its Light Company formed the 19th Reconnaissance Group; its 1st Combat Company, with the 1st and 4th MG troops and the 1st and 4th Mortar Troops, formed the 191st Mechanized Regiment; its 2nd Combat Company, with the 2nd MG troop and the 2nd Mortar Troop, formed the 192nd Mechanized Regiment; and its 3rd Combat Company, with the 3rd MG troop and the 3rd Mortar Troop, formed the 193rd Mechanized Regiment.

The Tank Company followed in late March. The tanks had to be driven all the way from the front in Albania to the division's new staging area at Kilkis, which resulted in two falling out of action and considerable wear on the rest, a major headache in view of the almost complete lack of spare parts. The haste in forming the division and scarcity of material meant that the division was barely battle-worthy, and insufficiently motorized. Brigadier H.V.S. Charrington, commander of the British 1st Armoured Brigade, described it as "recently enlisted garage hands", with "no possible prospect of fighting usefully as a mobile force".

== Order of battle ==
Following its formation, the division comprised the following units:

- Divisional Headquarters
- 191st Mechanized Regiment (191ο Μηχανοκίνητο Σύνταγμα)
  - 1st Foot Battalion (Ι Τάγμα Πεζομάχων)
    - Combat Company (Ίλη Μάχης), 120 men with Mannlicher–Schönauer carbines, 8 Lebel rifles with the VB rifle grenade, and twelve 6.5 mm machine guns
    - MG Troop (Ουλαμός Πολυβόλων), four 7.92 mm Hotchkiss machine guns
    - Mortar Troop (Ουλαμός Όλμων), four 81 mm mortars
    - Austin-mounted MG Company (Λόχος Πολυβόλων επί 'Ωστιν), 12 Austin 8 cars with a 7.7 mm Hotchkiss machine gun each
  - 2nd Tank Battalion (ΙΙ Τάγμα Αρμάτων)
    - 1st Closed Tank Company (1ος Λόχος Κλειστών Αρμάτων), nine Light Tank Mk IIIB tanks
    - 2nd Bren Open Tank Company (2ος Λόχος Ανοιχτών Αρμάτων Μπρεν), 11 Universal Carriers with two Boys anti-tank rifles and three 2-inch mortars
    - 3rd Bren Open Tank Company (3ος Λόχος Ανοιχτών Αρμάτων Μπρεν), as above
    - 4th Motorcyclists Company (4ος Λόχος Μοτοσυκλεττιστών), 48 two-seat Norton 16H motorcycles and 6 MG-armed Austin 8s
    - Transport corps, 15 trucks
- 192nd Mechanized Regiment (192ο Μηχανοκίνητο Σύνταγμα)
  - as with the 191st, except that the Closed Tank Company comprised nine L3/35 tankettes
- 193rd Mechanized Regiment (193ο Μηχανοκίνητο Σύνταγμα)
  - as with the 191st, except that the Closed Tank Company comprised nine L3/35 tankettes
- 19th Reconnaissance Group (19η Ομάδα Αναγνωρίσεως)
  - Light Company (Ελαφρά Ίλη)
  - Bren Open Tank Company (Λόχος Ανοιχτών Αρμάτων Μπρεν), 11 Universal Carriers
- 19th Mechanized Artillery Battalion (19η Μηχανοκίνητη Μοίρα Πυροβολικού)
  - Skoda battery carried on automobiles (Πυροβολαρχία Σκόντα φερόμενη επί αυτοκινήτων), 4 Skoda 75 mm Model 15 on cars
  - "English" battery of 4 Ordnance QF 18-pounders modified during World War I by the US to 75 mm calibre (designated M1917), handed over to the British through Lend-Lease; towed by Quads
- 19th Mechanized Anti-Aircraft Artillery Battalion (19η Μηχανοκίνητη Μοίρα Αντιαεροπορικού Πυροβολικού)
  - 1st Mechanized Anti-Aircraft Artillery Battery (1η Μηχανοκίνητη Πυροβολαρχία Αντιαεροπορικού Πυροβολικού), four 3.7 cm Flak 36/37 guns
  - 2nd Mechanized Anti-Aircraft Artillery Battery (2η Μηχανοκίνητη Πυροβολαρχία Αντιαεροπορικού Πυροβολικού), four 2 cm Flak 30 guns
- 19th Communications Company (19ος Λόχος Διαβιβάσεων)
- 19th Medical Detachment (19ο Υγειονομικό Απόσπασμα)
- 19th Supply Detachment (19ο Απόσπασμα Επιμελητείας)
- 1st–4th Mechanized Anti-Tank Troop (1ος–4ος Αντιαρματικός Μηχανοκίνητος Ουλαμός), of two Cannone da 47/32 M35 guns, captured from the Italians, each
- 1st–2nd 20mm Anti-Tank Troop (1ος–2ος Αντιαρματικός Ουλαμός των 20), of two Solothurn S-18/100 anti-tank rifles, captured from the Italians, each
- 1st–2nd Automobile Squadron (1η–2η Διμοιρία Αυτοκινήτων)
- 927 Postal Sector (927 Ταχυδρομικός Τομέας)

== Combat history ==
The division's original role, as part of TSKM, was to cover the Mount Vermion–Mount Olympus line, shielding the British "W Force" as it assembled in its rear. It therefore occupied the eastern, coastal sector in front of Mount Olympus. As the units of "W Force" arrived and took positions on the Vermion–Olympus line, the British commander, Lt. General Henry Maitland Wilson, planned to assign the division to cover a sector of some 11 km north of Katerini, with the sea to their right and the 2nd New Zealand Division to their left. However, on 20 March, the division was redeployed north, around Lake Doiran, on anti-paratrooper duties, leaving the Olympus sector to be covered by overstretched New Zealand troops.

On 28–29 March, in the face of the looming German invasion, the division moved further northeast to the area of Kilkis and Lachanas, coming under the control of the Eastern Macedonia Army Section (TSAM). On the way the two Italian tankette companies, along with the car-mounted Skoda battery, were detached and stationed at Neos Koukloutzas near Thessaloniki in anti-paratrooper duties. On 30 March, the 19th Reconnaissance Group was likewise detached for anti-paratrooper duties in the rear of the 7th Infantry Division at Doxato, while the 191st Regiment was detached as reserve for TSAM's Group of Divisions (14th and 18th Infantry Divisions) in the Sidirokastro area.

The remainder of the division was tasked with three possible missions: securing the border sector Lake Doiran–Polykastro, currently lightly held by the 9th Border Sector; the reinforcement of the Mount Krousia defensive line, held by the Krousia Detachment (Απόσπασμα Κρουσίων); and covering the Group of Divisions' retreat should they be forced to abandon the main defensive line along Mount Beles. From 30 March, the division was engaged in reconnoitring these areas. On 4 April, the division was reinforced by the newly constituted IVb Mountain Artillery Battalion (IVβ Μοίρα Ορειβατικού Πυροβολικού), of two 4-gun batteries with Skoda 75 mm guns captured from the Italians.

=== 6 April ===
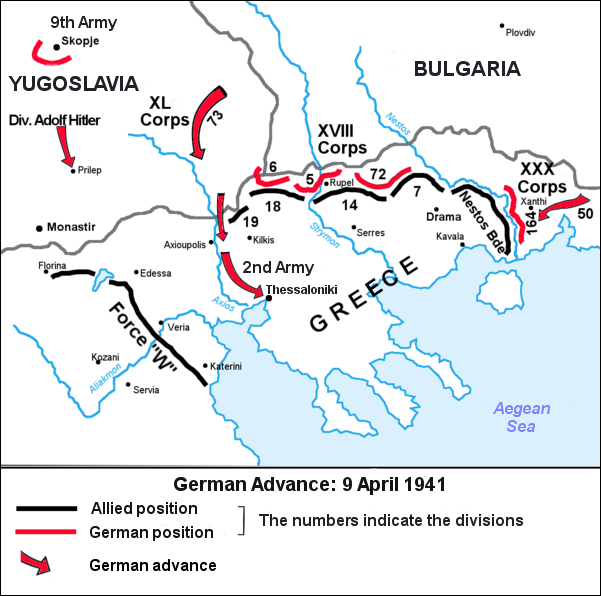
The German flanking of TSAM through Yugoslavia, 6–9 April 1941

With the onset of the German offensive on 6 April, the division assumed positions covering TSAM's left flank up to Lake Doiran. To reinforce it, TSAM subordinated to the division the independent Krousia Detachment under Col. Ilias Sionidis. This was formed around the 2nd Cavalry Regiment (1,400 men, 1,050 horses), with the command staff of the 81st Infantry Regiment, reinforced by the 5th–7th Security Companies, the newly formed 2nd Transport Security Battalion, the B3 Field Artillery Battalion (eight M1917 guns), and two 85 mm mod. 1925 guns and other minor units.

The division commander ordered his units to take up their positions in four sectors, from east to west: the 2nd Cavalry Regiment, west of Lake Kerkini (Lt. Col. Konstantinos Stergiou); the remainder of the Krousia Detachment (Col. Sionidis); 192nd Mechanized Regiment (Col. Konstantinos Asimakis); 193rd Mechanized Regiment (Col. Iason Nomikos). The divisional command post was at Kilkis. The resulting front stretched over 30 km. The available forces, 14 field guns and the effective strength of four infantry battalions, were far below what was necessary to effectively cover this frontage. In addition, further difficulties were presented by the inadequate communications network between the various units, while the expected air supremacy of the Luftwaffe posed particular dangers for mechanized units called upon to move in the open in daylight.

Preceded by mixed Universal Carrier and motorcycle reconnaissance detachments, the 192nd and 193rd Regiments began moving to their designated areas after noon, and arrived there at nightfall. At this point, 192nd Regiment could muster only 295 men, while another 241 could not be moved by vehicle—presumably due to a large number of breakdowns and the lack of spare parts and were ordered to proceed to Kilkis.

Shortly after 17:00, about 45 German planes bombed the 192nd Regiment at the village of Theodorovo. Two officers and 15 men were killed, over 50 personnel were wounded, while two Carriers, ten Austins and ten motorcycles were destroyed, effectively destroying the 2nd Open Tank Company as a combat formation. Col. Sionidis' command, which was also in the village, suffered 13 dead and 45 wounded. Despite these losses, the 192nd Regiment reached its assigned positions, where it divided into two Resistance Centres: left, with the Tank Battalion and one of the 47 mm anti-tank troops, and the right, with the Foot Battalion and a 20 mm anti-tank troop. Initial German probing attacks during the night were successfully repelled.

193rd Regiment was more fortunate; it reached its deployment area without major obstacles, although a reconnaissance patrol clashed with the Germans near Kato Sourmena, and returned with a German prisoner. On the same evening, the division's 3.7 cm Flak shot down a German reconnaissance plane over Krisia railway station, and reconnaissance patrols reported German infiltration along the entire line of the railway track between Mouries and Rodopoli.

During the night, the division was allocated reinforcements from the 1st Security Battalion of Thessaloniki in the form of two infantry companies (one for each of the 192nd and 193rd Regiments), two MG squads and a 75 mm battery. In order to reconstitute the 192nd Regiment's 2nd Open Tank Company, divisional command ordered the crews of the two Italian-equipped Closed Tank Companies to abandon their vehicles and help man the Universal Carriers. The Italian tanks were hence abandoned and took no part in the fighting, but the reorganization of the 2nd Open Tank Company was not completed until April 8. 191st Regiment was also ordered to send a squadron of its Tank Company to the Rupel Pass.

=== 7 April ===
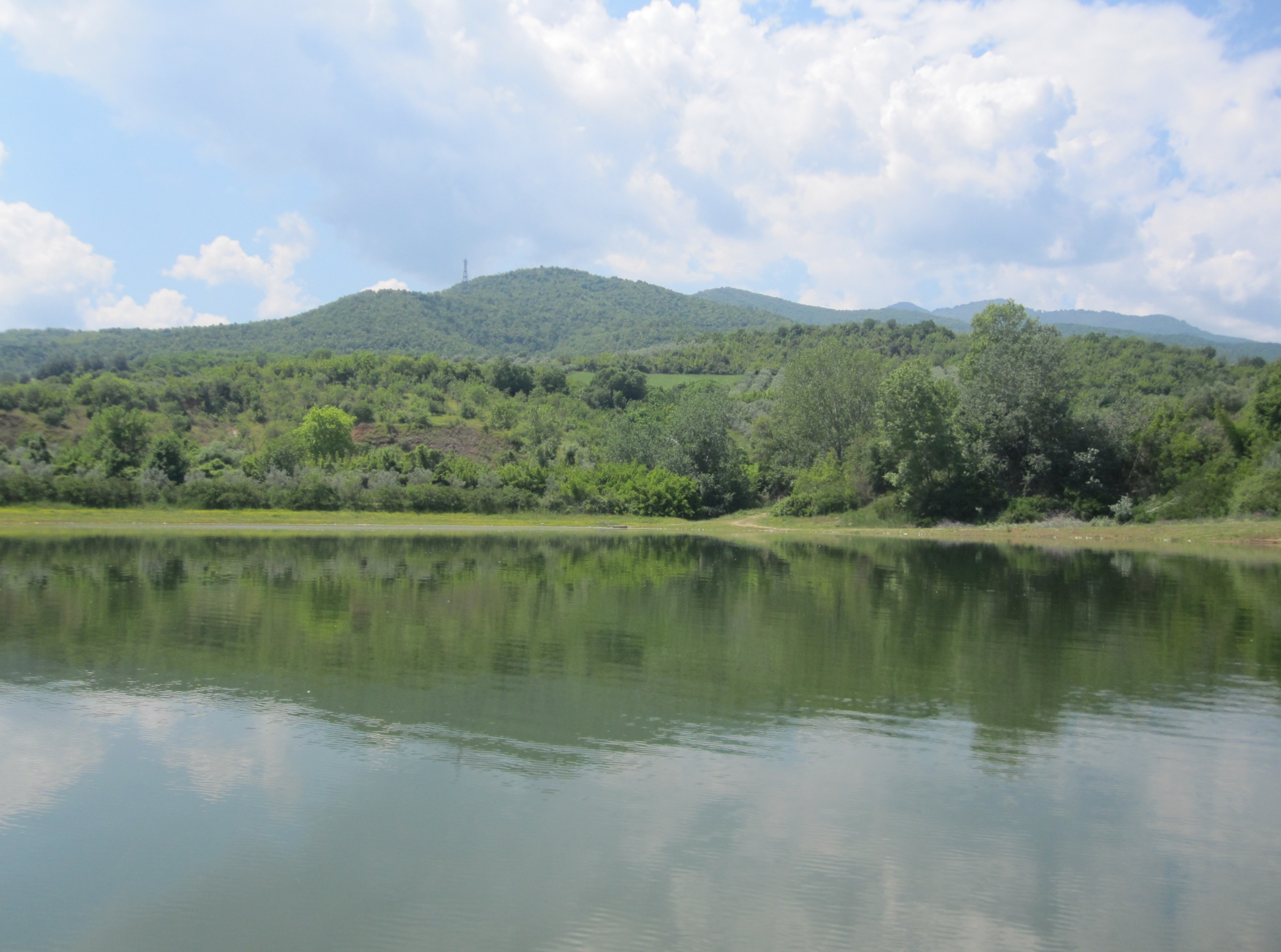
Mount Krousia, as seen from Lake Kerkini (2016)

Early in the morning of 7 April, the Germans launched an attack through the level plain between Lake Doiran and the mountains, but was repelled and retreated north of Mouries. On the same day, however, news of the collapse of the Yugoslav front to the north opened the possibility that German forces would outflank TSAM through the Vardar River valley, and TSAM ordered the 19th Division to plug the gap by extending its front to the west up to the Vardar. The division took over the troops of the 11th Border Sector as well, while the remainder of the 1st Security Battalion (a further two infantry companies and MG squads) and three 3.7 cm Flak guns were sent as reinforcements, denuding Thessaloniki of virtually any military unit. The 19th Reconnaissance Group was also ordered to move to the division's support. Arriving after an 85 km night march at the village of Metalliko in the early hours of the next day, it formed the division's only reserve.

The division now was ordered to occupy a front some 50 km wide, divided into three subsectors: Eastern, from Akritas to Tavoulari, held by the 192nd Regiment, minus its Foot Battalion which remained at the Krousia sector; Central, at the Metamorfosi heights, to be occupied by the two companies sent from Thessaloniki; and Western, at the Batsova heights, taken over by the 11th Border Sector (two infantry companies). The remainder of the division remained in the Krousia area.

=== 8 April ===
The 192nd Regiment's movement to occupy the Akritas–Tavoulari area was much delayed, so at 03:00, the 19th Reconnaissance Group was ordered to move forward and occupy it instead, as the Greek front was threatened by the advance of the 2nd Panzer Division. In addition, 193rd Regiment was ordered to dispatch two of its infantry companies to the area. These units had barely arrived at Akritas and occupied the Oveliskos height, when the German forces appeared at 06:00 in the form of two armoured columns with aerial support. The German attack forced the elements of 193rd Regiment to abandon the height and withdraw south towards Akritas, where the 19th Reconnaissance Group had begun arriving. The 19th Reconnaissance Group commander sent a company to reinforce 193rd Regiment and deployed his troops covering Akritas village from the north, aiming to counterattack as soon as 192nd Regiment arrived to take over the position.

The 19th Reconnaissance Group met the German attack divided into three groups, each composed of a Carrier troop, a troop of the Group's Light Company, and three motorcycles with sidecars. Unable to resist the German attack, after a brief struggle, in which they reported two enemy tanks destroyed, the Greek forces defending Akritas retreated to the heights south of the village. The Germans left a few tanks in the village and moved in two columns to capture the village of Megali Sterna on the one hand and the Kalindria railway station and the village of Cherso on the other. Through their capture of Akritas and the heights to its north, the Germans scored a significant success, opening the path to attacking the Krousia position from the rear. As a result, the surviving forces of the 193rd Regiment and the 19th Reconnaissance Group became de facto encircled and cut off by the two fast-moving German columns, as were the companies of the 9th Border Sector on the division's extreme left. Lacking any heavy weapons, these units had no choice but remain in place and await the arrival of the 192nd Regiment.

The latter, however, would not arrive. Moving from Myriofyto towards Akritas, it was attacked by a German column near Amaranta anad forced to withdraw towards Myriofyto. Further east, another German tank column surprised and took prisoner the two companies of the 1st Security Battalion marching to take over the Metamorfosi heights position. The Batsova heights were occupied by one company of the 11th Border Sector, arriving from Kilkis in cars, but a company of the 1st Security Battalion tasked with joining it disintegrated on the march. As a result, by 10:30 the left flank of the division had become cut off and the Germans had effectively broken through the left of the Krousia defensive line. Further chaos resulted from an order to the division's units to retreat, which was countermanded by TSAM, resulting in some units remaining in place while others began abandoning the Krousia position. Thus 192nd Regiment left its Foot Battalion in the Krousia area and began withdrawing towards Kilkis. In the same night, 191st Regiment dispatched a mixed mechanized detachment—a light tank company, a car-borne company, and the "English" artillery company—to reinforce the Greek positions north of Sidirokastro.

=== 9 and 10 April ===
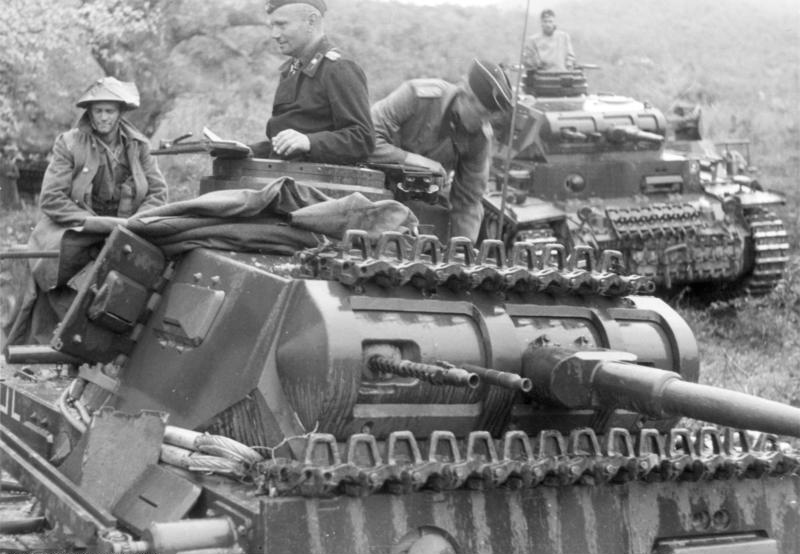
Panzer IIIs of the 2nd Panzer Division with a New Zealander prisoner of war, near Panteleimon on 16 April

With his division disintegrating and the Germans advancing—German troops captured Kilkis by 23:00 and entered Thessaloniki at 08:00 in the morning—Lioumbas transferred his command post from Kilkis northeast to the village of Kentriko, where he arrived on 02:00 in the morning, shortly before 192nd Regiment. After contacting his subordinate commanders, and with no contact with TSAM, he ordered the withdrawal of the division southeast along the sole free road towards the villages of Elliniko and Kleisto.

The mechanized elements of 192nd Regiment arrived at Elliniko first, at 07:00. Most of the other units in the Krousia sector first withdrew to the heights north and northeast of the Panorama village, while 2nd Transport Security Battalion and 2nd Cavalry Regiment headed directly for Elliniko. The units in the Panorama area were all ordered to retreat to Elliniko at 04:00, and arrived there c. 15:30. 192nd Regiment's Foot Battalion also withdrew to the heights north of Panorama, but was soon flanked on its left by the Germans, and was forced to withdraw to Kentriko, where it arrived c. 04:30. Due to the confusion and the disordered mixing of various units, it was not until afternoon that the Foot Battalion was reunited with the rest of the 192nd Regiment at Elliniko. The retreat of 192nd Regiment however left 193rd Regiment without cover on its right flank, and at 02:30 the Germans attacked it from both the right and the rear. After a brief struggle, the regimental commander gave orders to surrender.

Following the general capitulation of TSAM, the remnants of the 19th Mechanized Division surrendered to the Germans at Serres in the afternoon of 10 April, while the remnants of the Krousia Detachment did so near Thessaloniki. The division's commander, chief of staff, and a few other officers chose instead to withdraw to the area of Chalkidiki. Apart from sending detachments, 191st Regiment did not participate en masse in battle. As soon as news came of the fall of Thessaloniki, the regiment moved to Stavros, where it disintegrated, with its men dispersing across Chalkidiki. This signalled the end of the division and its major sub-units as coherent fighting forces.

== Legacy ==
The Hellenic Army considers the 19th Mechanized Division as its first major mechanized formation, and the progenitor of the modern Greek Armour combat arm, which inherited the traditions of the Cavalry arm after World War II.

== Sources ==
- Blau, George E. (1986) [1953]. The German Campaigns in the Balkans (Spring 1941) (Reissue ed.). Washington, DC: United States Army Center of Military History. OCLC 16940402. CMH Pub 104-4. Archived from the original on 2009-06-19.
- Christodoulou, Dimitrios (2012a). "Οι ελληνικές μηχανοκίνητες δυνάμεις κατά τον ελληνοϊταλικό και ελληνογερμανικό πόλεμο (1940-41), Μέρος 1ο". Ιππικό – Τεθωρακισμένα, No. 74 (January–March 2012) [The Greek Mechanized Forces During the Greek–Italian and Greek–German War (1940-41), Part 1] (PDF). Association of Retired Cavalry- Armored Corps Officers (Greek: Σύνδεσμος Αποστράτων Αξιωματικών Ιππικού-Τεθωρακισμένων). pp. 21–24. Archived from the original on 2024-12-18.
- Christodoulou, Dimitrios (2012b). "Οι ελληνικές μηχανοκίνητες δυνάμεις κατά τον ελληνοϊταλικό και ελληνογερμανικό πόλεμο (1940-41), Μέρος 2ο". Ιππικό – Τεθωρακισμένα, No. 75 (April–June 2012) [The Greek Mechanized Forces During the Greek–Italian and Greek–German War (1940-41), Part 2]. Cavalry–Armour Retired Officers Union. pp. 18–21.
- Christodoulou, Dimitrios (2012c). "Οι ελληνικές μηχανοκίνητες δυνάμεις κατά τον ελληνοϊταλικό και ελληνογερμανικό πόλεμο (1940-41), Τελευταίο Μέρος". Ιππικό – Τεθωρακισμένα, No. 76 (July–September 2012) [The Greek Mechanized Forces During the Greek–Italian and Greek–German War (1940-41), Final part]. Cavalry–Armour Retired Officers Union. pp. 17–18.
- Hellenic Army General Staff, Training Directorate/3a (March 1995). Ιστορία Ιππικού - Τεθωρακισμένων [History of the Cavalry–Armour Arm] (PDF). Athens: Hellenic Army Printing Office.
- Stockings, Craig; Hancock, Eleanor (2013). Swastika over the Acropolis: Re-interpreting the Nazi Invasion of Greece in World War II. Leiden: BRILL. ISBN 978-90-04-25459-6.
