= Battle of Lake Kastoria =

Battle of Kastoria
- Part of the German invasion of Greece
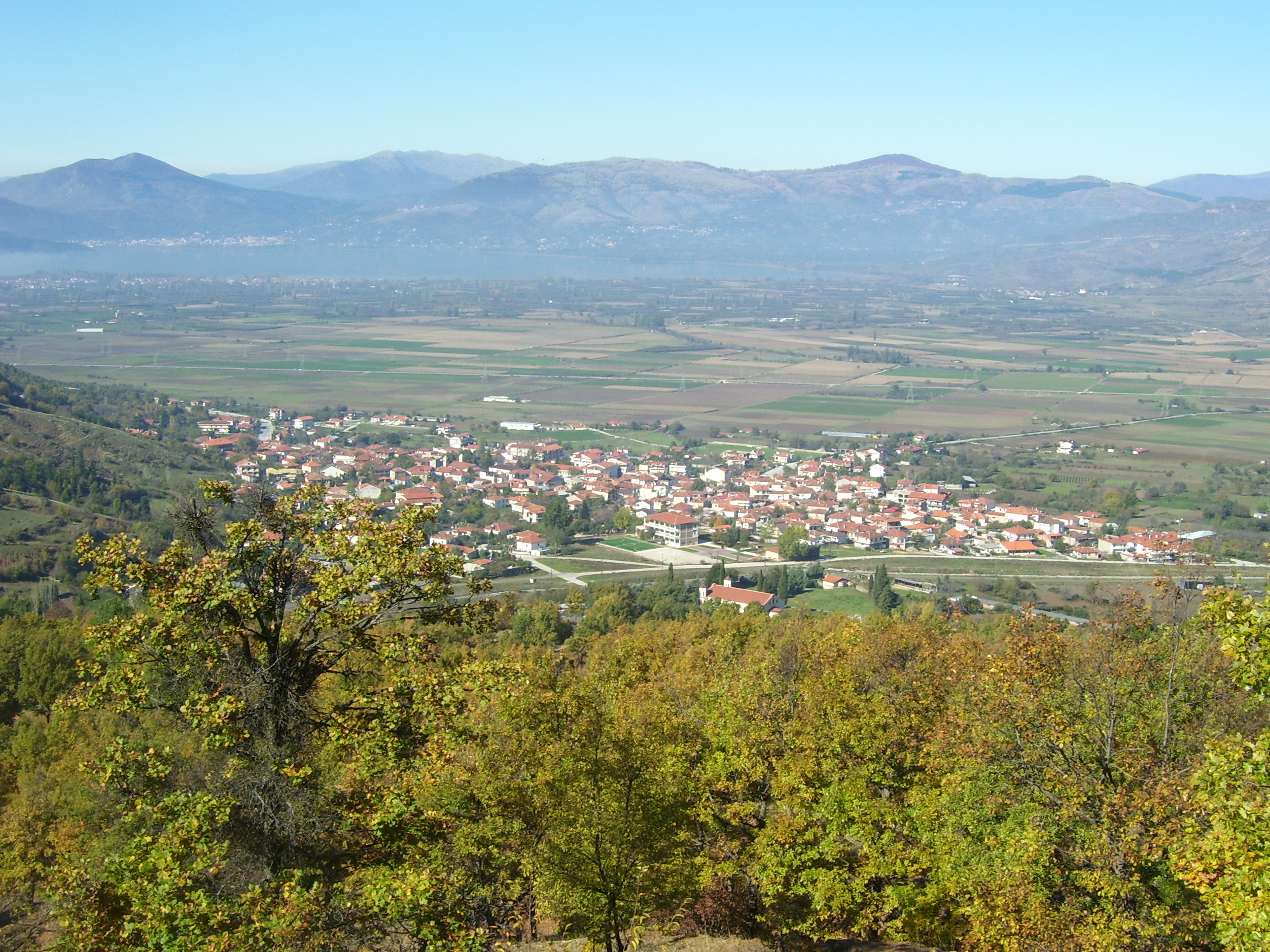
- Lake Kastoria viewed southeast from Korisos. The plains in the background were the area where the German artillery deployed.
| Date | 15 April 1941 |
| Location | Kastoria, West Macedonia, Greece |
| Result | German victory |

Belligerents
| Greece | (Nazi Germany) Germany |

Commanders and leaders
| (Greece) Mj. Gen. Sotirios Moutousis (Greece) Col. Efstathios Liosis | (Nazi Germany) SS-Ogruf Josef Dietrich (Nazi Germany) Standartenführer Staudinger (Nazi Germany) Sturmbannführer Kurt Meyer |

Strength
| Cavalry Division; 13th Infantry Division (elements): 1 reconnaissance battalion (horse cavalry); 2 understrength infantry battalions (understrength); 1 machine-gun battalion; 7 batteries of light and heavy artillery | Leibstandarte SS Adolf Hitler (elements): 1 armoured reconnaissance battalion; 2 motorised infantry battalions; 6 medium and heavy artillery batteries; 3 companies of infantry guns; 40 light bombers |

Casualties and losses
| 160+ killed 12,000 captured 34 guns destroyed 2 anti-air guns destroyed | Unknown |

The Battle of Lake Kastoria (Greek: Μάχη λίμνης Καστοριάς) consisted of two parallel engagements north and south of Lake Kastoria (individually known in Greek as the battles of Argos Orestiko and of Foteini Pass) between Greek and German forces on 15 April 1941. Following the Greek failure to hold the Pass of Kleisoura, on 14 April, a new attempt was made to stop the German advance east of the road Bilisht (in Albania) – Kastoria – Grevena, which was used as the main route for the withdrawal of the Greek Western Macedonia Army Section.

== Prelude ==
The origin of the battle lies with the battle of Kleisoura Pass, crossing between mountains Vitsi and Siniatsiko immediately to the east of the plain of Kastoria, separating it from the plains of Ptolemaida. In the engagement fought on 13 and 14 April, the Greek detachment comprising elements from the Greek 20th Infantry Division failed to hold the German LSSAH brigade. In the midday 14 April, the commander of the Greek Western Macedonia Army Section (TSDM), after having been asked by Central Macedonia Army Section (TSKM) to send reinforcements for the 20th Division to counterattack, dispatched from its own 13th Infantry Division the I/23 battalion on motor vehicles, while additional forces were marching on foot. Because the units could not arrive in time, the counterattack never took place. Instead, the German LSSAH brigade advanced forward to meet the Greek detachments gathering around Lake Kastoria.

== Opposing forces ==
=== Greek forces ===
The Greek forces that participated in the battle belonged to the Cavalry Division north of the lake, and principally to the 13th Infantry Division south of the lake.

The 20th Infantry Division was in poor shape after its long retreat between 10 and 13 April and the defeat at the battle of Kleisoura Pass, and concentrated around the village Smixi, immediately to the south of the 13th Division. At 02:00 hours on 15 April the 20th Division received from TSKM the order to move southwards and deploy in the area west of the Aliakmon River and between Tsotyli and Neapoli.

The Greek Cavalry Division, part of the TSDM, was the first Greek unit to withdraw from Albania, already since 8 April, taking positions south of Lake Prespa, facing the plain of Florina which was expected to fall to German units coming southwards through Yugoslavia. The division remained on the defensive, and successfully held back elements of the LSSAH attacking from Florina, in the battle of Pisoderi Pass. On 14 April however, following the collapse of the Greek defense on the Kleisoura Pass, the division's sector was threatened from the south, and the division sent forward the 21st Reconnaissance Group (Vosniadis' Squadron) plus one Cavalry Squadron from the 1st Cavalry Regiment, as well as a troop (2 guns) of 47mm anti-tank guns. The detachment received support from one battalion of heavy artillery.

The 13th Infantry Division, consisting of the 18th, 22nd and 23rd Infantry Regiments had taken part in the short lived joint Greek–Yugoslav offensive in Albania agreed prior to the German attack. The division had attacked with two battalions on 7 April north of Pogradec, taking some Italian positions and many prisoners, but also suffering substantial casualties (763 killed and wounded). The information arriving from Yugoslavia regarding the situation there, convinced the Greek command to call off the attacks for 8 April, and the division reverted to the defensive. On the same day elements of the division entered Yugoslav territory and carried out demolitions on the road leading to Pogradec to protect its flank. In the night of 12–13 April the division began its withdrawal, breaking contact with the Italians successfully at 22:00 on 12 April. Having covered 45 kilometers in 17 hours, on 13 April the division's HQ was at Bilisht, where it remained for a day, in order to cover the withdrawal of the other units of TSDM. The division was briefly bombarded by the Italian air force on 13 April, and on 14 April Italian Bersaglieri elements made contact with the division's rearguard, while 26 Italian prisoners were taken in an ambush. Late on 14 April the entire division was set in motion towards Argos Orestiko. Due to the congestion created by the division's using a single route, the movement during the night of 14–15 April was particularly slow.

Also on 14 April, as mentioned above, the division received the request to mount two battalions on motor vehicles to be sent for the counterattack on Kleisoura Pass. The number of vehicles available sufficed for only a battalion of infantry. Battalion I/23 had marched some 60 kilometres (37 mi) in 15 hours and had reached Bilisht at 15:30 where it took the order to move to Argos Orestiko and be put under command of 21st Infantry Brigade. Loading of the first elements began at 16:30 and was eventually completed by 18:15, as initially an insufficient number of trucks was provided. Arriving at 20:00 hours at Argos Orestiko the battalion found a chaotic situation and panic-stricken units of the 20th Division. Following a brief confusion regarding the battalion's exact mission, the 13th Division's commander ordered the battalion to dismount and take positions defensively on the hills east of the line Limenakia–Ampelokipoi, covering the division's withdrawal. For that purpose, the commander sent also the battalion-sized 13th Reconnaissance Group, a company of four heavy machine guns (of 13.2 mm caliber) and a field battery of 3 guns creating a detachment which was placed under the command of the division's infantry commander, Colonel Efstathios Liosis. By the morning of 15 April the detachment was further reinforced with an additional 3 field and 4 heavy artillery batteries, while the 2nd Positional Machinegun battalion was sent to replace the 13th Reconnaissance Group which was to cover the front further south. In fact he commander of the 2nd Positional Machinegun Battalion didn't obey the order, claiming much later that the order was not written and that the positions assigned to it were vulnerable to tanks.

=== German forces ===
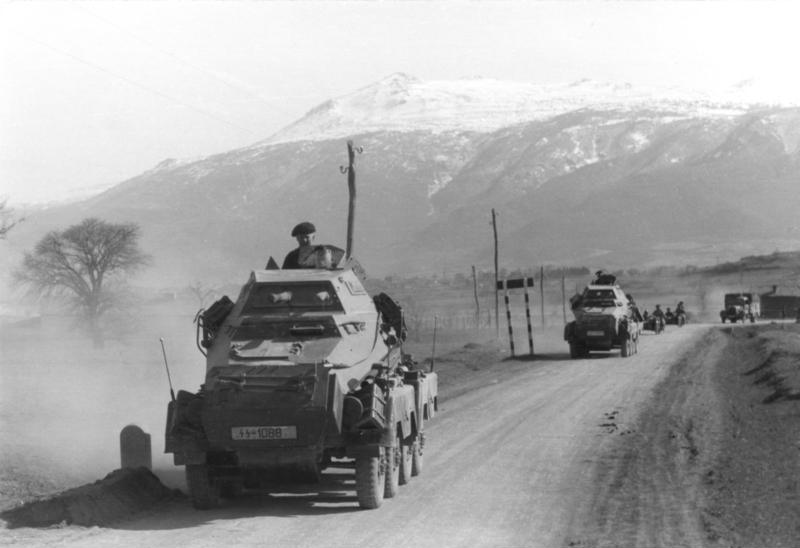
Armored reconnaissance vehicles belonging to the LSSAH during the Balkan campaign (photo taken in Yugoslavia or Bulgaria)

The German forces that participated in the battle belonged to the Leibstandarte SS Adolf Hitler (LSSAH), an SS motorised unit of brigade size. More specifically the units that participated in the action were the reinforced Reconnaissance Battalion under Sturmbannführer Kurt Meyer which acted as LSSAH's vanguard battlegroup, as well as the III/LSSAH and II/LSSAH motorised infantry battalions and the entire LSSAH Artillery Regiment (two battalions with a total of 24 guns).

Meyer's battlegroup included besides the Reconnaissance battalion's organic strength (one armoured car company, two motorcycle infantry companies, one heavy weapons company), also a troop of light 7.5 centimetres (3.0 in) and another of heavy 15 centimetres (5.9 in) infantry guns, a troop of Panzerjäger I tank hunters, a troop of 8.8 centimetres (3.5 in) flak guns, and a heavy howitzer 15 centimetres (5.9 in) battery.

== Opposing tactics ==
The Greek plan was to hold the Germans away from the road Bilisht–Grevena, however unknown to the commanders of 13th and Cavalry Division at the time, their mission had actually already been compromised by the collapse of the Greek 12th Infantry Division’s defense on Siatista Pass to the south, which had been abandoned to the German 5th Panzer Division late on 14 April (in reality the Germans attacked again on 15 April to find the Greek positions vacant as the 12th Division had withdrawn west of river Aliakmon).

In order to achieve their task, the Cavalry Division would block the German attack north of Lake Kastoria at Foteini Pass, while the 13th Division would attempt to form a front south of the lake, from its shore to the western slopes of Mt. Siniatsiko. South of the 13th Division, the 20th Division was covering the banks of river Aliakmon from a possible attack from Siatista Pass, having demolished its bridges leaving only a wooden one to permit withdrawal of stragglers.

== The battle ==
The first contact between the German and the Greek line was made at 05:30 on 15 April. The Greek side identified the German forces as light motorized troops supported by 15 “tanks”. Another Greek source based on the account of I/23 battalion's commander mentions 17 “light tanks” and 10 “cars”. Based on Meyer's account it was his own LSSAH's armored reconnaissance battalion which first made contact with the Greek line. Golla also includes the III/LSSAH in the first attacks. The first German attack took place at around 06:00 and was beaten off, with the Greeks claiming to have hit 25 vehicles and caused substantial casualties, although the weakness on the Greek right wing became apparent.

At 11:00, the Germans renewed their attack, reinforced with what the Greeks describe as a truck-borne unit of battalion strength and 10 batteries of heavy artillery. Paschalidis notes that at 10:30 German heavy artillery intensely bombarded the right wing of I/23 causing 3 killed and 10 wounded. He also notes that the Greek position was very poor as the men were immobile in rocky terrain, which under bombardment caused flying rocks to disproportionally increase the amount of wounded Meyer notes that “about midday” the III/LSSAH battalion entered the battle to his left in an effort to envelop the Greek line and reach its line of retreat. This attack was beaten off through the effective fire of the Greek infantry and artillery. Throughout the battle the Greek artillery had good observation on the German artillery and brought down on them very effective counter-battery fire, silencing them and forcing them to change positions. At 13:30, the Germans repeated their infantry attack with strong support by tanks and artillery and by 14:00 succeeded in capturing the village Ampelokipoi on the Greek right wing. The Greek cavalry squadron defending the location suffered heavily, retreated and part of it was captured, after its commander captain Kleitos Hatziliadis was killed in action. Golla notes that the III/LSSAH reached its objective at 14:00 and the Reconnaissance battalion/LSSAH at 1645. At about 1445 the Greek I/23 was reporting that it had suffered some 84 killed and wounded, and its companies were asking for additional stretcher-bearers.

The Greek command which had been worried from the beginning about its weak right flank, started to become desperate, and began using whoever was available, such as artillery gunners, muleteers and engineers, to plug the gap. The situation became more dire when at 15:00 the remaining squadron of the 13 Reconnaissance Group defending hill 681 abandoned it, and the command of 13th division failed to rally it. Thus after that point there were almost no Greek forces south of the village Ampelokipoi and the appearance of German armored vehicles moving in the plains towards Argos Orestiko was considered a matter of time. The commander of the Greek 13th division personally rode a motorcycle and after locating the descending column of the III/22, which was severely weakened in numbers after very long continuous marching, ordered it to move immediately to the hill 681 before the Germans. At 16:30, the battalion had successfully reached the height, thus temporarily relieving the Greek command's worries. For a time it was believed that the situation was salvageable as darkness was about to fall and columns of troops were arriving that could be used as reinforcements.

However at 17:00, the Germans renewed their attack, this time with the support of some 40 Luftwaffe airplanes. The airplanes focused their attacks on the Greek artillery and successfully destroyed 4 guns and many carriages. Personnel losses were limited as they mostly abandoned their guns and took cover. The two 20 mm anti-aircraft guns used by the Greeks were also silenced. The German artillery also joined with full force the attack. The German armor, relieved from the threat of the Greek artillery, moved freely. Progressively the Greek companies and batteries started to report that they were getting encircled, and surrendered. At 18:00, the Maniakoi bridge was ordered demolished and the units to retreat over the bridge north-west from Argos Orestiko. The Greek artillery was fighting with its last shells over open sights. Meyer notes that “one of their batteries continued to fire and was shot to pieces” At 19:00, the German armour encircled and captured Argos Orestiko. Those Greek units that were not able to retreat were captured. Battalion I/23 according to his commander's account had suffered some 160 killed and wounded by the time its remnants retreated towards Argos Orestiko where they were taken prisoner. From the German perspective, Golla notes that the III/LSSAH reached the road north of Argos Orestiko at 18:00, while the Reconnaissance battalion/LSSAH moved along the west bank of Lake Kastoria and eventually reached the town of Kastoria itself. As II/LSSAH, which in the meantime had crossed over Kleisoura pass and joined the action, reached the area south-west of Lake Kastoria, the III/LSSAH was ordered to occupy Argos Orestiko at 23:00. Throughout the night unsuspecting Greek columns that had previously been engaging the Italians to the north continued to come across the Germans at Kastoria. The Germans claimed that by the next morning they had captured 12,000 prisoners and 36 guns.
