= Markos Drakos =

Markos Drakos may refer to:

- Markos Drakos (EOKA fighter) (1932–1957), Cypriot guerrilla fighter
- Markos Drakos (general) (1888–1975), Greek army general
