= Battle of Kleisoura Pass =

World War II battle 13 April 1941 near Lechovo, Greece

Coordinates: 40.535185°N 21.469722°E

- Part of the German invasion of Greece
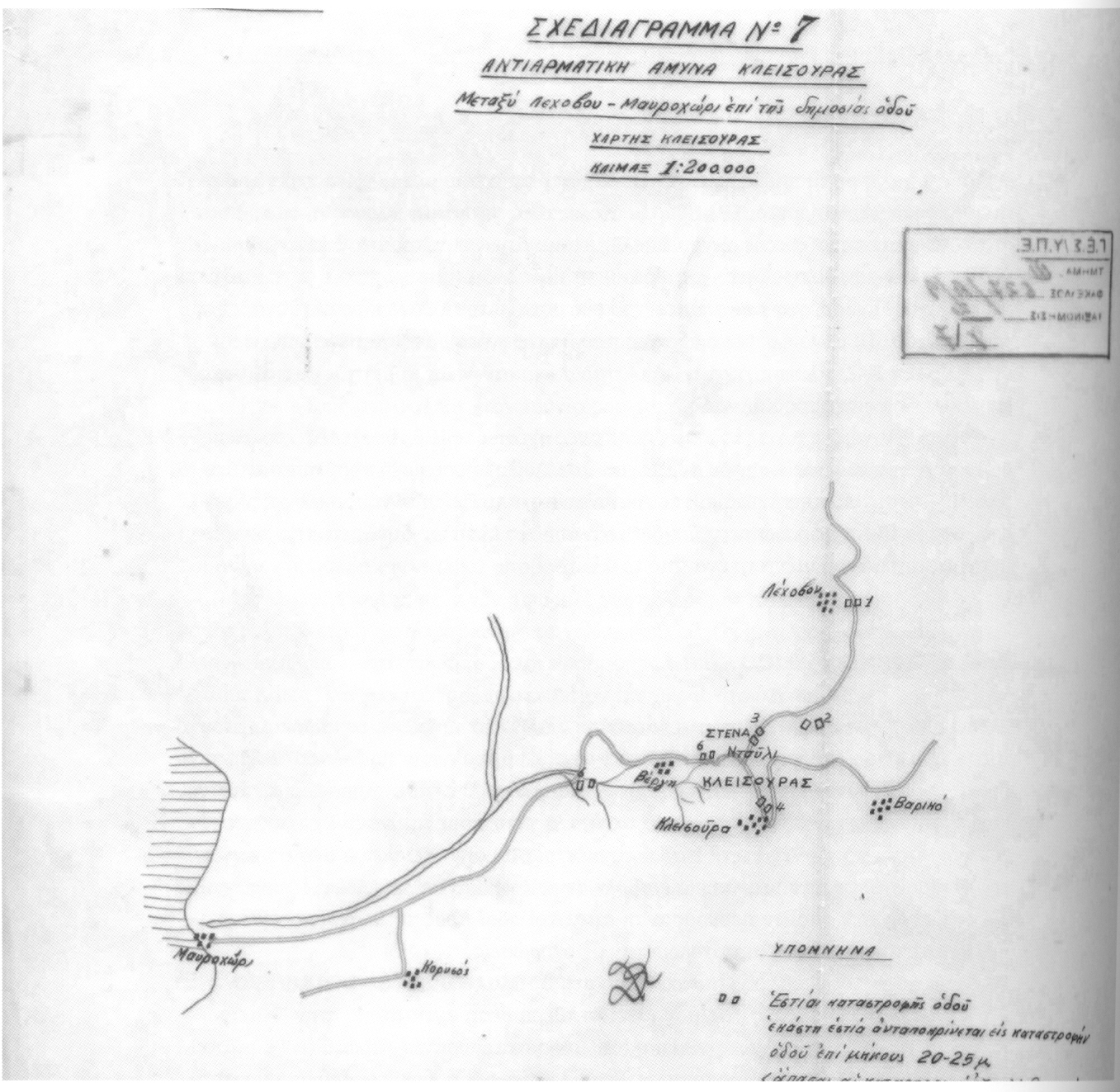
- Kleisoura pass Greek plan of defense.
Date	13–14 April 1941
Location	Kleisoura, West Macedonia, Greece
Result	German victory

Belligerents
Greece	(Nazi Germany) Germany

Commanders and leaders
(Greece) Col. Miltiadis Papakonstantinou (20th Division); Lt. Col. Vasilios Mantzouranis (80th Reg.)	(Nazi Germany) Josef Dietrich

Strength
Unknown	6,500

Casualties and losses
Heavy; 1,000 captured (German claim)	Unknown

The Battle of Kleisoura Pass (Greek: Αγώνας στενωπού Κλεισούρας) took place from the evening of 13 April 1941, when first contact was made, until the midday of 14 April, when Greek organized resistance collapsed. The battle was fought over the narrow pass that crosses between Mt. Vitsi and Mt. Siniatsiko, between elements of the Greek 20th Infantry Division which were occupying the pass and the German Leibstandarte SS Adolf Hitler, a mechanized infantry unit of brigade level. The pass was strategically important for it stood on the main Allied defensive line (Mt.Vitsi– Mt. Siniatsiko– river Aliakmon – Mt. Olympos), behind which passed the withdrawal route of the Greek army engaged against the Italians in Albania.

== Background ==
The rapid German advance through south Yugoslavia prompted Gen. Wilson, commander of W Force, comprising the Australian 1st Corps (2nd New Zealand Division, 6th Australian Division and British 1st Armoured Brigade) and Greek Central Macedonia Army Section (TSKM, comprising 12th and 20th Infantry Divisions), to order a withdrawal from the original defensive line on Mt. Vermion to a new line to the west and south, to accommodate for the developments in Yugoslavia and the emerging danger of a German flanking thrust down the Florina valley, behind the Mt. Vermion line.

For the Greek divisions on the eastern slopes of Mt. Vermion the withdrawal had very detrimental effects, as it meant the abandoning of well prepared positions, and long night marches (for safety against air strikes). The situation was aggravated by the bad weather which was turning into snowstorms on Mt. Vermion, thus further demoralizing the men and slowing down the march.

The withdrawal was covered by a mixed division-sized unit called “Mackay Force” at Klidi Pass. Mackay Force’s failure to hold the German advance long enough meant that the Greek units did not have time to reach and organize their assigned positions—some of them actually being cut off by the German advance and never reaching them.

The Greek 20th Division's task was to occupy and defend the passes of Kleisoura and Vlasti. With the Dodecanese Regiment of the division detached and attached to Mackay Force at Klidi pass, the 80th Regiment was tasked with defending Kleisoura Pass and the 35th Regiment with the defence of Vlasti Pass. Realizing the importance of the Kleisoura Pass and the organization of the location, the commander of TSKM sent ahead on motor vehicles the infantry battalions I/87 and II/80 as well as two sapper companies and a battalion (two batteries) of mountain artillery on 10 April, to prepare the defences. When the Germans made their first contact on 13 April, the bulk of the 20th Division had not yet arrived at the pass. The Dodecanese Regiment in particular had been scattered in transit, and could not be used until it was reorganised.

== Prelude ==
=== Greek forces ===
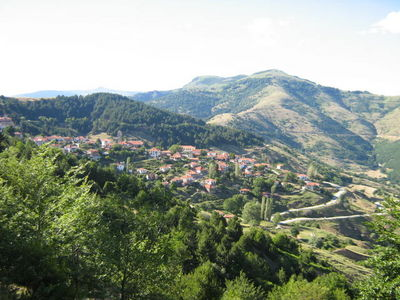
The village of Kleisoura

While battalions I/87 and II/80 were already present at the pass since 10 April, the bulk of the 80th Regiment (battalions I and III) and the 6th Positional Machine-gun battalion began arriving after a night march to Kleisoura village from midday 13 April. At 15:00 about one-third of the regiment had arrived. By the fall of the night the regiment had reorganized and took its assigned positions in the center of the location. Stragglers continued arriving until the morning of 14 April. Battalions were at half-strength in manpower and one-third in heavy weapons (machine-guns and mortars). Ammunition, medical and communications materiel stocks had largely been abandoned at Komnina and Ptolemaida. The 20th Division’s commander gave orders to immediately supply ammunition from nearby Kastoria.

Between 13 and 14 April the forces on the pass were:

- Infantry battalion I/87 and one company of X border sector (Fanos screening company) deployed defensively on heights Soubrets (1623 m) and Sargonitsa (1386 m) north of the road from Florina, and another company (9th/X Border Sector) on a height northeast of Daouli col and south of the same road—all since 10 April and in relatively good fighting condition
- The 6th Positional Machine-gun battalion, with great shortages and 10 machine-guns deployed on Daouli col astride the road from Amyntaio
- Infantry battalion I/80 deployed defensively on the heights north and south of Kleisoura village, lacking one rifle company and a machine-gun platoon, with its present companies at half-strength and greatly fatigued
- Infantry battalion III/80 west of Kleisoura village, in reserve, in similar condition as I/80
- Infantry battalion II/80 further to the south of I/80, deployed defensively between heights Stoulma Manou (1534 m) and Petra Markou (1655 m) since 10 April and in good shape; (the battalion saw no action during the battle)

Col. Panagiotis Dedes, formerly commander of the 21st Brigade, was appointed at the early hours of 14 April to command all Greek units at Kleisoura pass. However he was unable to reach the pass in time due to demolitions on the road, and during the entire battle the commander of 80th regiment, Lt. Col. Vasilios Mantzouranis, was the effective overall commander.

=== German forces ===
The German units to participate in the battle belonged to the LSSAH:

- Regimental Headquarters Staff, under Josef Dietrich
- 1st SS Infantry Battalion (mot), under Fritz Witt
- 2nd SS Infantry Battalion (mot), under Theodor Wisch
- 3rd SS Infantry Battalion (mot)
- 4th SS Infantry Battalion (mot)
- 5th SS Infantry Battalion (mot)
- SS Heavy Infantry Battalion (mot)
- SS Anti-aircraft Battalion 1, under Bernhard Krause
- SS Assault gun (Sturmgeschütz) Battalion 1
- SS Engineer Battalion 1
- SS Reconnaissance Battalion 1, under Kurt Meyer

== Battle ==
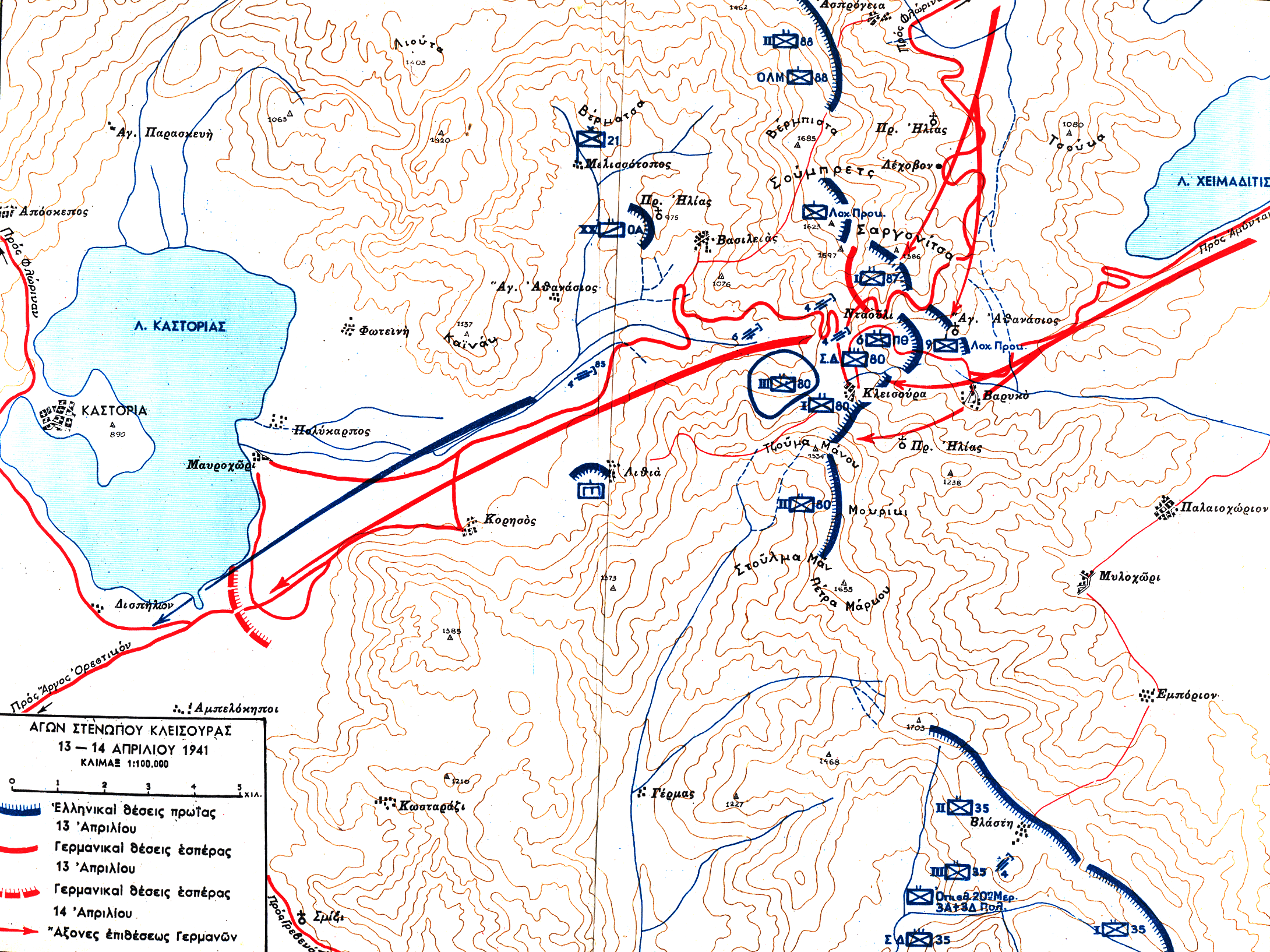
Map of the battle

=== 13 April ===
Demolitions were carried out along the road between Lehovo and Kleisoura in order to delay the German advance. The first contact was made at 17:00 on 13 April. German forward elements attacked the Greek line, particularly battalion I/87 on height Sargonitsa. With intense effort and artillery support, the attacking Germans managed at 21:00 to throw back the I/87 in disarray, its elements retreating towards heights 1597 and 1623. The 1st company of the battalion, deployed on the left of its line, surrendered to the Germans except for one platoon.

Following this development, battalion III/80 which was on reserve, moved at 23:00 to occupy heights 1597 and 1623, setting the positions captured by the Germans under fire. The Germans remained idle, and did not continue their maneuver. Throughout the night exchange of artillery fire continued, which depleted the Greek ammunition stocks. A total of 50 Greek officers and soldiers were killed during the fighting of 13 April. The commander of the 20th Division had worries about the morale of its units on the pass, and subsequently requested from TSKM to obtain a battalion from Western Macedonia Army Section (TSDM) retreating from Albania. At this day artillery Major and commander of the Greek Alpine Battalion, Ioannis Paparrodou, was killed by enemy fire.

=== 14 April ===
From 04:30 the German artillery began pounding the Greek positions, followed by infantry assault. The Germans attacked from both roads on the eastern exit of the pass, using smoke screens and intense machinegun fire for cover. One attack was directed astride the road and north of the ravine Bisti towards Daouli col, supported by "tanks" (i.e. assault guns), while the other was directed south of the ravine and towards the village of Kleisoura and the height Tzouma Manou.

From their positions on Sargonitsa height, the Germans opened fire on the flank of the Greek 6th Machine-gun battalion defending Daouli col. From 07:00 the Greek artillery stopped its fire due to the depletion of its ammunition. The German armour fired intensely on the Greek positions while there were no anti-tank weapons to counter them. The German Air Force constantly flew over the battlefield causing further demoralization. Beginning at 09:00, the 6th P.MG. battalion's line began to unravel, its machine-guns getting knocked out one by one and elements retreating to the rear. At 10:30, ammunition (2,000 rounds per machine-gun) had been depleted, and the remainder of the battalion surrendered. Battalion I/80 to the south was not attacked in force, however its commander recognizing the danger of encirclement from the north ordered a withdrawal. While withdrawing the battalion was attacked by "tank" fire to the rear from very short range, and its remnants, except the 1st company, surrendered at 10:45.

The commander of the 20th Division tried to reorganize the units west of the pass, sending the artillery to the west to cover the infantry, while using a sapper company and the 20th Reconnaissance Group to block the retreat. However the German artillery and air force scattered the Greek columns and the wave of flight overran the blocking units.

TSKM, taking knowledge of the situation, ordered the 20th Division to counter-attack and retake its lost positions. Such a mission however was beyond the capabilities of the scattered division. With the permission from GHQ, the commander of TSKM (Mj. Gen. Karassos) asked W Force commander, Lt. Gen. Wilson, to commit Brig. Charrington's 1st Armoured Brigade for a counter-attack. Although Wilson gave the order, Charrington interpreted it as a "suggestion" rather an order, and ignored it.

TSKM then sought assistance from TSDM. Karassos asked three battalions of infantry from TSDM, which, combined with as much infantry as the 20th Division could muster as well as its artillery, would counter-attack and recapture the pass. Although agreement was reached, there were not enough transports available to bring the necessary forces from Albania, the closest being the 13th Division around Bilisht. By 20:00 on 14 April, only elements of the I/23 battalion had arrived to the area of the 20th Division, on the saddle of Kastoria, and consequently the counter-attack was never conducted. Instead, the Germans continued their advance, attacking the I/23 battalion and other elements of 13th division the next day, 15 April, in the Battle of Lake Kastoria.

== Aftermath ==
The failure to hold the pass had grave consequences for the Greeks, as the German advance directly threatened the main retreat route of TSDM. Although the Greeks would attempt again to stop the Germans on 15 April east of the road, this time they would fight on open terrain less favourable than the Kleisoura pass.

The Greek casualties were heavy, the 80th Regiment being effectively destroyed. The Germans claimed to have taken 1000 prisoners. The Greek 20th Division pulled the bulk of its 35th Regiment from Vlasti pass (leaving behind one battalion) and concentrated around Smixi, south of 13th Division. For the remainder of the war the division would be a non-combat-worthy formation.
