= Battle of the Metaxas Line =

Battle of the German invasion of Greece in WW2

- Part of the Battle of Greece
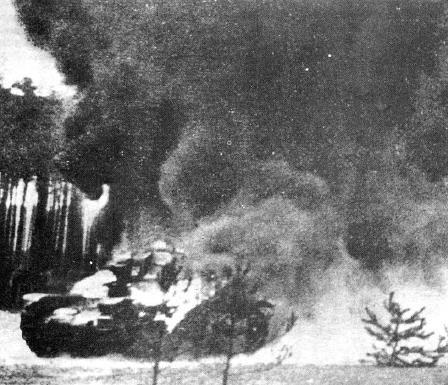
- German tank (captured Char B1) set on fire by Greek artillery, April 1941.
Date	6–9 April 1941
Location	Metaxas Line
Result	German victory

Belligerents
Germany	Greece

Commanders and leaders
(Nazi Germany) Wilhelm List	(Kingdom of Greece) Konstantinos Bakopoulos

Strength
(Nazi Germany) 2nd Panzer Division (Nazi Germany) XVIII Army Corps (Nazi Germany) 6th Mountain Division (Nazi Germany) 5th Mountain Division; 2 armored divisions 5 infantry divisions 2 independent enhanced infantry regiments 650 aircraft	(Kingdom of Greece) Eastern Macedonian Army (Kingdom of Greece) 19th Mechanized Division (Kingdom of Greece) 14th Infantry Division (Kingdom of Greece) 18th Infantry Division; 5 divisions 188 field artillery pieces 76 anti-tank guns 30 anti-aircraft guns 40 tankettes

Casualties and losses
1,400+ killed 192+ missing 2,403+ wounded Total 3,995+ (Note: There is no known complete casualty list for the Germans. XVIII Corps reported 555 killed, 2,134 wounded and ca.170 missing (without the officers). XXX Corps' total casualties are not known, but the 164th Infantry Division suffered 18 killed and 92 wounded and the 50th Infantry Division 26 killed, 22 missing and 177 wounded (plus 4 drowned on 14 April in an accident).)	Unknown

The Battle of the Metaxas Line (German: Kampf um die Metaxas-Linie), also known in Greece as the Battle of the Forts (Greek: Μάχη των Οχυρών), was the first battle of the German invasion of Greece in World War II. The Germans succeeded in capturing several individual forts but failed to breach the fortified Metaxas Line in general.

At the time, the Metaxas line was poorly manned, as most of the Greek Army was involved in the Greco-Italian War on the Albanian front. The 2nd Panzer Division (XVIII Mountain Corps) in an enveloping move crossed the Yugoslavian borders, overcame Yugoslav and Greek resistance and captured Thessaloniki on the 9 April. The capture of Thessaloniki forced the Greek East Macedonia Army Section to surrender on 10 April and the battle of the Metaxas Line was over.

After the battle, German leaders, including Adolf Hitler, as well as ordinary soldiers, expressed profound admiration for the Greek defenders of the Metaxas Line.

== Prelude ==
=== Origins of the campaign ===
The origins of the battle lie in the Italian invasion of Greece, which took place on 28 October 1940. The failure of the Italian Army to bring a favourable end to this Greek-Italian war, forced the Germans to intervene, with an operation they dubbed Operation Marita.

For the purpose of the invasion of Greece, Germany tried to bring Greece's northern neighbours, Bulgaria and Yugoslavia, to the Tripartite Pact alliance. Bulgaria agreed to allow passage of German troops for the attack on Greece, although Bulgarian troops would not participate in combat. Yugoslavia also agreed, but a coup on 27 March by pro-British officers overthrew the pro-Axis Yugoslav government under the regent Prince Paul and installed the 17-year-old Peter II as king. Although the pact was not denounced, Hitler decided to attack Yugoslavia as well as Greece.

=== Metaxas Line ===
The fortification of the area informally known as the Metaxas Line was conceived as a defensive measure against Bulgaria. Bulgaria had refused to sign the Balkan Pact of Greece, Yugoslavia, Turkey and Romania in 1934 which aimed at maintaining the geopolitical status quo in the region following World War I. The Metaxas Line was a series of independent forts along the Greek-Bulgarian border, built on possible routes of invasion. Each fort's garrisons belonged to the division or brigade which controlled the respective border sector. The fortifications were built with the meagre resources that Greece could muster, and exploited at fullest the terrain. Construction had begun in 1936; however, by 1941 the line was still incomplete.

== Opposing forces ==
=== German ===
The German unit detailed for the invasion of Greece was the 12th Army under Generalfeldmarschall Wilhelm List, with a total of 15 divisions and other elements. Of those the XVIII and XXX Corps were to be used against Metaxas Line:

XVIII Mountain Corps (Generalleutnant Franz Böhme)

- 2nd Panzerdivision (Generalleutnant Rudolf Veiel)
- 5th Mountain Division (Generalmajor Julius Ringel)
- 6th Mountain Division (Generalmajor Ferdinand Schörner)
- 72nd Infantry Division (Generalmajor. Philipp Müller-Gebhard)
- independent 125th Infantry Regiment (Col. Erich Petersen)

XXX Corps (General der Infantrie Eugen Ott)

- 50th Infantry Division (Generalmajor Karl Adolf Hollidt)
- 164th Infantry Division (Generalmajor Josef Folttmann)

=== Greek ===
The Greek units responsible for the Metaxas Line were the Eastern Macedonia Army Section under Lieutenant General Konstantinos Bakopoulos and the independent Evros Brigade under Major General Ioannis Zisis

Eastern Macedonia Army Section (Lt. Gen. Konstantinos Bakopoulos)

- Group of Divisions (Lt. Gen. Panagiotis Dedes)
  - 18th Infantry Division (Mj. Gen. Leonidas Stergiopoulos)
    - 70 & 81 & 91 Infantry Regiments (six battalions, five forts, 52 guns)
  - 14th Infantry Division (Major General Konstantinos Papakonstantinou)
    - 41 & 73 Inf.Reg. (total: seven battalions, eight forts, 90 guns)
- 7th Infantry Division (Major General Christos Zoiopoulos)
  - 26 & 71 & 92 Inf. Reg. (10 battalions, six forts, 76 guns)
- Nestos Infantry Brigade (Col. Anastasios Kalis)
  - 37 & 93 Inf.Reg.; (total: five battalions, one fort, 16 guns)
- 19th Mechanized Division (Mj. Gen. Nikolaos Lioumbas)
  - 191 & 192 & 193 Mot.Reg., Krousia Detachment; (total: three tankette battalions, three motorised battalions, two infantry battalions, 36 guns)

West Thrace Zone of operations (Major General Ioannis Zisis)

- Evros Infantry Brigade (Major General Ioannis Zisis)
  - Soufli & Komotini & Pythio border battalions; (total: three battalions, one fort, no guns)

Although it was not a part of the defence of Metaxas Line, the 20th "Bregalnička" Infantry Division, part of the 3rd Territorial Army of the Yugoslav army fought at the same time with the Greeks, confronting the German 2nd Panzerdivision, which would attempt to outflank the entire Greek position crossing into Greece from Yugoslav territory.

- 20th "Bregalnička" Infantry Division (Lt. Gen. Dragutin I. Živanović)
  - 23 Infantry Regiment.
  - 28 Infantry Regiment
  - 49 Infantry Regiment,
  - 20 Artillery Regiment.

== German reactions ==
During and after the battle, Greek soldiers ended up being viewed by the Germans as being more determined, bold, and courageous than any other opponent they had faced up to that point. Adolf Hitler wrote that the Greeks had fought "like the heroes of ancient Hellas" and gave the order to immediately return all soldiers to their families in freedom. In his May 4, 1941 Reichstag speech, he said "only the Greeks, of all the adversaries who confronted us, fought with bold courage and highest disregard of death".

General Wilhelm List was similarly impressed by the bravery and fighting abilities of the Greeks, which led him to order his men to present arms and salute the Greek soldiers as they surrendered. Lieutenant General Franz Böhme, Commander of the XVIII Mountain Corps, also congratulated the Greek commander, stating he was impressed by the valor and heroism displayed by his soldiers and that they "fought marvelously."

German infantry soldier diaries give a similar view of the battle. In particular, one German soldier wrote a highly laudatory description of the Greek defenders and an almost mythical description about a dead Greek soldier in Fort Istimpei:

The Greeks defended themselves with complete self-sacrifice. Their morale remained unshakable, their nerves were of steel. Nowhere, at no time, did they surrender as long as they still had the means to resist. I still remember a dead Greek soldier lying in a trench in front of the barbed wire, far from his bunker. Beside him lay four empty rifles. This was no enemy lying before me... Before my eyes stood a hero whom not even the ancient Greek myths could have portrayed more nobly.

Map of military operations around the forts of the Metaxas Line in the Kato Nevrokopi plateau

Military operations around the forts of the Metaxas Line in the Rupel area

And yet another German soldier wrote an admiring account on the surrender of the 250 Greek defenders of Fort Kelkagia:

Only after we had poured tear gas through the ventilation shafts were they left with no choice but to surrender. They began emerging from the tunnels, their commanding officer at the front, carrying a white flag, followed by the 250 valiant defenders of Kelkagia in a long line: exhausted, their uniforms in tatters, pale, covered in bandages and blood. We stood speechless. Indeed, we were almost ashamed before these men, soldiers like ourselves, who had fought with such prowess, with such tenacity, and with such honor, and who now stood beside us beneath the relentless rain. The triumph of our victory was swallowed by the despair of these proud men.
