= Dodecanese Regiment =

- Σύνταγμα Δωδεκανησίων
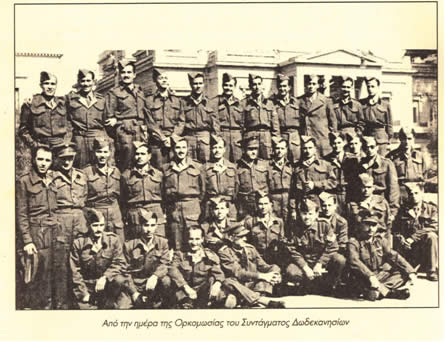
- Photo taken at the swearing-in ceremony of the regiment
- Active: November 1940 – April 1941
- Country: Greece
- Branch: Hellenic Army
- Type: Infantry
- Role: Light Infantry
- Size: 3 Battalions
- Part of: 20th Infantry Division, Central Macedonia Army Section
- March: The Dodecanesian Anthem
- Engagements: Battle of Vevi (1941)

Commanders
- Commander: Reserve Lt. Col. Ioannis Nikolaou

The Dodecanese Regiment or Regiment of the Dodecanesians (Greek: Σύνταγμα Δωδεκανησίων) was an infantry regiment of the Hellenic Army composed to a large extent of volunteers from the Dodecanese Islands and was formed shortly after Greece entered World War II. The islands were under Italian occupation since 1912, and consequently the Dodecanesian Greeks had Italian citizenship, yet they were eager to fight against the Italian Army either in the Dodecanese or on the Albanian Front.

== Formation ==
On October 28, 1940, Italy invaded Greece and the Dodecanesian community in Athens saw it as the best chance to press for the liberation of the Dodecanese Islands. Led by the Dodecanesian Youth organization, the community organized impressive rallies in Athens and at the same time pressed the Greek Government to allow Dodecanesian volunteers with Italian citizenship to enlist in the Hellenic Army. The request was accepted, and on November 13, 1940, the general headquarters issued the order for the formation of the "Dodecanese Regiment". The true reason for this order was that the Albanian Front had absorbed all the reserves, and the GHQ was in a desperate need for additional forces that would counter the impending German offensive from the Bulgarian border.

More than 2,000 Dodecanesian volunteers of all ages, professions and education levels appeared to enlist, but the 1,586 fulfilling the health and age requirements were enough only for a battalion plus a company in full combat strength, some 2,000 less than that required for a regiment, which eventually was brought to strength with men from other islands as well as with navy reservists. The volunteers were trained mainly as riflemen and machine gunners and comprised the vast majority of the regiment's fighting force, leaving the support battalion and combat service support company almost entirely to the other Greeks. These 1,586 Dodecanesian volunteers had Italian citizenship but the Regiment also comprised some Dodecanesians (not volunteers) with Greek citizenship and already serving in the Greek Army. The Regiment's officers were experienced and had seen action in the Macedonian front of World War I and the Asia Minor Campaign but had been involved in the failed 1933 and 1935 pro-Republican coup attempts, and had consequently been dismissed from service; they were reinstated and assigned active duties after the Italian invasion.

At first the enlisted volunteers and the Dodecanesian community believed that their mission would be to liberate their islands, but soon the GHQ made clear that no operation in the Dodecanese had been planned or was possible. The GHQ was firmly convinced that the liberation of the Dodecanese would be a postwar procedure depending on the outcome of the Albanian Front.

After a short but intensive training, the Dodecanese Regiment received the war flag on January 12, 1941. It was the only adequately trained, fully manned, staffed and equipped regiment available as a reserve, and therefore it became the core of the newly formed 20th Infantry Division, which soon was to include the also newly formed but thinly manned 35th and 80th Regiments, comprising low quality reserves.

== Deployment ==
On March 6 the Central Macedonia Army Section (TSKM, Central Macedonian Army in the Allies bibliography) was formed comprising the 12th and 20th Divisions. Its mission was to defend the main body of Greece should the basic defences at Metaxas Line be breached (and provided that Yugoslavia would hold against the German offensive). On March 28 the W Force was formed comprising TSKM and the British Expeditionary Force in Greece, general Wilson was its commander, under the overall command of the Greek commander-in-chief Alexander Papagos. W Force worked intensely and prepared defences in Vermio Position (Mount Voras – Mount Vermio – River Aliakmon).

On April 6 the Germans simultaneously attacked Greece at the Metaxas Line and invaded Yugoslavia. Advancing through Yugoslavia the Germans reached the western end of the Metaxas Line and flanked it, leading to the capitulation of the Greek forces holding it on 8 April. The Germans were now in front of the Vermio Position, and in the next few days they were expected to be also in its rear. If W Force moved to the optimum new defence position, the Germans would be free to advance from Yugoslavia to the rear of the entire Greek Army on the Albanian Front, so W Force had to hastily and insufficiently adjust its left in order to cover the Kleidi Pass. By nightfall on April 9, the Dodecanese Regiment had completed its disposition on its new defence line to the right of Kleidi Pass, where the hill slopes were smooth in the front and steep in the rear. The regiment was now part of the allied Mackay Force assigned the defence of Kleidi Pass and led by Iven Mackay, commander of the Australian 6th Division.

== Battle against the Germans ==
Next day the Leibstandarte SS Adolf Hitler lighter troops advanced rapidly from Yugoslavia towards Kleidi Pass, but their artillery, tanks and heavy vehicles were delayed by demolished bridges and muddy roads. At midnight (April 10 to 11) a strong German reconnaissance attacked Hill 1098 and was repelled by the regiment. On April 11 the Germans made another unsuccessful attack on Delinski Dol Hill.

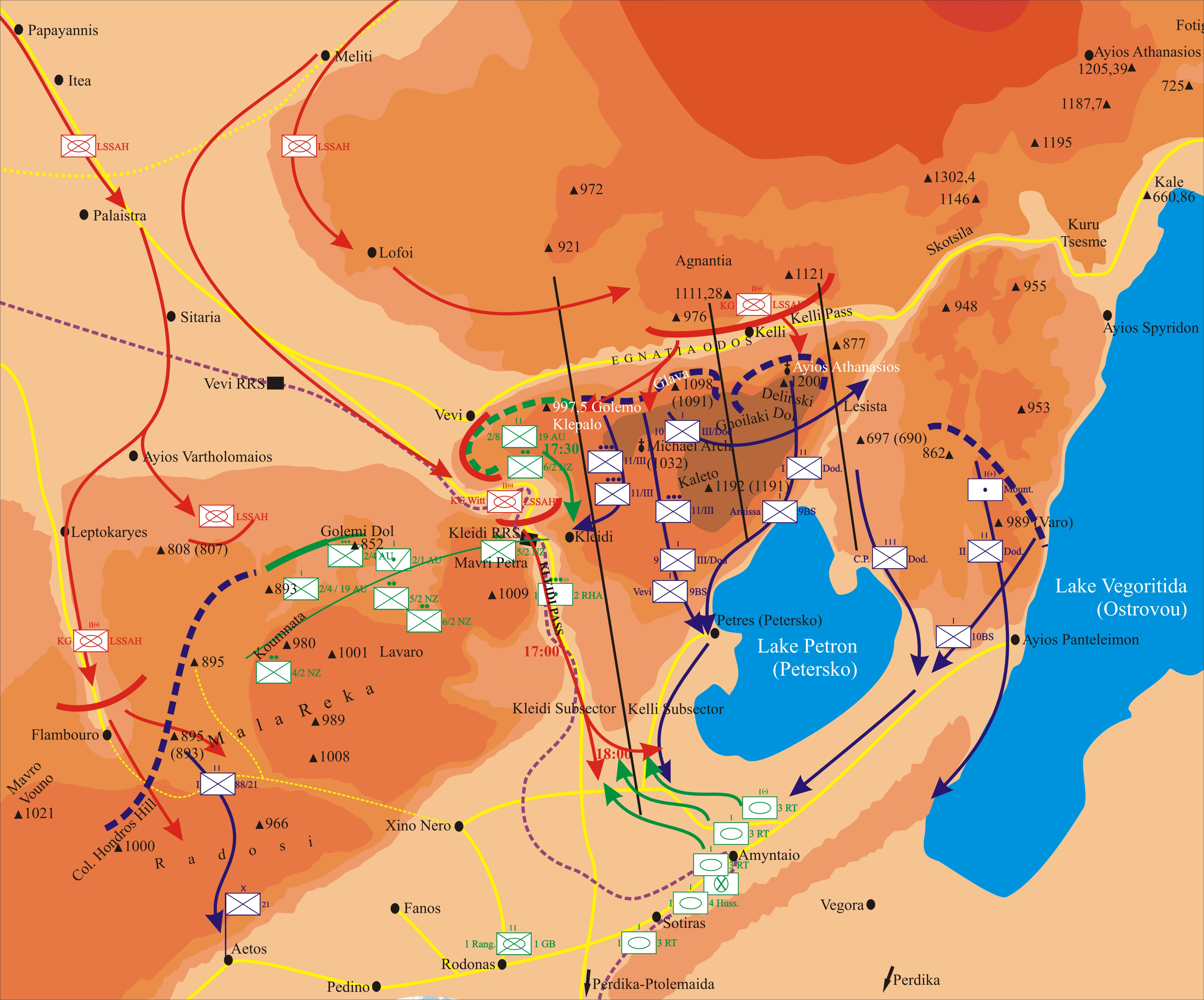
The Battle of Vevi, April 12 16:30 – 18:00. The Allies have fallen back, the Germans advance through Kleidi Pass and shell the retreating Dodecanese Regiment.

By 08:30 on April 12, the first of three LSSAH Kampfgruppe attacked, focusing its main attempt on Hill 997.5 held by the Australian 2/8 Battalion; by 11:00 the British Rangers astride the road in front of the pass withdrew. By noon the Australian 2/4 Battalion on the left had thinned out, the LSSAH had entered Kleidi Pass and 2/8 on the right was under extreme pressure. From 14:00 the Dodecanese Regiment on the right of the Australian 2/8 was under increasingly heavier artillery fire, signifying the preparation for the second Kampfgruppe's attack, and at 15:40 the regiment received the order to withdraw immediately.

According to the initial plan, after the withdrawal (the precise time of which was Mackay's responsibility) the Greek GHQ counted on the Dodecanese Regiment to hold the Kleisoura Pass, the last one before Germans could reach the rear of the Greek Army on the Albanian Front. Unfortunately the Greek liaison at Mackay's HQ ordered the Dodecanese Battalions I and III to march to Kleisoura Pass and Battalion II to be brought by British vehicles to Vlasti Pass. This order made also clear that the withdrawal had to be completed by 18:00 and that the Allied Command would bear no responsibility if the Greeks failed to withdraw in time. Due to the lack of transportation, the mounting German pressure and the order's strict timeframe, the regiment ordered the field battery to destroy their guns on the spot and the battalions had to destroy all materiel unable to be transported by the few available pack animals.

=== The withdrawal ===
The regiment's commander informed his battalion commanders that all three of them were to pass through Amyntaio, that the British had made vehicles available for Battalion II at Amyntaio, but contrary to his instructions he did not wait at the rendezvous point with Battalions I and III to take their lead; instead he kept marching with his staff past it. The Greek military translators with the British vehicles were not informed which of the regiment's men they were to pick up, and to make things worse, as the LSSAH had passed through Kleidi Pass and shelled the withdrawing regiment, Battalion II took a safer route, other than the specified by the withdrawal order, and did not show up at the rendezvous. So the vehicles picked up the wrong men and dispersed them in many cities, some of them deep in the rear. The regiment lost for good most of these men, as it was impossible for them to return, even if they could somehow know where their unit was. Furthermore, the British refused to take on the vehicles the salvaged materiel. That was the coup de grâce for the Dodecanese Regiment's battleworthiness.

By midnight (April 12 to 13) only 800 men and 25 officers, most of them with destroyed boots, had reached Ptolemaida, and they were ordered to march to Pylorio in an attempt to regroup. Kleisoura Pass would now have to resist with whatever reserves had manned it in the previous days. On the 15th the remains of the Dodecanese Regiment, some 1,500 men, most of them unarmed or without ammunition, were ordered to march to Grevena, but on receiving information that Germans had occupied various sites on their route, the commander ordered them to divert further south, on a long and exhausting march without even short rests, under almost constant rain, on ragged and muddy trails. The men had had no food for 4 days, many of them had no boots and had wrapped rags over their frostbites and others were collapsing, unable to keep up with the column's pace.

=== Surrender and disbandment ===
On April 17 the regiment was ordered to turn north to Metsovo; on the 19th they reached Ardomitsa, where they found food and medical care, some clothing, no firearms or ammunition, and were pounded by the enemy air force. On the 20th the commander of the Greek forces on the Albanian front, Lt. General Georgios Tsolakoglou, signed with the LSSAH an unauthorized ceasefire protocol, and next day the regiment was ordered to surrender whatever firearms and ammunition they had to the president of Ardomitsa community and then march to Metsovo. On the 24th they reached Metsovo and received new orders to march to Malakasi. Next day they were informed that by a new ceasefire protocol the Greek officers were considered prisoners of war and the Germans were arresting them on sight. On the 26th, one day before Germans entered Athens, the Dodecanese Regiment's commander succeeded in making contact with the TSKM commander, who confirmed that the Hellenic Army no longer existed and all men were free to return to their homes.

== Sources ==
1. Buckley Christopher, Greece and Crete 1941, Efstathiadis, Athens 1999
2. Επίτομη Ιστορία του Ελληνοϊταλικού και Ελληνογερμανικού Πολέμου 1940-1941 (Επιχειρήσεις Στρατού Ξηράς), 1985, Hellenic Army General Staff, Army History Directorate
3. Karassos Christs, Ο πόλεμος κατά των Γερμανών εν τη κεντρική Μακεδονία 1941, Aetos, Athens 1948.
4. Kay Robin Langford, 27 (Machine Gun) Battalion [Part of The Official History of New Zealand in the Second World War 1939–1945], Historical Publications Branch, 1958, Wellington
5. Kladakis Markos, Ιστορία του Συντάγματος Δωδεκανησίων Εθελοντών, Πολιτιστικό Ίδρυμα Δωδεκανήσου «Κλεόβουλος ο Λίνδιος», Athens 1996.
6. Long Gavin, Greece, Crete and Syria (Australia In The War Of 1939–1945, Series 1 (Army)), Gavin Long, Australian War Memorial, Canberra, 1953
7. McClymont W. G., To Greece [Part of The Official History of New Zealand in the Second World War 1939–1945], W. G. McClymont, War History Branch, Department Of Internal Affairs, 1959, Wellington, New Zealand
8. Nikolaou Ioannis, Έκθεσις πεπραγμένων Συντάγματος κατά διάρκειαν πολέμου 1940-1941, 30 December 1941, as published (pp. 117–136) in «Δωδεκάνησος, η μακρά πορεία προς την ενσωμάτωση», Hellenic Ministry of Foreign Affairs & Kastaniotis Eds, 1996.
9. Nikolopoulos Petros, Ιστορικόν των Επιχειρήσεων της 20ης Μεραρχίας, Chalkis 30 July 1941, Army History Directorate Archive
10. Papagos Alexandros, Ο πόλεμος της Ελλάδος 1940-1941, Οι Φίλοι του Βιβλίου, 1945
11. The German campaign in the Balkans-spring (1941), German Report Series
12. Το Τέλος μιας Εποποιίας, Απρίλιος 1941, Athens 1959, reprint 2009, Hellenic Army General Staff, Army History Directorate
13. Weingartner J, Leibstandarte SS Adolf Hitler 1933-1945, Battery Classics, Nashville
14. Wilson Henry Maitland, Eight Years Overseas, 1939-1947, 1951
