= Georgios Drakos =

Souliote commander and fighter

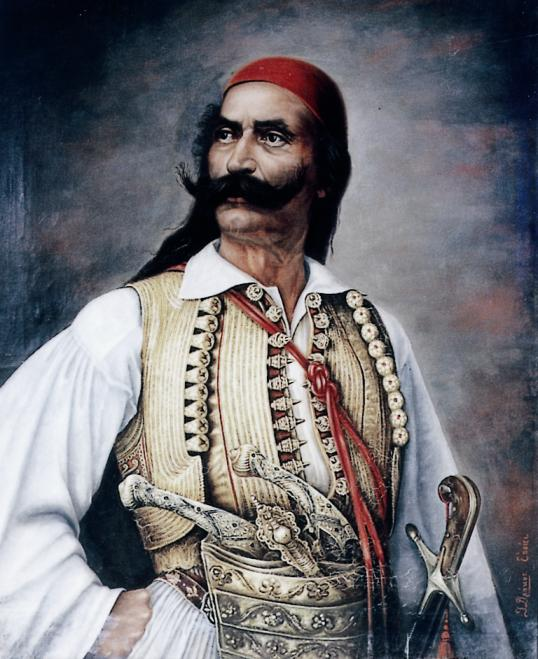
- Georgios Drakos
- Native name: Γεώργιος Δράκος
- Born: c. 1788; Souli, Pashalik of Yanina, Ottoman Empire (now Greece)
- Died: 1827 (aged 39-40) Chalkida, Sanjak of Eğriboz, Ottoman Empire (now Greece)
- Allegiance: (Greece) First Hellenic Republic
- Branch: Hellenic Army
- Conflicts: Greek War of Independence (executed); Battle of Arachova; Battle of Phaleron

Georgios Drakos (Greek: Γεώργιος Δράκος; 1788–1827) was a Souliot chieftain of the Greek War of Independence.

== Biography ==
Drakos was born in Souli in 1788. While the Ottoman Albanian forces were besieging, they attempted to take control of spring from which the Souliotes got water. Certain of victory, they encamped with 6000 soldiers. Georgios Drakos reportedly fought them with a force of only 18 men, and managed to repulse them until Notis Botsaris came with reinforcements, and declared Drakos the hero of the victory.

In the 1821 Battle of Pente Pigadia, Drakos lead a contingent of only 300 men. He also took part in other battles, in Panassari in 1824, in Kolovates in 1825, in the campaign of Karaiskakis in Eastern Greece, as commander-in-chief in the siege of Salona, in Distomo against the Pasha of Karystos and Karofilbei.

He died in Chalkida in 1827. He was a prisoner of Kutahi and was being taken to Euboea to recover, when Kutahi's guards killed him by order and said he committed suicide. His widow Susana and his orphaned children settled in Nafpaktos in 1829, together with the families of Athanasios, Georgios (grandfather and first cousin of the General) and Nikolaos Drakos.

== Bibliography ==
- Γεώργιος Δράκος συνοπτικό βιογραφικό σημείωμα από το Ινστιτούτο Νεοελληνικών Ερευνών
- Κωστής Παλαμάς (1896). Κ. Μάισνερ και Ν. Καργαδούρης (ed.). Η Ελλάς κατά τους Ολυμπιακούς Αγώνας του 1896. Αθήνα: Εκ του Τυπογραφείου της Εστίας.
