= Ioannis Paparrodou =

Greek army commander (1904–1941)

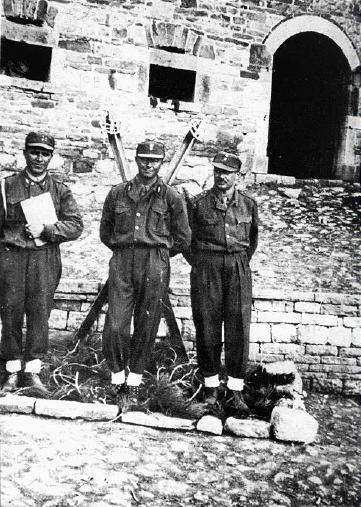
Major Ioannis Paparrodou (middle), in Moscopole.

Ioannis Paparrodou (Greek: Ιωάννης Παπαρρόδου, 1904–1941) was an officer of the Greek Army during World War II.

Paparrodou was born in Lamia, central Greece. In 1923 he graduated from the Evelpidon Military Academy as a Second Lieutenant of the Artillery. After the outbreak of the Greco-Italian War, October 28, 1940, and the successful penetration of the Greek Army deep into Albanian territory, he served as commander of the 21B Mountain Artillery Corps positioned in Pogradec, southern Albania.

Paparrodou was also a winter sports athlete and champion in skiing at the Panhellenic Games of 1935. Because of this experience, Paparrodou became the commander of the first Alpine Battalion of the Greek Army.

In April 1941, when Nazi Germany attacked Greece from the Greek-Bulgarian border, Paparrodou was ordered to defend strategic positions at the Kleisoura pass, near Kastoria, Western Macedonia. At the following battle he resisted against the numerically superior German forces and died on April 13.
