= Kurt Freiherr von Liebenstein =

German general (1899–1975)

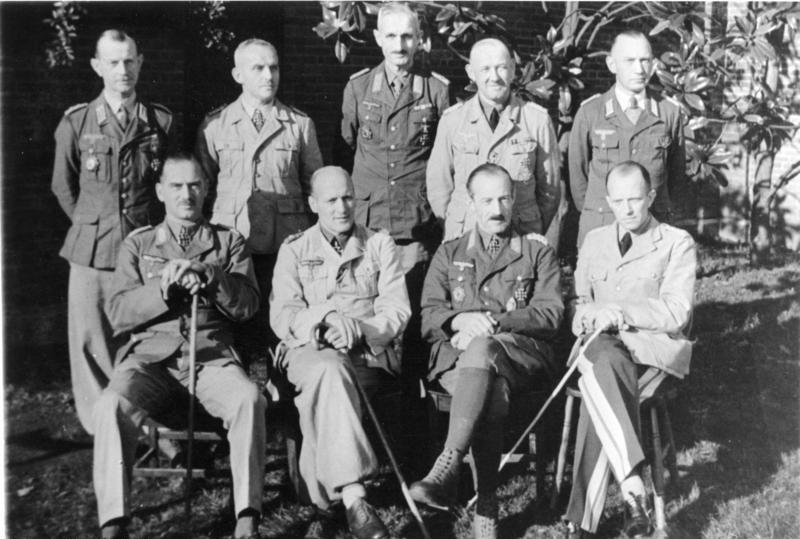
- Liebenstein (front row, 2nd from right) at Trent Park
- Born: 28 February 1899; Horb am Neckar
- Died: 3 August 1975 (aged 76); Jebenhausen
- Military career
- Allegiance: German Empire; Weimar Republic; Nazi Germany; West Germany
- Service years: 1916–1943; 1955–1960
- Rank: Generalmajor
- Commands: 164th Infantry Division
- Conflicts: World War I; World War II; Battle of France; Operation Barbarossa; Battle of Białystok–Minsk; Battle of Kiev (1941); Battle of Moscow; Second Battle of Kharkov; Battle of the Caucasus; Tunisia Campaign
- Awards: Knight's Cross of the Iron Cross; Great Cross of Merit

Kurt Freiherr von Liebenstein (28 February 1899 – 3 August 1975) was a German general during World War II.

On 10 May 1943, he was awarded the Knight's Cross of the Iron Cross. Three days later, while commanding the 164th Infantry Division, he surrendered to the Allied forces in Tunisia. He was sent to Trent Park, a camp for high-ranking commanders north of London. In 1955, he joined the Bundeswehr. In 1960, he retired as Generalmajor.

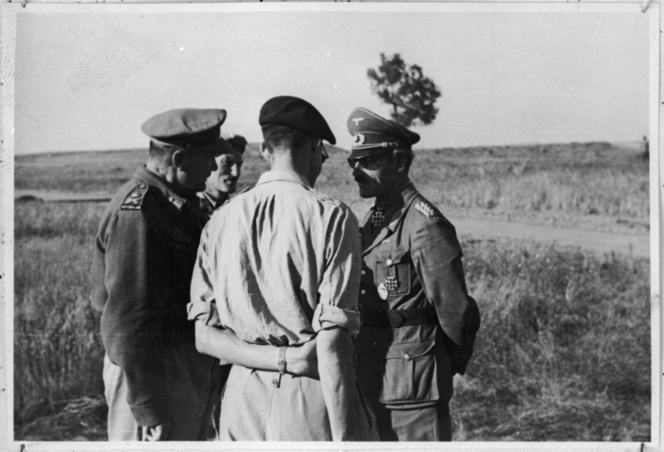
Liebenstein (right) with Lieutenant General Bernard Freyberg (left), commander of the 2nd New Zealand Division, and Brigadier Graham after the surrender of Axis forces in Tunisia

== Awards and decorations ==
- Knight's Cross of the Iron Cross on 10 May 1943 as Generalmajor and commander of 164. Leichte Afrika Division
