= Ioannis Kotoulas =

Greek lieutenant general (1883- 1967)

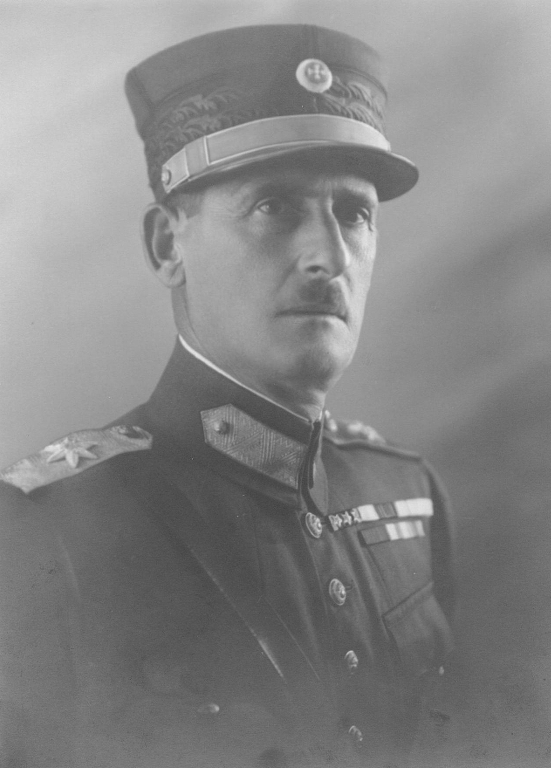
Ioannis Kotoulas as a major general during the Second Hellenic Republic

Ioannis Kotoulas (Greek: Ιωάννης Κωτούλας, 16 May 1883 – 7 December 1967) was a Greek lieutenant general.

Ioannis Kotoulas was born in Gralista (today Ellinopyrgos) in Karditsa Prefecture in 1883. His father was Kostas Ioannou (nicknamed Kotoulas), and his mother Eleni Papargyri. Ioannis was the second of five brothers; a sister, Vasiliki, died at the age of 17.

Kotoulas left his parents' home at the age of 18. He entered the Hellenic Army's NCO School in 1903, and graduated as a second lieutenant in 1909. He fought in the Balkan Wars of 1912–13 in the ranks of the 7th Infantry Regiment, fighting in the battles of Sarantaporo and Bizani, and the capture of Florina. In 1917–18 he fought in the Macedonian front of World War I, as well as in the Allied intervention in Ukraine in 1919, as a battalion commander in the 7th Regiment.

During the Asia Minor Campaign he was a lieutenant colonel and served as chief of staff of the Smyrna Division until October 1920, as well as commanding the 4th, 7th and 14th Infantry Regiments and he particularly distinguished himself during the Greek retreat in August 1922, where he managed to lead his column to safety from Ali Veran to Takmak. In 1923 he was promoted to colonel, and served in the General Staff in 1923–24. In 1925 he was appointed commander of the 2nd Infantry Division, before going for higher studies to France. In 1928 he attended courses at the Artillery Tactical Application School in Athens, and in 1929–1934 he commanded the 12th and 13th infantry divisions. He was appointed commandant of the Superior War School in 1936, and retired with the rank of major general in 1939.

Following the start of the Greco-Italian War in October 1940, he was recalled to active service. He was the only general officer recalled to active service, despite his well-known opposition to the ruling Metaxas Regime. He assumed command of the Thrace Army Section and the newly formed Central Macedonia Army Section (TSKM). He commanded the TSKM, composed of the 12th and 20th divisions, from 6 March to 8 April 1941, when he was replaced by Major General Christos Karassos.

During his career, Ioannis Kotoulas published a number of works on military history, including studies on Xenophon and the Ten Thousand (1929), infantry combat, the Catalan Company in 14th-century Greece, Thessaly in the Trojan War, etc.

He died in 1967. Kotoulas was married in 1923 to Haïdo Boubousi and had a daughter, Eleni.
