= Drakos family =

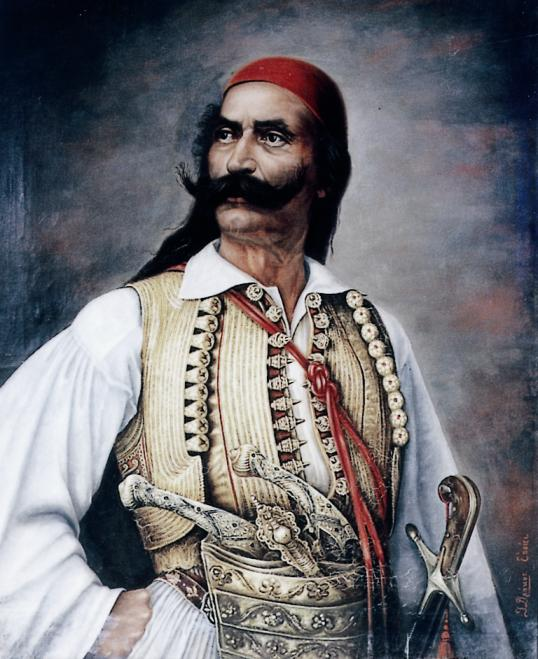
Georgios Drakos (1788–1827) a general in the Greek War of Independence

The Drakos family (Greek: Δράκος) is a Greek family that originated from Epirus. The family name first appeared in the 16th century with the Armatolos Poulios Drakos, in a failed Venetian backed revolt in Arta and Epirus. Later, it would appear alongside the main Souliote clans, and later on in the history of the Greek nation.

== History ==
The early origins of the Drakos family are uncertain but they probably take their name from an early warlord called Poulios Drakos (lit. transl. dragon), who was the progenitor of the family. The original village in which the Drakos family came from was Kamarina-Martanion, which still has families bearing the Drakos surname. After a failed revolt in Epirus, conducted together with Theodoros Bouas-Grivas and Malamos, other Armatoles, the chief branch of the family migrated to Souli where they were hereditary warlords of the Souliotes. Poulios Drakos' descendants remained chieftains of the Souliotes through the following centuries and his descendant Dimos Drakos was a powerful warlord who entered the Russian Army in the run-up to the Orlov Revolt. His son Georgios Drakos was a leading general of the Greek War of Independence in 1821. Georgios' descendants entered the political life of the new Kingdom of Greece and entered into marriage alliances with many other powerful political families like the Botsaris family.

== Notable Members ==
- Georgios Drakos (1788–1827), son of Dimos, Greek general in the War of Independence
- Markos Drakos (1888–1975), Greek Army general
- Nikolaos Drakos (1861–1927), Greek Army colonel and Minister of Military
