= Markos Drakos (general) =

Lieutenant General of the Hellenic Army

- Μάρκος Δράκος
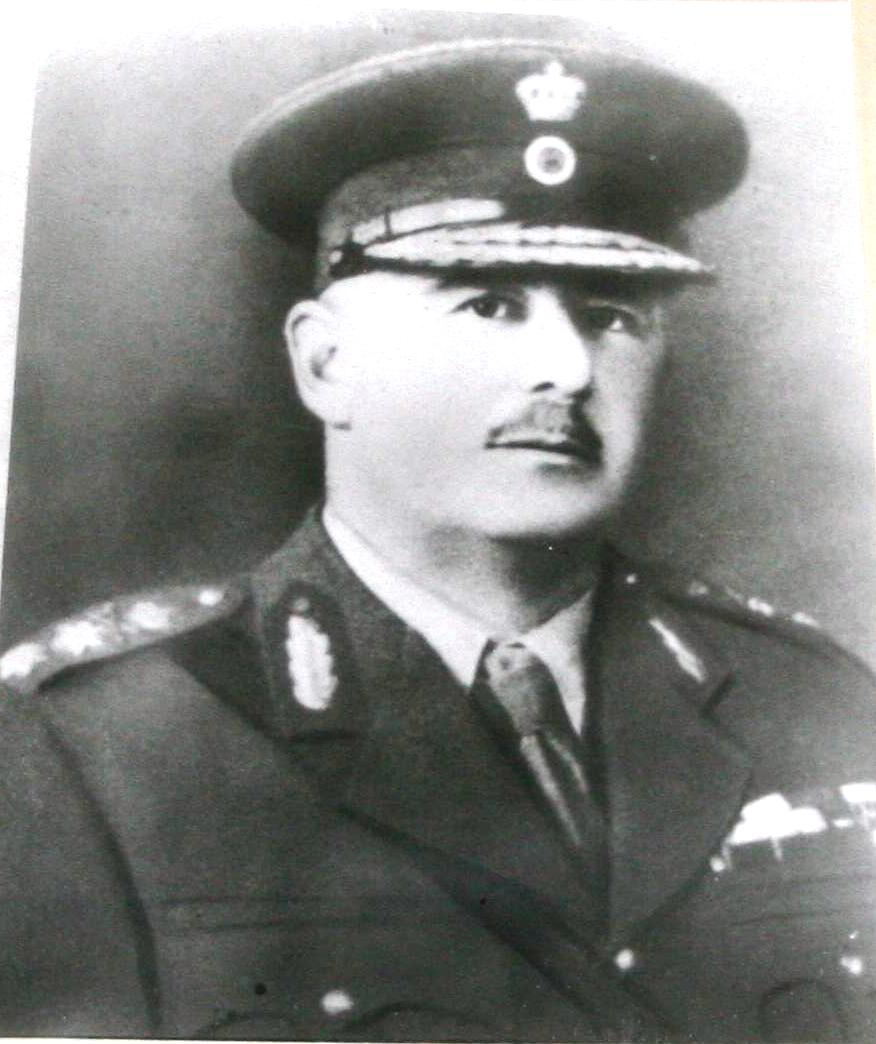
- Markos Drakos c. 1940
- Born: c. 1888; Athens, Kingdom of Greece
- Died: c. 1975
- Education: Hellenic Military Academy; École Militaire
- Military career
- Allegiance: Kingdom of Greece
- Branch: Hellenic Army
- Rank: Lieutenant general
- Commands: Eastern Macedonia Army Section; Epirus Army Section
- Conflicts: Balkan Wars: First Balkan War; Second Balkan War; World War I: Macedonian front; Greco-Turkish War (1919-1922); World War II: Greco-Italian War; Battle of Greece

Markos Drakos (Greek: Μάρκος Δράκος; 1888–1975) was a member of the Drakos family and a lieutenant general in the Hellenic Army most notable for his leadership during the Greco-Italian War of 1940–1941, as commander of the Eastern Macedonia Army Section and of the Epirus Army Section.
