= 18th Infantry Division (Greece) =

18th Infantry Division XVIII Μεραρχία Πεζικού (XVIII ΜΠ)
- Active: 1940–1941
- Country: Kingdom of Greece
- Branch: Hellenic Army
- Type: Infantry
- Size: Division
- Engagements: Battle of the Metaxas Line

The 18th Infantry Division (Greek: XVII Μεραρχία Πεζικού, XVIII ΜΠ; XVIII Merarchia Pezikou, XVIII MP) was an infantry division of the Hellenic Army that fought in the Battle of the Metaxas Line.

The division was formed in December 1940, under Major General Leonidas Stergiopoulos. It was subordinated to the Eastern Macedonia Army Section (TSAM) and faced the German attack on 6 April 1941 in the area of Mount Beles. The division was unable to halt the German attack, which outflanked TSAM and led to its surrender on 9 April.

== Sources ==
- Hellenic Army History Directorate (1997). An Abridged History of the Greek-Italian and Greek-German War, 1940-1941 (Land Operations) (in Greek). Athens: Hellenic Army General Staff, Army History Directorate. ISBN 9789607897015.
