= Ioannis Zisis =

Greek Army general

Major General Ioannis Zisis
- Ιωάννης Ζήσης
- Born: c. 1881; Makri, Phthiotis, Kingdom of Greece
- Died: 9 April 1941; Evros, Kingdom of Greece
- Military career
- Allegiance: Kingdom of Greece; (Greece) Second Hellenic Republic
- Branch: Hellenic Army
- Conflicts: World War II: Battle of Greece; Battle of the Metaxas Line

Ioannis Zisis (Greek: Ιωάννης Ζήσης, 1881–1941) was a Hellenic Army General during World War II.

He was born in village Makri, near to Makrakomi, Fthiotida.

Prior to and during the German invasion of Greece, Major General Zisis was commander of the Evros Brigade (Ταξιαρχία Έβρου) deployed in Western Thrace and consisting of 2,100 men. In the Battle of Metaxas Line (April 6–9, 1941), the numerically and technically superior German Army invaded Greece from the Bulgarian border. However, the Greek fortifications at Nymfaia, near Komotini were able to provide a two-day resistance against enemy attacks.

After the battle, the retreating Greek soldiers in Western Thrace were ordered by their headquarters to move across the Evros river to Turkey. General Zisis found this turn of events too humiliating and preferred to commit suicide, while his soldiers were disarmed and interned by the Turks.
