= Konstantinos Bakopoulos =

Hellenic Army general

Konstantinos Th. Bakopoulos
- Born: c. 1889; Agiorgitika, Arkadia, Kingdom of Greece
- Died: 23 February 1950 (aged 69–70); Paris, France
- Spouse: Titina Christovasili
- Children: Alex Bacopoulos; Dora Bakopoulou
- Military career
- Allegiance: Kingdom of Greece
- Branch: Hellenic Army
- Service years: 1912–1945
- Rank: Lieutenant General; Deputy Minister of the Interior; Minister Governor-General of Crete
- Commands: Eastern Macedonia Army Section
- Conflicts: Balkan Wars; World War II; Balkans campaign; Battle of Greece; Greco-Italian War; Operation Marita; Battle of the Metaxas Line
- Awards: Gold Cross of the Order of the Redeemer; Grand Commander of the Order of the Phoenix (Greece); Grand Cross of the Order of George I; War Cross (Greece); Cross of Valour (Greece); Medal of Outstanding Deeds (Greece)

Konstantinos Th. Bakopoulos (Greek: Κωνσταντίνος Θ. Μπακόπουλος) (1889–1950) was a Greek general in the Hellenic Army who took part in the Balkan Wars (1912–1913), played a crucial conciliatory role in Greek military politics during the 1930s and distinguished himself in the fight against the Nazis during World War II. In 1943 he was imprisoned in German concentration camps until the end of the war in 1945 (with four other generals, including General Alexander Papagos, a future Prime Minister).

== Early life and career ==
K. Th. Bakopoulos (Bacopoulos) was born in 1889 in the village of Agiorgitika, near Tripoli, Province of Arkadia. His parents, Theodoros and Vassiliki, had fourteen children, of whom Konstantinos was the eleventh. His father Theodoros was mayor of Korythion-Mantinias in the Province of Arkadia. His grandfather Nikolaos had also been mayor of the same village. On June 26, 1912, Bakopoulos graduated from the Military Academy as a second lieutenant of the Artillery. By the beginning of World War II, he had attained the rank of lieutenant general and was given command of the Army Section of Eastern Macedonia (TSAM) — then a crucial post for the defense of the nation.

== Before World War II ==
In 1912-3, General Bakopoulos fought in the Balkan Wars. In the mid-1930s, he distinguished himself as an impartial Military Commander of Athens, as follows: after the “1935 officers’ attempted coup d’état” on March 1 (Greek: Κίνημα του 1935), he served as ex-officio Presiding Judge at the Court Martial of the leaders accused of organizing the revolt. Although these officers were found guilty, Bakopoulos was able to contribute to relative unity within the army by resisting heavy political pressure by the monarchists to condemn the accused to death.

The monarchists in command disapproved of this act of clemency but, in time, they did recognize the need for peace in the army. Those were troubled times. On December 7, 1935 Bakopoulos was appointed Minister and Governor General of the Island of Crete in the government of Konstantinos Demertzis (November 30, 1935 – March 13, 1936)- a position he held until March 14, 1936. In the second government of Demertzis (March 14, 1936 – April 13, 1936) Bakopoulos was appointed Deputy Minister of the Interior on March 23, three weeks before the Prime Minister’s sudden death on April 13, 1936. On that same date Ioannis Metaxas received the mandate from King George to form a new government and on April 16 he received a Vote of Confidence from the Parliament with 241 votes for, 16 against and 4 abstentions. Bacopoulos was also appointed Deputy Minister of the Interior in that parliamentary government of Prime Minister I. Metaxas. However, Metaxas (supported by the King) proclaimed a dictatorship on August 4. On August 5, 1936, Bacopoulos resigned from his ministerial post and left the government.

His democratic and conciliatory leadership, as described above and in other politico-military situations, has since been hailed on both sides of the then-highly polarized military/political spectrum of Monarchists vs Republicans (Royalists vs. Venizelists); particularly so, in view of the mounting war clouds in Europe leading to World War II.

== World War II ==
At the beginning of World War II, General Bakopoulos was Commanding Officer of the Eastern Macedonia Army Section (TSAM, Τμήμα Στρατιάς Ανατολικής Μακεδονίας). At that time, he was in charge of the so-called Metaxas Line, a series of about 20 forts along the Greek-Bulgarian border (the Greek analogue of the French Maginot Line; see also Battle of Metaxas Line). He and his men, against all odds, successfully repelled an invading German infantry army (reinforced by the 5th and 6th mountain divisions of the XVIII Mountain Corps) during fierce battles that lasted several days, including the now-renowned battle at Fort Rupel.

The Germans invaded Greece on April 6, 1941, after the collapse of the Greek resistance east of the Axios River. They entered Greece from Yugoslavia which had already been overrun by Hitler’s army. The attack on the Metaxas Line was launched from Bulgaria and was supported by artillery and bomber aircraft. Both Greeks and Germans suffered heavy losses. Meanwhile, the German 2nd Panzer Division (XVIII Mountain Corps) advanced through Yugoslav territory into Greece, headed East, south of the Metaxas Line defenses and captured Thessaloniki on April 9. Thus TSAM was cut off from the mainland. Only then did Bakopoulos negotiate an honourable surrender of his troops (at 13:00 hrs on April 10) in order to save his men and prevent the bombing of the vital port city of Thessaloniki. This surrender was decided after Bakopoulos received authorization from General Alexandros Papagos, Head of the High Military Command in Athens.

The battle of the Metaxas Line together with other acts of resistance against the Italian attempted invasion and the German occupation are celebrated annually with school parades and Greek media coverage. A characteristic assessment of the battle of the Metaxas Line and Fort Rupel, as well as the role of General Bakopoulos to save his men (when defeat was certain) and to prevent the bombing of Thessaloniki is given by Konstantinos I. Despotopoulos, ex president of the Athens/Greek Academy. See also mention by K.I. Despotopoulos of Bakopoulos’ role in “The refusal of submission”.

== At Fort Königstein and Dachau prisons ==
At 5:30 a.m. July 25, 1943 Bakopoulos was arrested by the Gestapo, along with four other top-ranking Greek generals (including Field Marshal Alexander Papagos-later to be Prime Minister, 1952–1955), for planning and organizing military and civilian resistance to the Nazi occupation. They were deported to various concentration camps in Germany (including the Königstein Fortress and Dachau prison), where they were interned for two years as hostages, until their release by the Fifth U.S. Army at the end of the war.

For additional details on Konstantinos Th. Bakopoulos and further insight into Nazi diplomatic and military tactics, consult his book "The Imprisonment of the Five Generals" (Greek: "Η Ομηρία των πέντε αντιστρατήγων") published in Athens in 1948.

The book (although published in 1948) was finished in 1946, the year in which the tragic Greek civil war began (1946–1949), following the devastation of the German occupation (1941–1945). At this critical juncture for polarized Greece, the book ends with a message characteristic of Bakopoulos the man: “I cannot but wish from the heart for Greece to find happiness and for Greeks to be united.” (Greek: “Δεν έχω παρά να ευχηθώ ομοψύχως να ευτυχίσει η Ελλάδα και να ομονοήσουν οι Έλληνες” (p. 332)).

== Honors for his service to Greece ==
For his service to Greece, General Bakopoulos was awarded the highest medal of honour (megalostavros) as well as various other medals of valor, Greek, French and Serbian. A street in Psychiko, Athens now bears his name. He died in Paris in 1950, survived by his wife Titina Christovassili (daughter of the noted Greek poet, writer and M.P. Christos Christovasilis) and his two children, Alexandros (a university mathematician) and Dora (a concert pianist).

== Sources ==
- Archives of the Hellenic Army General Staff/Army History Directorate, Period of WW II, F.629/A/1, Field report of the Army Section of Eastern Macedonia by Lt. General Konstantinos Bakopoulos, from 2/8/1941 to 4/10/1941
- Archives of the Hellenic Army General Staff/Army History Directorate, Period WW II/F.663/A/1a, Field report on the organization and functioning of Fort Rupel by the Infantry Lt. Colonel George Douratsos, August 19, 1941
- Bakopoulos, Konstantinos. Η Ομηρία των πέντε αντιστρατήγων. Athens, 1948
- Depastas, Nikolaos. Αλέξανδρος Παπάγος, 1883–1955: Ο στρατιώτης, ο πολιτικός, ο άνθρωπος. Athens: General Army Editions, 1980
- Despotopoulos, Alexandros. Greece's Contribution to the Outcome of Two World Wars. Athens, Ekdotike Athenon, 1993
- Hellenic Army General Staff/Army History Directorate, The Greek Army during WW II, Battles in Eastern Macedonia and Western Thrace,1941. Athens (1956)
- Ravassopoulos, Thoukidides. The revolt of 1935 (Το κίνημα του 1935). Editions-Συλλογές, Athens, 2005.
- Stassinopoulos, Costas. Modern Greeks : Greece in World War II. The German Occupation and National Resistance American Hellenic Institute Foundation.
- Varouhakis, Antonis. Chania 1898–2008 (Βαρουχάκης, Αντώνης Μυρ. Χανιά 1898–2008). Chania, Mayor of Chania, 2009, pp. 72–3
- “The Vima” (Το Βήμα) newspaper article, Sunday 4 October 1998, pp. 2–3
- “Kathimerini – 7 imeres” (Καθημερινή – 7 ημέρες) newspaper article, Sunday 7 April 2002, special issue, pp. 1–20
- Cartier Raymond, La Seconde Guerre Mondiale, Vol.I, 1939–42, French and European Pubs, Inc.,1965.
- Churchill, Winston, The Second World War (6vols), Houghton Mifflin Co., Boston: 1948–53.
- Churchill, Winston, (Speech to British Parliament), April 24, 1941.
- Despotopoulos, Konstantinos. Hellenics, pp. 74–81. Papazisis Pubs, Athens, 1998.
- Despotopoulos, Konstantinos. Anapoliseis, pp. 18–40. Papazisis Pubs, Athens, 2005.
- Despotopoulos, Konstantinos. The Refusal of Submission, Special Edition, p. 4–5, KAHTIMERINI, March 8, 2011.
- Papagos Alexandros, The Battle of Greece, 1940–41, J.M. Scazikis "Alpha" Editions, 1949.
- Papagos Alexandros, The German attack on Greece, Greek Office of Information (1946).
- Safaris, Stefanos, ELAS, Athens 1946, Reprint, pp. 26, 1999.
- Terzakis, Angelos, Hellenic Epopeya (Epic) 1940–41, Hellenic Army General Staff, 2nd edition,1990.
- Varouhakis, Antonis., Chania 1898–2008, Konstantinos Bakopoulos, pp. 72–73. (Βαρουχάκης, Αντώνης, Χανιά 1898–2008). Chania Municipality, Crete. 2009.
- Zolotas Anastassios, “The second NO”, ESTIA, «Το Δεύτερο ΟΧΙ», ΕΣΤΙΑ, April 9, 2010.
