= 164th Infantry Division (Wehrmacht) =

Division

- 164. Infanterie-Division
- Divisional insignia
- Active: November 1939 – May 1943
- Country: Nazi Germany
- Branch: Army
- Type: Infantry
- Role: Desert warfare
- Size: Division

The 164th Infantry Division (German: 164. Infanterie-Division) was an infantry division of the German Army during World War II. Formed in November 1939, the division took part in the invasion of Greece in April 1941. In January 1942, consolidating the Axis seizure of the island during the Battle of Crete, the 164th was reorganized as Fortress Division Kreta (FDK). In mid-1942 the division was transferred to North Africa and re-designated as 164th Light Africa Division (German: Leichte Afrika Division), also alternatively spelt 164th Light Afrika Division in some anglophone literature. It surrendered in May 1943 in Tunisia at the end of the North African Campaign.

== Operational history ==
The 164th Infantry Division was formed on 27 November 1939 with Oberst (Note: The rank of oberst is equivalent to that of colonel in the United States Army.) Konrad Haase as its commander. Stationed at Dresden, Wehrkreis IV, by January 1940, it included three infantry regiments and Haase had been promoted to generalmajor (Note: The rank of generalmajor is equivalent to that of brigadier general in the United States Army.) on 1 January 1940. It was held in reserve during the Battle of France and was later involved in the invasion of Greece in April 1941. After the end of the campaign, it was stationed in Salonika on occupation duty. During this time, one of its infantry regiments was detached to serve on the Greek island of Rhodes.

In early 1942, the division was moved to the island of Crete and organised as Fortress Division Kreta. Reinforced with the experienced 125th Infantry Regiment, it remained here until mid-1942 at which time it was transferred to North Africa to serve with the Panzer Armee Afrika. It was now designated as the 164th Light Afrika Division; each of its regiments only had two battalions. The division fought at El Alamein and performed well. During the battle, one of its regiments was instrumental in preventing the capture of the headquarters of Panzer Armee Afrika by advancing Allied infantry. Along with the remainder of the Axis forces, the division gradually retreated into Tunisia. It spent the final stages of the campaign in Tunisia fighting against Free French troops as part of the 1st Italian Army. Liebenstein, the division's final commander, surrendered to Lieutenant General Bernard Freyberg, commander of the 2nd New Zealand Division.

== Commanding officers ==
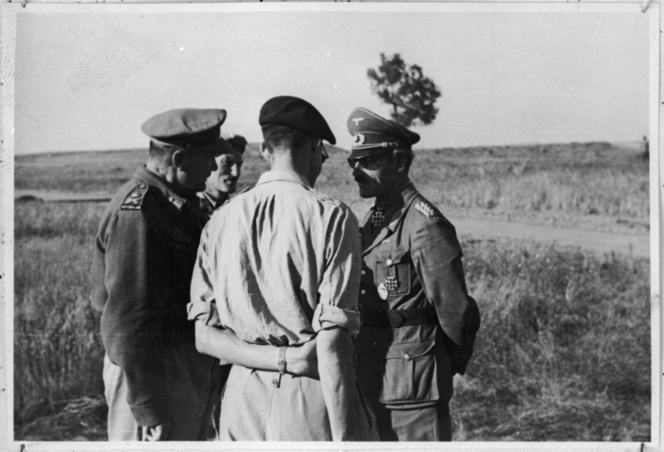
Generalmajor Kurt von Liebenstein (right) with Lieutenant General Bernard Freyberg (left), commander of the 2nd New Zealand Division, and Brigadier Graham after the surrender of Axis forces in Tunisia

The following officers commanded the 164th Infantry Division during the course of World War II:

- Generalmajor Konrad Haase, 1 December 1939 – 9 January 1940;
- Generalleutnant (Note: The rank of generalleutnant is equivalent to that of major general in the United States Army.) Josef Folttmann, 10 January 1940 – 9 August 1942;
- Generalmajor Carl-Hans Lungershausen, 10 August – 30 November 1942; 30 December 1942 – 14 January 1943;
- Oberst Siegfried Westphal, 1–29 December 1942;
- Generalmajor Kurt Freiherr von Liebenstein, 15 – 16 January 1943; 13 March – 12 May 1943;
- Oberst Becker, 16 January – 16 February 1943;
- Generalmajor Fritz Krause, 17 February – 12 March 1943.

== See also ==
- Fortress Crete

== Notes ==
Footnotes

Citations
