= Pylorio =

Pylorio Πυλώριο
- Community
- Location within Greece
- Coordinates: 40°16.265′N 21°23.05′E
- Country: Greece
- Administrative region: Western Macedonia
- Regional unit: Kozani
- Municipality: Voio
- Municipal unit: Neapoli
- Elevation: 660 m (2,170 ft)

Population (2021)
  - Community: 43
- Time zone: UTC+2 (EET)
  - Summer (DST): UTC+3 (EEST)
- Postal code: 500 01
- Area code: +30-2468
- Vehicle registration: ΚΖ

Pylorio (Greek: Πυλώριο) is a village and a community of the Voio municipality. Before the 2011 local government reform it was part of the municipality of Neapoli, of which it was a municipal district. The 2021 census recorded 43 inhabitants in the village.

Pylorio was populated by Greek speaking Muslim Vallahades. The 1920 Greek census recorded 317 people in the village, and 350 inhabitants (60 families) were Muslim in 1923. Following the Greek–Turkish population exchange, Greek refugee families in Pylorio were from Asia Minor (10) and Pontus (41) in 1926. The 1928 Greek census recorded 208 village inhabitants. In 1928, the refugee families numbered 50 (184 people).
