= Eastern Macedonia Army Section =

Greek field army during WW2

The Eastern Macedonia Army Section (Greek: Τμήμα Στρατιάς Ανατολικής Μακεδονίας, ΤΣΑΜ; Tmima Stratias Anatolikis Makedonias, TSAM) was a field army of the Hellenic Army in World War II. It faced the initial German attack on Greece during the Battle of the Metaxas Line, and was forced to capitulate after four days of fighting on 9 April 1941.

== History ==
Pre-war Greek planning focused on a possible conflict with Bulgaria in Macedonia and Western Thrace. For the defence of eastern Macedonia, the plans foresaw the creation of a Kavala Army Section (Τμήμα Στρατιάς Καβάλας), headquartered at Kavala and composed of a Group of Divisions (Ομάς Μεραρχιών) in the Axios River area, comprising 6th and 17th Infantry Divisions and the Hellenic Army's sole Cavalry Division, as well as of the IV Army Corps (7th and 14th Divisions, 7th and 14th Brigades) in the area of Kavala.

Following the Italian attack on Greece on 28 October 1940, Kavala Army Section was mobilized, under the command of Lt. General Markos Drakos, but was renamed as the Eastern Macedonia Army Section in early November.

== Leadership ==
=== Commanders ===
- Lt. General Markos Drakos (28 October 1940 – 7 February 1941)
- Lt. General Konstantinos Bakopoulos (7 February – 9 April 1941)

=== Chiefs of staff ===
- Col. Kleanthis Boulalas (28 October – 19 December 1940)
- Col. Theodoros Grigoropoulos (19 December 1940 – 7 February 1941)
- Col. Panagiotis Kalogeropoulos (7 February – 9 April 1941)

=== Headquarters ===
- Serres (28 October 1940)
- Thessaloniki (8 February 1941)

== Sources ==
- Hellenic Army History Directorate (1997). An Abridged History of the Greek-Italian and Greek-German War, 1940-1941 (Land Operations) (in Greek). Athens: Hellenic Army General Staff, Army History Directorate. ISBN 9789607897015.
