= 14th Infantry Division (Greece) =

14th Infantry Division XIV Μεραρχία Πεζικού (XIV ΜΠ)
- Active: 1913–1916; 1918–1922; 1939–1941
- Country: Kingdom of Greece
- Branch: Hellenic Army
- Type: Infantry
- Size: Division
- Engagements: Vardar Offensive, Battle of the Metaxas Line

The 14th Infantry Division (Greek: XIV Μεραρχία Πεζικού, XIV ΜΠ; XIV Merarchia Pezikou, XIV MP) was an infantry division of the Hellenic Army.

The 14th Infantry Division was established in December 1913, during the reorganization of the Hellenic Army that followed the Balkan Wars. Its headquarters was at Kalamata in the Peloponnese, comprising the 9th and 36th infantry regiments, as well as the 1/14 Cretan Regiment at Chania. The division formed part of the Patras-based II Army Corps. As a result of the National Schism, the division was disbanded in 1916.

The division was reformed in 1918 as part of the reconstituted II Corps, but only served during the final weeks of the war, in the pursuit of the Bulgarian forces around Strumitsa, under the disposal of XVI British Corps. During the Greco-Turkish War of 1919–1922, the division, reduced in strength to c. 5,000 men, formed part of the Army of Thrace and did not see any combat, being responsible for covering the Greek–Yugoslav, and later the Greek–Bulgarian, borders.

In the interwar period, due to the reduction in the size of the army, the division was disbanded, until the December 1939 changes to the mobilization plan, which re-established the 14th Division at Xanthi, in northern Greece, under IV Army Corps. During the Greco-Italian War of 1940–41, the 14th Division remained uninvolved, forming part of the Eastern Macedonia Army Section (TSAM) covering the Metaxas Line on the border with Bulgaria. In the Battle of the Metaxas Line, TSAM was outflanked and forced to capitulate during the German invasion of Greece in April 1941.

== Sources ==
- Η ιστορία του Πεζικού (Στρατιωτικός Κανονισμός 900-21) [History of the Infantry (Military Regulation 900-21)] (PDF) (in Greek). Athens: Hellenic Army Infantry Directorate/3a. 2014.
