= 7th Mechanized Infantry Brigade (Greece) =

7th Mechanized Infantry Brigade "SARANTAPOROS"
- 7η Μηχανοκίνητη Ταξιαρχία Πεζικού "ΣΑΡΑΝΤΑΠΟΡΟΣ"
- Emblem of the 7th Mechanized Infantry Brigade
- Country: Greece
- Branch: Hellenic Army
- Type: mechanized infantry
- Size: Brigade
- Part of: 12th Mechanized Infantry Division
- Garrison/HQ: Provatonas, Western Thrace
- Motto: I will not give away my country smaller (Oύκ ελλάττω παραδώσω)

The 7th Mechanized Infantry Brigade "Sarantaporos" (Greek: 7η Μηχανοκίνητη Ταξιαρχία Πεζικού «Σαρανταπορος», 7η M/K ΤΑΞ) was a mechanized infantry brigade of the Hellenic Army, headquartered in Provatonas, Western Thrace and subordinated to the 12th Mechanized Infantry Division, until disbanded in 2025. The brigade was merged with the 50th Mechanized Infantry Brigade based at Soufli in Evros.

== Structure ==
7th Mechanized Infantry Brigade "Sarantaporos"

- HQ Company (ΙΣΤ)
- 7th Signal Company (7 ΛΔΒ)
- 7th Engineer Company (7 ΛΜΧ)
- 7th Armored Battalion (7 ΕΜΑ)
- 561st Mechanized Infantry Battalion (561 M/K ΤΠ)
- 641st Mechanized Infantry Battalion (641 M/K ΤΠ)
- 642nd Mechanized Infantry Battalion (642 M/K ΤΠ)
- 131st Self Propelled Artillery Battalion (131 Μ Α/K ΠΒ)
- 7th Antitank Company (7 ΛΑΤ)
- 7th Support Battalion (7 ΤΥΠ)
