= Central Macedonia Army Section =

WWII command of the Hellenic Army

The Central Macedonia Army Section (Greek: Τμήμα Στρατιάς Κεντρικής Μακεδονίας, ΤΣΚΜ, Tmima Stratias Kentrikis Makedonias, TSKM) was an army corps-level command of the Hellenic Army established on 6 March 1941. It was commanded by Lt. General Ioannis Kotoulas and comprised the 12th Infantry Division and the 20th Infantry Division. On 28 March it was assigned to Henry Maitland Wilson's 'W' Force, holding the Vermion Mountains–Haliacmon line. It was defeated and dissolved in mid-April 1941 during the German invasion of Greece.

== Order of battle (6 April 1941) ==
- 20th Infantry Division (Maj. General Christos Karassos)
- 12th Infantry Division (Col. Georgios Karambatos)
- 10th Frontier Sector (Col. of the Reserve Aristotelis Sergios)
- Field Artillery Battalion
- 150mm Skoda Howitzer Battalion
- 85mm Artillery Battery
- Anti-Aircraft Artillery Battalion
- Support units

== Leadership ==
=== Commanders ===
- Lt. General of the Reserve, Ioannis Kotoulas (6 March – 8 April 1941)
- Maj. General Christos Karassos (8–20 April 1941)

=== Chiefs of staff ===
- Col. Antonios Peppas (3–19 March 1941)
- Col. Konstantinos Papadopoulos (19 March – 20 April 1941)

=== Headquarters ===
- Kozani (6 March 1941)
- Perdikkas (9 April 1941)
- Kivotos (14 April 1941)
- Ioannina (16 April 1941)
- Metsovo (18 April 1941)

== Sources ==
- Hellenic Army History Directorate (1997). An Abridged History of the Greek-Italian and Greek-German War, 1940-1941 (Land Operations). Athens: Hellenic Army General Staff, Army History Directorate. ISBN 9789607897015.
- Koliopoulos, Ioannis S. (1976–1977). "Η στρατιωτική και πολιτική κρίση στην Ελλάδα τον Απρίλιο του 1941" [The Military and Political Crisis in Greece in April 1941] (PDF). Μνήμων (in Greek). 6: 53–74. doi:10.12681/mnimon.174.
