= 20th Infantry Division (Greece) =

20th Infantry Division 20ή Μεραρχία Πεζικού
- Active: 24 January – 14 April 1941
- Country: Greece
- Branch: Hellenic Army
- Type: Infantry
- Part of: Central Macedonia Army Section
- Engagements: Battle of Greece

The 20th Infantry Division (Greek: 20ή Μεραρχία Πεζικού) was a short-lived formation of the Hellenic Army. It was founded on 24 January 1941, when Greece was already embroiled in the Greco-Italian War.

== History ==
The division was formed in late February, near Florina, at a time when most available manpower and equipment were already employed in the Greco-Italian War. Consequently, according to its first commander, Major General Karassos, it was "Formed in haste and in offhand manner...from two infantry regiments, without artillery, with officers mostly drawn from the reserves, personnel of every possible origin and type with a large proportion of completely or partially untrained men, with inferior armament, with many deficiencies in communications equipment, arms, men and above all pack animals", it was from the outset of "insufficient cohesion, reduced numerical strength and morale, and greatly reduced fighting ability".

It was assigned to the Central Macedonia Army Section (TSKM), forming part of the Greek–British "W Force", under the British Lt. General Henry Maitland Wilson, assigned to hold the Aliakmon River–Mount Vermion line against the expected German invasion of Greece. The division defeated and practically ceased to exist as a combat formation at the Battle of Kleisoura Pass on 13–14 April.

== Order of battle ==
As of early April 1941, before the German attack:

- 35th Infantry Regiment (Reserve Col. Emmanouil Marinakis)
- 80th Infantry Regiment (Lt. Col. Vasileios Matzouranis)
- Dodecanese Regiment (Reserve Lt. Col. Ioannis Nikolaou)
- X Frontier Sector (Reserve Col. Aristotelis Sergos)
- 20th Mountain Artillery Regiment (Lt. Col. Christos Delivogiatzis)

== Commanders ==
- Major General Christos Karassos (24 January – 8 April 1941, appointed to command TSKM)
- Colonel Miltiadis Papakonstantinou (8–14 April 1941)

== Sources ==
- Το τέλος μιας εποποιΐας, Απρίλιος 1941 [The end of an epopee, April 1941] (in Greek). Athens: Hellenic Army General Staff / Army History Directorate. 1959.
- Koliopoulos, Ioannis S. (1976–1977). "Η στρατιωτική και πολιτική κρίση στην Ελλάδα τον Απρίλιο του 1941" [The Military and Political Crisis in Greece in April 1941] (PDF). Μνήμων (in Greek). 6: 53–74. doi:10.12681/mnimon.174.
