= Giuseppe Anfora di Licignano =

Italian diplomat (1828–1894)

Giuseppe Anfora di Licignano (September 26, 1828 in Naples - December 19, 1894) was an Italian diplomat.

== Life ==
Giuseppe Anfora di Licignano born in 1828 by Elisabetta Gagllani and Raffaele Anfora di Licignano. On May 3, 1853, he married Giovanna Luisa Paternò.

On October 22, 1858 he received exequatur as Consul General of the Kingdom of the Two Sicilies in New York City and was from September 24, 1860 to December 15, 1861 chargé d'affaires of the Kingdom of the Two Sicilies in Washington. In 1868 he resided as chargé d'affaires of the Kingdom of Italy in Guatemala City and at the same time was chargé d'affaires in San José, Costa Rica.

From 1883 to 1892, he was Envoy extraordinary and Ministre plénipotentiaire in Buenos Aires and Montevideo and from September 25, 1892 to November 29, 1894 he was Envoy extraordinary and Ministre plénipotentiaire in Asunción.

== See also ==
- Ministry of Foreign Affairs (Italy)
- Foreign relations of Italy

Preceded by -	Italian ambassador to Guatemala; 1868–1911	Succeeded by Giosuè Notari
Preceded by Gustavo Enrico Perrod	Italian ambassador to Uruguay; 1883–1892	Succeeded by Pietro Antonelli
Preceded by Enrico della Croce di Doyola	Italian ambassador to Argentina; 1883–1892	Succeeded by Obizzo Malaspina di Carbonara
Preceded by Pasquale Massone	Italian ambassador to Paraguay; 1892–1894	Succeeded by Pietro Antonelli
