= List of ambassadors of Italy to Guatemala =

Coordinates: 14.582353°N 90.516361°W

Ambassador of Italy to Guatemala
- Incumbent; Edoardo Pucci since June 13, 2016
- Inaugural holder: Gamalero William Mario
- Formation: January 1, 1927

The Italian ambassador to Guatemala City is the official representative of the Government in Rome to the Government of Guatemala.

== List of representatives ==
Diplomatic accreditation	Ambassador	Observations	List of prime ministers of Italy	President of Guatemala	Term end
January 1, 1868	Giuseppe Anfora di Licignano	Chargé d'affaires	Luigi Federico Menabrea	Vicente Cerna y Cerna	
September 13, 1911	Giosuè Notari	ministro residente en Guatemala City also in Tegucigalpa accredited (* June 19, 1859 in Capriglia Irpina; † March 25, 1928 in Rome)	Giovanni Giolitti	Manuel Estrada Cabrera	
January 1, 1927	Gamalero William Mario	Consul (representative)]	Benito Mussolini	Lázaro Chacón González	
1930	Carlos Federico Novella Kleé	Consul (representative), Chargé d'affaires (*April 6, 1871 April 3, 1948) In 1902 he founded la fábrica de Cementos C.F. Novella y Cía.. He lays at Guatemala City General Cemetery.	Benito Mussolini	Jorge Ubico	October 27, 1932
October 27, 1932	Emanuele Grazzi	Chargé d'affaires	Benito Mussolini	Jorge Ubico	1934
April 6, 1937	Enrico Bombieri (1887-1967)	(* in Rovereto on December 21, 1887) He was sent an extraordinary and minister plenipotentiary of Italy in the republics of Salvador, Guatemala and Honduras, Accredited the 6th April, 1937. Residence, Guatemala.: He was previously Consul General in Tunis for several years. He is considered one of the best Italian connoisseurs of conditions in Tunisia.; From 1946 to 1948 he was minister plenipotentiary to the Legation of Italy in the Hague.	Benito Mussolini	José María Reina Andrade	
June 1, 1947	Gamalero William Mario		Ferruccio Parri	Juan José Arévalo	
January 1, 1960	Aloisi de Laderel, Baron Folco (Comte di Al lumière)	(Born in Paris, on June 2, 1907 married to Maria Aloisi de Larderel.	Fernando Tambroni	Miguel Ydígoras Fuentes	
January 1, 1966	Giovanni Iannuzzi		Giovanni Leone	Julio César Méndez Montenegro	
September 1969	Emilio Savorgnan		Mariano Rumor	Julio César Méndez Montenegro	April 1973
April 16, 1973	Fabrizio Pediconi	Ambasciatore d'Ita lia a Guatemala	Mariano Rumor	Carlos Arana Osorio	
February 26, 1981	Joseph Nitti		Giovanni Spadolini	Fernando Romeo Lucas García	
February 6, 1984	Giuseppe Avitable	(*1921)	Bettino Craxi	Óscar Humberto Mejía Víctores	
July 23, 1986	Francesco Marcello Ruggirello		Bettino Craxi	Vinicio Cerezo	
March 14, 1992	Umberto Zamboni di Salerano		Giulio Andreotti	Jorge Serrano Elías	
June 28, 1997	Alessandro Serafini	(*Apr. 7, 1936 in Rome) Presented Credentials: Oct. 25, 1993 in Manila	Romano Prodi	Álvaro Arzú	September 17, 2001
September 17, 2001	Pietro Porcarelli		Silvio Berlusconi	Alfonso Portillo	January 1, 2006
March 4, 2006	Pio Luigi Teodorani Fabbri Pozzo		Silvio Berlusconi	Álvaro Colom Caballeros	
August 29, 2008	Mainardo Benardelli de Leitenburg	(*18 dicembre 1964 2013), 48 anni, è morto per cause naturali, la scorsa notte.	Silvio Berlusconi	Álvaro Colom Caballeros	
June 13, 2016	Edoardo Pucci	(nato a Prato nel 1972)	Mario Monti	Otto Pérez Molina	
