= Greco-Italian War =

1940–1941 conflict

- Part of the Balkans campaign of World War II
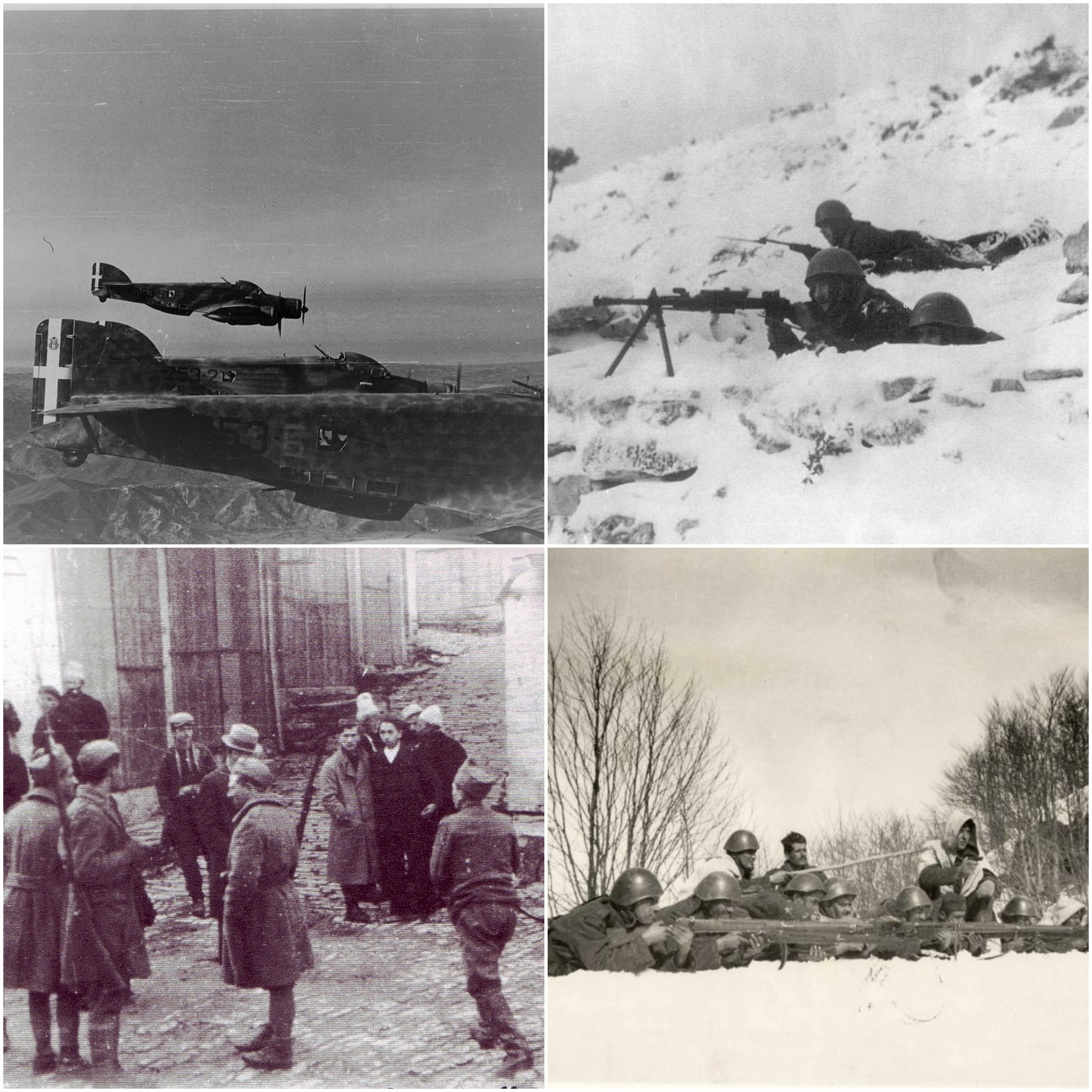
- Clockwise: Italian bombers over Greek territory, Italian soldiers during winter in Albania, Greek soldiers in Gjirokaster, Greek soldiers during the Italian spring offensive
Date	28 October 1940 (Note: Italian invasion of Greece) – 23 April 1941 or 1 June 1941 (Note: Greek armed forces signed an armistice with Italy and Germany on 23 April 1941, but the fighting between Axis and Greek forces continued until the end of the Battle of Crete.) (7 months and 4 days)
Location	Greece and Southern Albania
Result	See Aftermath section
Territorial changes	Occupation of Greece by Italy, Germany, and Bulgaria

Belligerents
Axis: Italy; Albania (Note: Greece and Albania are still de jure at war. The Greek parliament has never officially abolished the law of war enacted in 1940. Despite a 1987 decision to repeal it, ratification is pending.); Germany (from 6 April 1941)	Allies: Greece; United Kingdom (air and material support)

Commanders and leaders
(Kingdom of Italy) Victor Emmanuel III; (Kingdom of Italy) Benito Mussolini; (Kingdom of Italy) Pietro Badoglio; (Kingdom of Italy) Ugo Cavallero; (Kingdom of Italy) Sebastiano Prasca; (Kingdom of Italy) Ubaldo Soddu; (Kingdom of Italy) Carlo Geloso; (Fascist Italy) Alessandro Pirzio Biroli; (Kingdom of Italy) Giovanni Messe (Note: See Greek invasion of Albania (1941)); (Kingdom of Albania in personal union with Italy) Shefqet Vërlaci; (Kingdom of Albania in personal union with Italy) Aqif Përmeti; (Nazi Germany) Wilhelm List	(Kingdom of Greece) George II; (Kingdom of Greece) Ioannis Metaxas #; (Kingdom of Greece) Alexandros Koryzis †; (Kingdom of Greece) Emmanouil Tsouderos; (Kingdom of Greece) Alexandros Papagos; (Kingdom of Greece) Georgios Tsolakoglou (surrendered); (Kingdom of Greece) Ioannis Pitsikas (POW); (United Kingdom) John D'Albiac

Strength
October: 6 divisions of 12 regiments; 87,000 troops; 463 aircraft; 163 light tanks; 686 artillery pieces; November: 10 divisions of 20 regiments; December: 17 divisions of 34 regiments; January: 25 divisions of 50 regiments; 272,463 troops; 7,563 vehicles; 32,871 animals; April: 29 divisions of 58 regiments; 400,000 troops; 9,000 vehicles; 50,000 animals (Note: While Greek divisions were larger in terms of men, both Italian and Greek divisions had nine batteries of artillery per division)	October: 4 divisions of 12 regiments; 50,000 troops; 300 aircraft of which 160 operational (fighters); 940 artillery pieces; 270 anti-aircraft; 459,650 rifles; 17,032 machine guns; 315 mortar artillery; 600 military vehicles; November: 7 divisions of 21 regiments; December: 13 divisions of 39 regiments; January: 13 divisions of 39 regiments

Casualties and losses
13,755 killed; 50,874 wounded; 3,914 missing; 21,153 POW; Total combat losses: 89,696; 12,368 frostbite cases; 52,108 sick; 64 aircraft (another 24 claimed); 1 submarine; 30,000 long tons of shipping; General total: 102,064	13,325 killed; 42,485 wounded; 1,237 missing; 1,531 POW; Total combat losses: 58,578; ? sick; c. 25,000 frostbite cases; 52–77 aircraft; 1 submarine; General total: 83,578+

The Greco-Italian War, also called the Italo-Greek War, took place between Italy and Greece from 28 October 1940 to 23 April 1941. This conflict began the Balkans campaign of World War II between the Axis powers and the Allies, and eventually turned into the Battle of Greece with British and German involvement. On 10 June 1940, Italy declared war on France and the United Kingdom. By September 1940, the Italians had invaded France, British Somaliland and Egypt. This was followed by a hostile press campaign in Italy against Greece, accused of being a British ally. A number of provocations culminated in the sinking of the Greek light cruiser Elli by the Italians on 15 August. On 28 October, Mussolini issued an ultimatum to Greece demanding the cession of Greek territory, which the Prime Minister of Greece, Ioannis Metaxas, rejected.

Italy's invasion of Greece, launched with the divisions of the Royal Army based in Italian-controlled Albania, badly armed and poorly commanded, resulted in a setback: the Italian forces encountered unexpectedly tenacious resistance by the Hellenic Army and penetrated only a few kilometers into Greek territory and had to contend with the mountainous and muddy terrain on the Albanian–Greek border. With British air and material support, the Greeks stopped the Italian invasion just inside Greek territory by mid-November and subsequently counter-attacked with the bulk of their mobilized army to push the Italians back into Albania – an advance which culminated in the Capture of Klisura Pass in January 1941, a few dozen kilometers inside the Albanian border. The defeat of the Italian invasion and the Greek counter-offensive of 1940 have been called the "first Axis setback of the entire war" by Mark Mazower.

The front stabilized in February 1941, by which time the Italians had reinforced the Albanian front to 28 divisions against the Greeks' 14 divisions (though Greek divisions were larger). In March, the Italians conducted the unsuccessful spring offensive. At this point, losses were mutually costly, but the Greeks had far less ability than the Italians to replenish their losses in both men and material, and they were dangerously low on ammunition and other supplies. They also lacked the ability to rotate out their men and equipment, unlike the Italians. On the other side the Italian equipment proved to be of poor quality and of little use, while Italian morale remained low throughout the campaign.

Adolf Hitler decided that the increased British intervention in the conflict represented a threat to Germany's rear, (Note: Hitler was originally content to simply let the Italians wear the Greeks down and (he predicted) finish the war in the summer of 1941) while German build-up in the Balkans accelerated after Bulgaria joined the Axis on 1 March 1941. British ground forces began arriving in Greece the next day. This caused Hitler to come to the aid of his Axis ally. On 6 April, the Germans invaded northern Greece ("Operation Marita"). The Greeks had deployed the vast majority of their men into a mutually costly stalemate with the Italians on the Albanian front, leaving the fortified Metaxas Line with only a third of its authorized strength. Greek and British forces in northern Greece were overwhelmed and the Germans advanced rapidly west and south. In Albania, the Greek army made a belated withdrawal to avoid being cut off by the Germans but was followed up by the Italians. Greece surrendered to German troops on 20 April 1941 and to the Italians on 23 April. (Note: Greece originally surrendered to the Germans under the condition that they would not have to surrender to the Italian troops; this condition was agreed to but later revoked as Mussolini issued protests. The armistice was signed by General Tsolakoglou for Greece, General Ferrero for Italy, and General Jodl for Germany.) Greece was subsequently occupied by Bulgarian, German and Italian troops. The Italian army suffered 102,064 combat casualties (with 13,755 dead and 3,900 missing) and 50,000 wounded; the Greeks suffered over 83,500 combat casualties (including 13,325 killed and 1,200 missing) and 42,000 wounded.

== Background ==
=== Italian imperialism ===
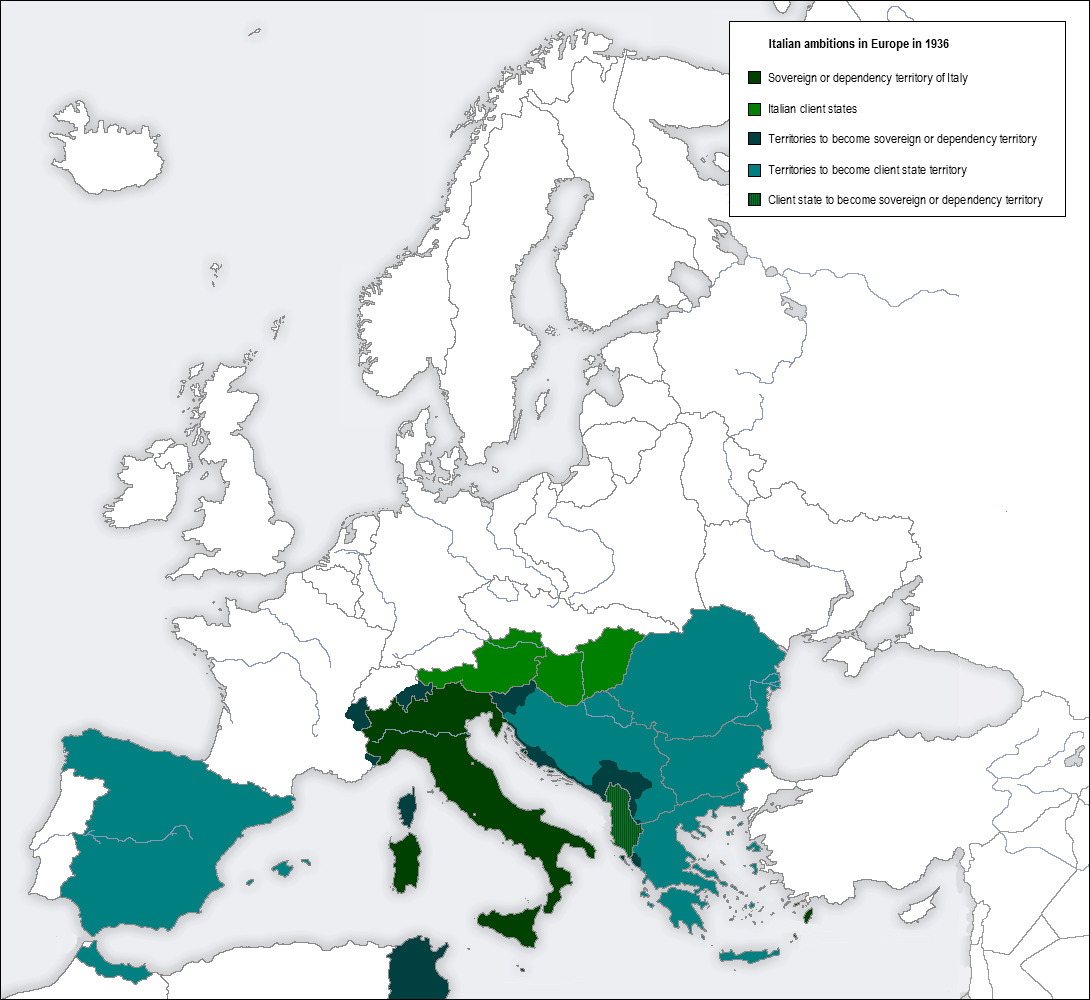
Ambitions of Fascist Italy in Europe in 1936. Legend: Metropolitan Italy and dependent territories; Client states; Claimed territories to be annexed; Territories to be transformed into client states. Albania, which was a client state, was considered a territory to be annexed.

In the late 1920s, Italian Prime Minister Benito Mussolini said that Fascist Italy needed Spazio vitale, an outlet for its surplus population and that it would be in the best interests of other countries to aid in the expansion of Imperial Italy. The regime wanted hegemony in the Mediterranean–Danubian–Balkan region and Mussolini imagined the conquest "of an empire stretching from the Strait of Gibraltar to the Strait of Hormuz".

There were designs for a protectorate over the Albanian Kingdom and for the annexation of Dalmatia and economic and military control of the Kingdom of Yugoslavia and the Kingdom of Greece. The fascist regime also sought to establish protectorates over the First Austrian Republic, the Kingdom of Hungary, the Kingdom of Romania and the Kingdom of Bulgaria, which lay on the periphery of an Italian European sphere of influence.

In 1935, Italy began the Second Italo-Ethiopian War to expand the empire; a more aggressive Italian foreign policy which "exposed [the] vulnerabilities" of the British and French and created an opportunity the Fascist regime needed to realize its imperial goals. In 1936, the Spanish Civil War began and Italy made a military contribution so vast that it played a decisive role in the victory of the rebel forces of Francisco Franco. "A full-scale external war" was fought for Spanish subservience to the Italian Empire to place Italy on a war footing and to create "a warrior culture".

In September 1938, the Italian army had made plans to invade Albania, which began on 7 April 1939, and in three days had occupied most of the country. Albania was a territory that Italy could acquire for "living space to ease its overpopulation" as well as a foothold for expansion in the Balkans. Italy invaded France in June 1940, followed by their invasion of Egypt in September. A plan to invade Yugoslavia was drawn up, but postponed due to opposition from Nazi Germany and a lack of Italian army transport.

=== Greek–Italian relations in the interwar period ===
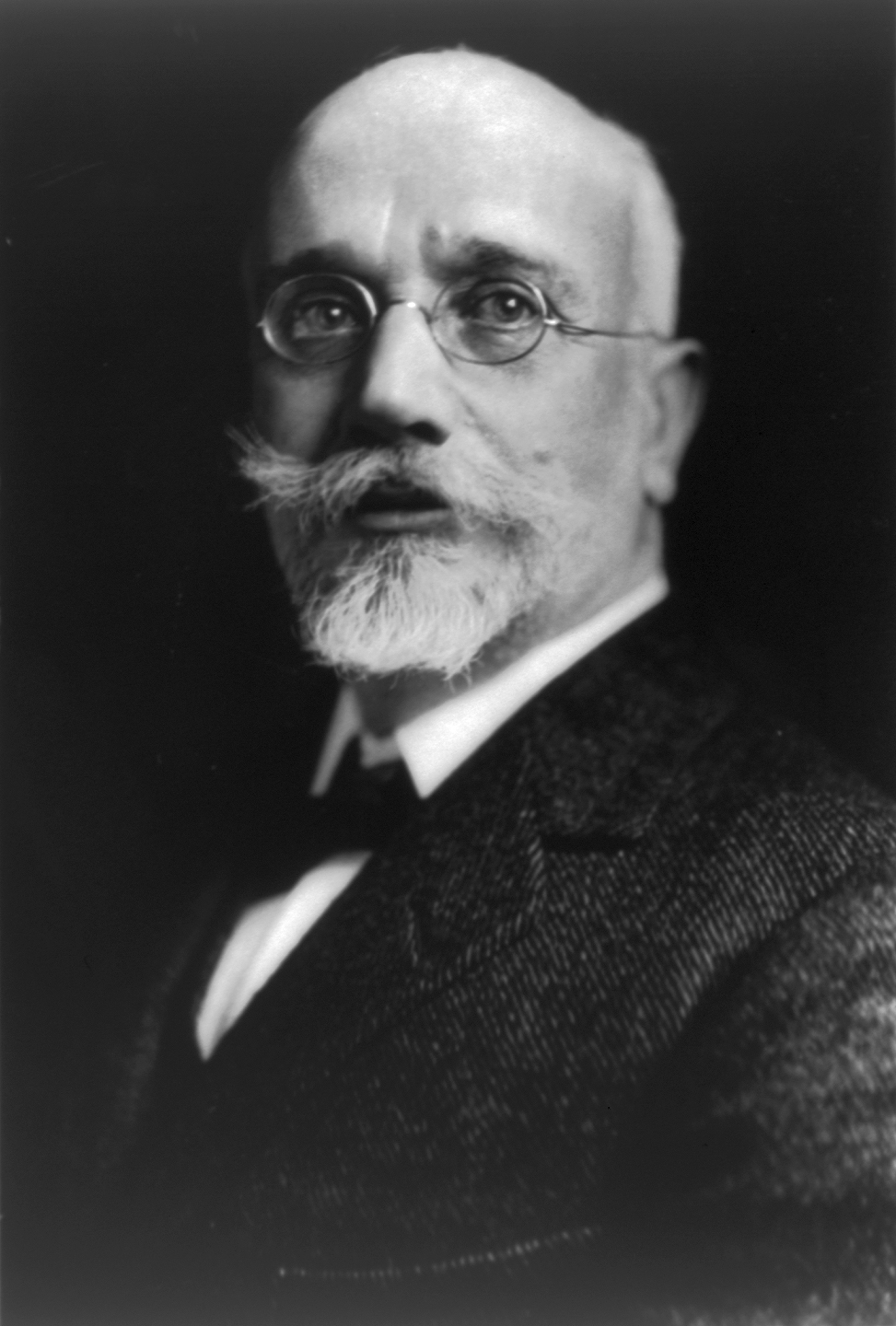
Eleftherios Venizelos, Prime Minister of Greece (various terms 1910–1933)

Italy had captured the predominantly Greek-inhabited Dodecanese Islands in the Aegean Sea from the Ottoman Empire in the Italo-Turkish War of 1912. It had occupied them since, after reneging on the 1919 Venizelos–Tittoni agreement to cede them to Greece. When the Italians found that Greece had been promised land in Anatolia at the Paris Peace Conference, 1919, for aid in the defeat of the Ottoman Empire during the First World War, the Italian delegation withdrew from the conference for several months. Italy occupied parts of Anatolia which threatened the Greek occupation zone and the city of Smyrna. Greek troops were landed and the Greco-Turkish War (1919–22) began with Greek troops advanced into Anatolia. Turkish forces eventually defeated the Greeks and with Italian aid, recovered the lost territory, including Smyrna. In 1923, Mussolini used the murder of an Italian general on the Greco-Albanian border as a pretext to bombard and temporarily occupy Corfu, the most important of the Ionian Islands.

The Greek defeat in Anatolia and the signing of the Treaty of Lausanne (1923) ended the expansionist Megali Idea. Henceforth Greek foreign policy was largely aimed at preserving the status quo. Territorial claims to Northern Epirus (southern Albania), the Italian-ruled Dodecanese, and British-ruled Cyprus remained open but inactive in view of the country's weakness and isolation. The main threat Greece faced was from Bulgaria, which claimed Greece's northern territories. The years after 1923 were marked by almost complete diplomatic isolation and unresolved disputes with practically every neighbouring country. The dictatorship of Theodoros Pangalos in 1925–26 sought to revise the Treaty of Lausanne by a war with Turkey. To this end, Pangalos sought Italian diplomatic support, as Italy still had ambitions in Anatolia, but in the event, nothing came of his overtures to Mussolini. After the fall of Pangalos and the restoration of relative political stability in 1926, efforts were undertaken to normalize relations with Turkey, Yugoslavia, Albania and Romania, without much success at first. The same period saw Greece draw closer to Britain and away from France, exacerbated by a dispute over the two sides' financial claims from World War I.

The Greek government put renewed emphasis on improving relations with Italy and in November 1926, a trade agreement was signed between the two states. Initiated and energetically pursued by Andreas Michalakopoulos, the Italian–Greek rapprochement had a positive impact on Greek relations with Romania and Turkey and after 1928 was continued by the new government of Eleftherios Venizelos. This policy culminated with the signing of a treaty of friendship on 23 September 1928. Mussolini exploited this treaty, as it aided in his efforts to diplomatically isolate Yugoslavia from potential Balkan allies. An offer of alliance between the two countries was rebuffed by Venizelos but during the talks Mussolini personally offered "to guarantee Greek sovereignty" on Macedonia and assured Venizelos that in case of an external attack on Thessaloniki by Yugoslavia, Italy would join Greece.

During the late 1920s and early 1930s, Mussolini sought diplomatically to create "an Italian-dominated Balkan bloc that would link Turkey, Greece, Bulgaria, and Hungary". Venizelos countered the policy with diplomatic agreements among Greek neighbours and established an "annual Balkan conference ... to study questions of common interest, particularly of an economic nature, with the ultimate aim of establishing some kind of regional union". This increased diplomatic relations and by 1934 was resistant to "all forms of territorial revisionism". Venizelos adroitly maintained a principle of "open diplomacy" and was careful not to alienate traditional Greek patrons in Britain and France. The Greco-Italian friendship agreement ended Greek diplomatic isolation and led to a series of bilateral agreements, most notably the Greco-Turkish Friendship Convention in 1930. This process culminated in the signature of the Balkan Pact between Greece, Yugoslavia, Turkey and Romania, which was a counter to Bulgarian revisionism.

The Second Italo-Ethiopian War marked a renewal of Italian expansionism, and began a period where Greece increasingly sought a firm British commitment for its security. Although Britain offered guarantees to Greece (as well as Turkey and Yugoslavia) for the duration of the Ethiopian crisis, it was unwilling to commit itself further so as to avoid limiting its freedom of manoeuvre vis-à-vis Italy. Furthermore, with the (British-backed) restoration of the Greek monarchy in 1935 in the person of the anglophile King George II, Britain had secured its dominant influence in the country. This did not change after the establishment of the dictatorial 4th of August Regime of Ioannis Metaxas in 1936. Although imitating the Fascist regime in Italy in its ideology and outward appearance, the regime lacked a mass popular base, and its main pillar was the King, who commanded the allegiance of the army. Greek foreign policy thus remained aligned with that of Britain, despite the parallel ever-growing economic penetration of the country by Nazi Germany. Metaxas himself, although an ardent Germanophile in World War I, followed this line, and after the Munich Conference in October 1938 suggested a British–Greek alliance to the British ambassador, arguing that Greece "should prepare for the eventuality of a war between Great Britain and Italy, which sooner or later Greece would find itself drawn into". Loath to be embroiled in a possible Greek–Bulgarian war, dismissive of Greece's military ability, and disliking the regime, the British rebuffed the offer.

=== Prelude to war, 1939–40 ===
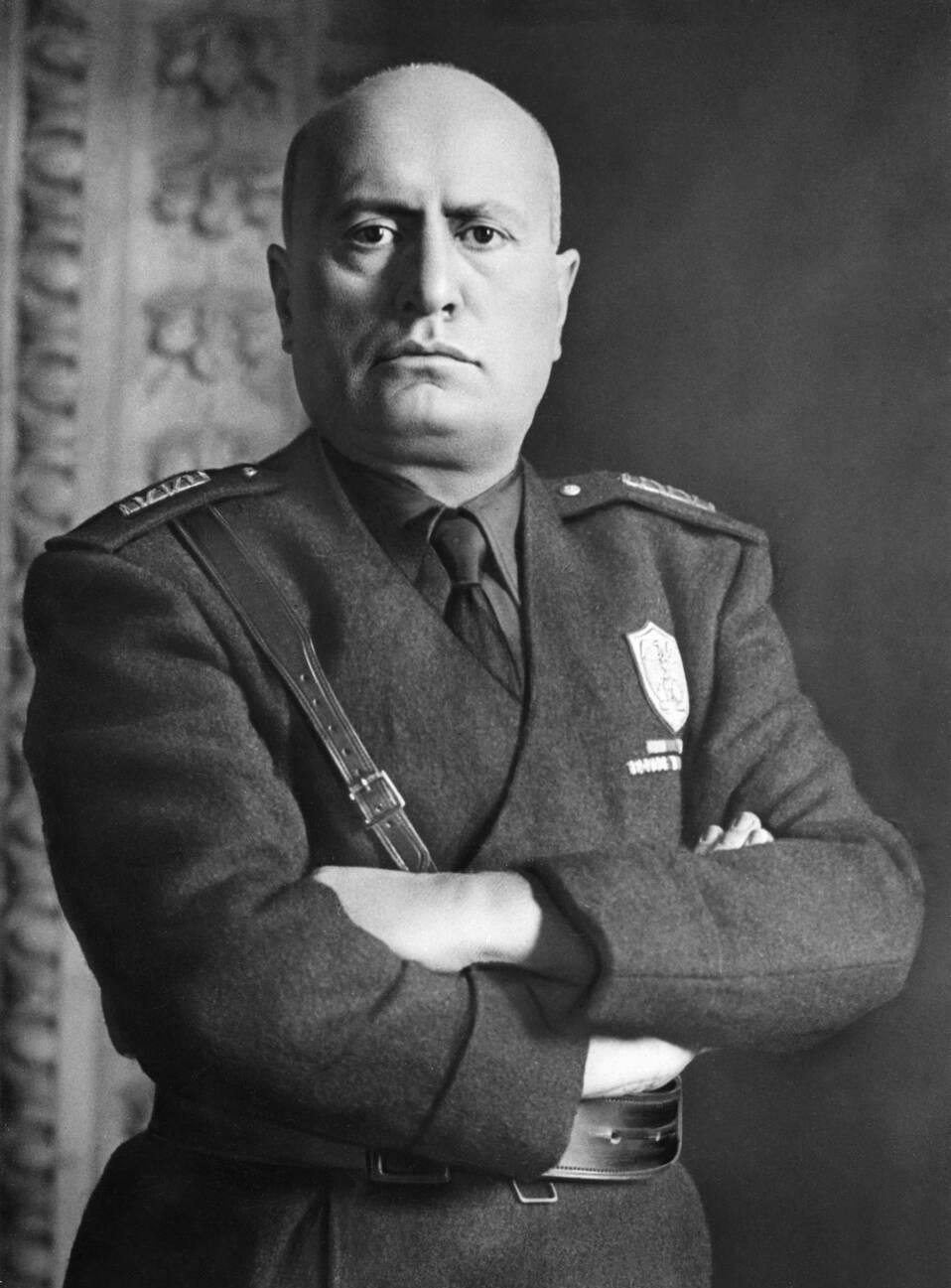
Benito Mussolini, Prime Minister of Italy

On 4 February 1939, Mussolini addressed the Fascist Grand Council on foreign policy. The speech outlined Mussolini's belief that Italy was being imprisoned by France and the United Kingdom and what territory would be needed to break free. During this speech, Mussolini declared Greece to be a "vital [enemy] of Italy and its expansion." On 18 March, as signs for an imminent Italian invasion of Albania as well as a possible attack on Corfu mounted, Metaxas wrote in his diary of his determination to resist any Italian attack.

Following the Italian invasion of Albania in April, relations between Italy and Greece deteriorated rapidly. The Greeks began making defensive preparations for an Italian attack, while the Italians began improving infrastructure in Albania to facilitate troop movements. The new Italian ambassador, Emanuele Grazzi, arrived in Athens later in April. During his tenure, Grazzi worked earnestly for the improvement of Italian–Greek relations, something that Metaxas too desired—despite his anglophile stance, Grazzi considered him "the only real friend Italy could claim in Greece"—but he was in the awkward position of being ignorant of his country's actual policy towards Greece: he had arrived with no instructions whatsoever, and was constantly left out of the loop thereafter, frequently receiving no replies to his dispatches. Tensions mounted as a result of a continued anti-Greek campaign in the Italian press, combined with provocative Italian actions. Thus during Foreign Minister Galeazzo Ciano's visit to Albania, posters supporting Albanian irredentism in Chameria were publicly displayed; the governor of the Italian Dodecanese, Cesare Maria De Vecchi, closed the remaining Greek communal schools in the province, and Italian troops were heard singing "Andremo nell'Egeo, prenderemo pure il Pireo. E, se tutto va bene, prenderemo anche Aténe." ("We go to the Aegean, and will take even Piraeus. And if all goes well, we will take Athens too."). Four of the five Italian divisions in Albania moved towards the Greek border, and on 16 August the Italian Chief of the General Staff, Marshal Pietro Badoglio, received orders to begin planning for an attack on Greece. On 4 August, Metaxas had ordered Greek forces to a state of readiness and a partial mobilization.

The entire road-building programme has been directed towards the Greek border. And this is by order of the Duce, who is thinking more and more of attacking Greece at the first opportunity.

— Entry in Ciano's diary for 12 May 1939

Although both Britain and France publicly guaranteed the independence of Greece and Romania on 13 April 1939, the British still refused to be drawn into concrete undertakings towards Greece, as they hoped to entice Mussolini to remain neutral in the coming conflict with Germany, and saw in a potential Greek alliance only a drain on their own resources. With British encouragement, Metaxas made diplomatic overtures to Italy in August, and on 12 September, Mussolini wrote to Metaxas, assuring him that if he entered the war, Italy would respect Greek neutrality, and that Italian troops based in Albania would be pulled back about 30 kilometres (20 miles) from the Greek border. The Italian dictator even instructed Grazzi, to express his trust towards Metaxas and offer to sell Greece aircraft. On 20 September, the Italians offered to formalize relations by renewing the 1928 treaty. Metaxas rejected this, as the British Foreign Office was opposed to a formal commitment by Greece to Italy, and made only a public declaration of friendship and good-will. Greek–Italian relations entered a friendly phase that lasted until spring 1940.

In May 1940, as Italian entry into the war became imminent, the Italian press began an anti-Greek propaganda campaign, accusing the country of being a foreign puppet and tolerating British warships in its waters. Following the defeat of France, Greek–Italian relations deteriorated further. From 18 June, De Vecchi sent a series of protests to Rome, reporting on the presence of British warships in Crete and other Greek islands and claimed that a British base had been established at Milos. The allegations were overblown but not entirely unjustified: in January 1940, bowing to British pressure, Greece concluded a trade agreement with Britain, limiting its exports to Germany and allowing Britain to use the large Greek merchant fleet for its war effort, marking Greece a tacit member of the anti-Axis camp, despite its official neutrality. British warships did sail deep into the Aegean, leading the British ambassador in Athens to recommend, on 17 August, that the government put a stop to them. Mussolini saw his war as a guerra parallela ("parallel war") under which Italy would finally conquer its spazio vitale allied to Germany, but without the help of Germany since until early 1941 he remained vehemently opposed to the Wehrmacht operating in the Mediterranean. As such, he wanted Italy to occupy all the territory that he saw as part of Italy's spazio vitale, including in the Balkans, before Germany won the expected victory over Britain. The consistent German opposition to any Italian move into the Balkans was a major irritant to Mussolini as he saw it as a German attempt to block Italy from getting its fair share of the spoils before the war was won. In July 1940, Mussolini was forced under German pressure to cancel a planned invasion of Yugoslavia (an important source of raw materials for the Reich), which was frustrating to him as he long had designs on Yugoslav territory.

Italian military forces harassed Greek forces with air attacks on Greek naval vessels at sea. On 12 July, while attacking a British petrol carrier off Crete, Italian aircraft based in the Dodecanese went on to bombard Greek warships in harbour at Kissamos. On 31 July Italian bombers attacked two Greek destroyers in the Gulf of Corinth and two submarines in Nafpaktos; two days later a coastguard vessel was attacked at Aegina, off Athens. Ciano's diary confirms that over the summer of 1940, Mussolini turned his attention to the Balkans: on 6 August, Mussolini was planning an attack on Yugoslavia, while on 10–12 August he railed against the Greeks, promising to rectify the "unfinished business" of 1923. Count Ciano was the Italian official who had pushed most strongly for the conquest of Albania in 1939 and afterwards Albania was ruled very much as his own "personal fiefdom" as the viceroy Francesco Jacomoni was a lackey of Ciano's. As a way of improving his prestige within the regime, Ciano was the Italian official who pressed the hardest for the invasion of Greece as he saw conquering Greece (an invasion that would have to be launched from Albania) as a way of showing off just how well run Albania was under his rule. On 10 August 1940, Ciano met Mussolini to tell him the story of the Albanian bandit Daut Hoxha, whom Ciano presented to Mussolini as a pro-Italian Albanian patriot murdered by the Greeks. In reality, Hoxha was a cattle-thief with a "long history of extreme violence and criminality" who had been beheaded by a rival gang of Albanian bandits. As intended, Ciano's story worked Mussolini into a state of rage against the Greeks, with Ciano writing in his diary: "The Duce is considering an 'act of force because since 1923 [the Corfu incident] he has some accounts to settle and the Greeks deceive themselves if they think he has forgotten'".

On 11 August, orchestrated by Ciano and the Italian viceroy in Albania, Francesco Jacomoni, the Italian and Albanian press began a campaign against Greece, on the pretext of the murder of the bandit Daut Hoxha in June. Hoxha was presented as a patriot fighting for the liberty of Chameria and his murder the work of Greek agents. Ciano wrote approvingly in his diary that Mussolini wanted more information on Ciamuria (the Italian term for Epirus) and had ordered both Jacomoni and General Count Sebastiano Visconti Prasca Guzzoni to Rome. Visconti Prasca, the aristocratic commander of the Regio Esercito forces in Albania was a bodybuilder excessively proud of his "manly physique" who neglected his military duties in favor of physical exercises, and promptly told Mussolini that his forces were more than capable of conquering Greece. Although Greek "expansionism" was denounced and claims for the surrender of Chameria made, Ciano and well-informed German sources regarded the press campaign as a means to intimidate Greece, rather than a prelude to war.

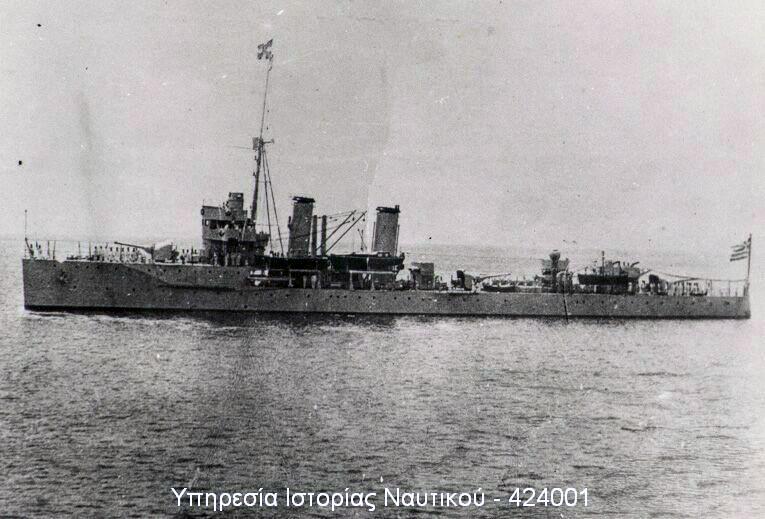
Greek cruiser Elli that was sunk on 15 August 1940 while she sat at anchor.

On 15 August 1940 (the Dormition of the Theotokos, a Greek national religious holiday), the Greek light cruiser Elli was sunk by the Italian submarine Delfino in Tinos harbour. The sinking was a result of orders by Mussolini and Navy chief Domenico Cavagnari allowing submarine attacks on neutral shipping. This was taken up by De Vecchi, who ordered the Delfino's commander to "sink everything in sight in the vicinity of Tinos and Syros", giving the impression that war was imminent. On the same day, another Greek steamship was bombarded by Italian planes in Crete. Despite evidence of Italian responsibility, the Greek government announced that the attack had been carried out by a submarine of unknown nationality. No-one was fooled and the sinking of Elli outraged the Greek people. Ambassador Grazzi wrote in his memoirs that the attack united a people "deeply riven by unbridgeable political differences and old and deep-running political hatreds" and imbued them with a firm resolve to resist. Grazzi's position was particularly problematic: a firm believer in Italian–Greek friendship, and unaware of Ciano's shift towards war, he tried his best to smooth over problems and avoid a conflict. As a result, Metaxas, who believed Grazzi to be a "faithful executor of Rome's orders", was left unsure of Italy's true intentions, wavering between optimism and "crises of prudent rationalism", in the words of Tsirpanlis. Neither Metaxas nor Grazzi realized that the latter was being kept in his post "deliberately in order to allay the suspicions of the Greek government and so that the aggressive plans against Greece might remain concealed".

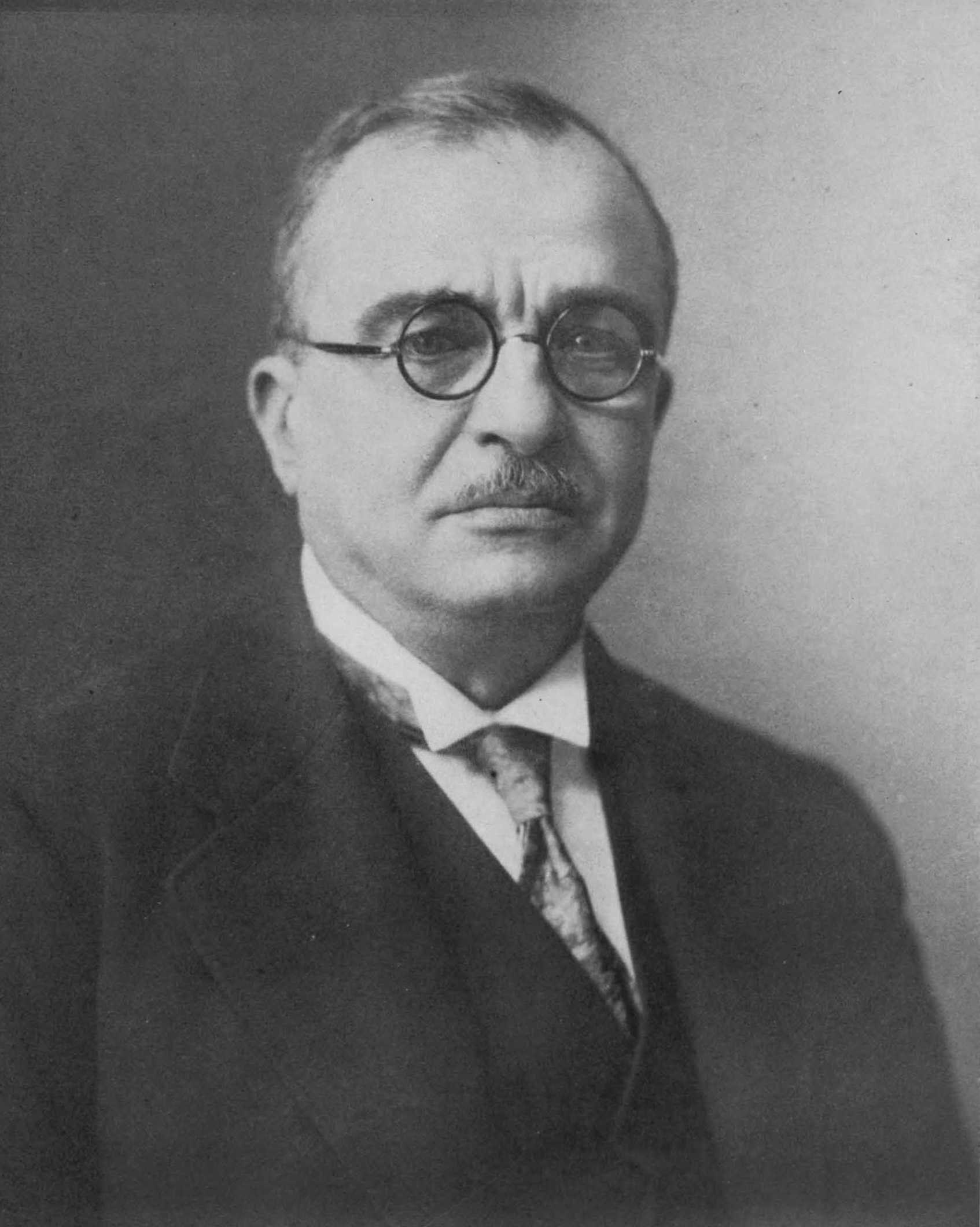
Ioannis Metaxas, Prime Minister of Greece (1936–1941)

German intervention, urging Italy to avoid Balkan complications and concentrate on Britain, along with the start of the Italian invasion of Egypt, led to the postponement of Italian ambitions in Greece and Yugoslavia: on 22 August, Mussolini postponed the attack on Greece for the end of September, and for 20 October on Yugoslavia. On 7 October, German troops entered Romania, to guard the Ploiești oil fields and prepare for Operation Barbarossa. Mussolini, who had not been informed in advance, regarded it as an encroachment on Italy's sphere of influence in the Balkans, and advanced plans for an invasion of Greece. The fact that Hitler never told Mussolini of any foreign policy moves in advance had long been considered humiliating by the latter and he was determined to strike Greece without informing Hitler as a way of asserting Italian equality with Germany. On 13 October, Mussolini told Marshal Badoglio that Italy was going to war with Greece, with Badoglio making no objections. The next day, Badoglio first learned that Mussolini planned to occupy all of Greece instead of just Epirus as he had been led to understand, which led Badoglio to say that the Regio Esercito would require 20 divisions in Albania, which in turn would require 3 months, but he did not press this point. The one man in Italy who could have stopped the war, King Victor Emmanuel III, chose to bless it instead. The king told Mussolini at a meeting that he had his support as he expected the Greeks to "crumble". Victor Emmanuel was looking forward to having a fourth crown to wear (Mussolini had already given Victor Emmanuel the titles Emperor of Ethiopia and King of the Albanians).

== Opposing plans ==
=== Italy ===
The Italian war aim was to establish a Greek puppet state, which would permit the Italian annexation of the Ionian Islands and the Sporades and the Cyclades islands in the Aegean Sea, to be administered as a part of the Italian Islands of the Aegean. The islands were claimed on the basis that they had once belonged to the Venetian Republic and the Venetian client state of Naxos. The Epirus and Acarnania regions were to be separated from the rest of the Greek territory and the Italian-controlled Kingdom of Albania was to annex territory between the Greek north-western frontier and a line from Florina to Pindus, Arta and Preveza. The Italians intended to partly compensate Greece for its extensive territorial losses by allowing it to annex the British Crown Colony of Cyprus after the war.

On 13 October, Mussolini finalized the decision for war when he informed Marshal Badoglio to start preparing an attack for 26 October. Badoglio then issued the order for the Italian military to begin preparations for executing the existing war plan, "Contingency G[reece]", which envisioned the capture of Epirus as far as Arta but left the further pursuit of the campaign open. On the next day, Badoglio and acting Army Chief of Staff Mario Roatta met with Mussolini, who announced that his objective was the capture of the entire country and that he would contact Bulgaria for a joint operation. Roatta advised that an extension of the invasion beyond Epirus would require an additional ten divisions, which would take three months to arrive and suggested limiting the extent of the Italian demobilization. Both generals urged Mussolini to replace the local commander, Lieutenant-General Sebastiano Visconti Prasca, with someone of greater seniority and experience. Mussolini seemingly agreed but also insisted on the attack going ahead at the determined date, provisionally under Prasca's command. Badoglio and Roatta seemed unconvinced that the operation would take place, as with similar projects against Greece and Yugoslavia.

The following day Mussolini called another conference, with Badoglio, Roatta, Visconti Prasca, Ciano, and Jacomoni. Neither Admiral Domenico Cavagnari of the Regia Marina nor Francesco Pricolo of the Regia Aeronautica were asked to attend while Roatta arrived late as he was invited by Mussolini's secretary to the meeting just before it started. Mussolini reiterated his objectives; stated he believed that neither of Greece's allies in the Balkan Pact, Yugoslavia or Turkey would act; expressed his determination that the attack take place on 26 October and asked for the opinion of the assembled. Jacomoni agreed that the Albanians were enthusiastic but that the Greeks would fight, likely with British help, while Ciano suggested that the Greek people were apathetic and would not support the "plutocratic" ruling class. Prasca offered assurances that the operation was as perfectly planned as "humanly possible", and promised to finish off the Greek forces in Epirus (which he estimated at 30,000 men) and capture the port of Preveza in ten to fifteen days. Prasca regarded the campaign as an opportunity to win fame and achieve the coveted rank of Marshal of Italy by conquering Athens. He was relatively junior in his rank and knew that if he demanded more troops for the Albanian front, it was likely that a more senior officer would be sent to command the operation, earning the accolades and promotions instead.

During the discussion only Badoglio voiced objections, pointing out that stopping after seizing Epirus—which he conceded would present little difficulty—would be an error, and that a force of at least twenty divisions would be necessary to conquer the whole country, including Crete, through he did not criticize Prasca's plans. Badoglio also stated he believed it was very unlikely that Britain would send forces to Greece and wanted an Italian offensive into Egypt to be timed with the invasion of Greece. Roatta suggested that the schedule of moving troops to Albania would have to be accelerated and called for two divisions to be sent against Thessaloniki as a diversion. Prasca pointed out the inadequacy of Albanian harbours for the rapid transfer of Italian divisions, the mountainous terrain, and the poor state of the Greek transport network, but remained confident that Athens could be captured after the fall of Epirus, with "five or six divisions". The meeting ended with an outline plan, summed up by Mussolini as "offensive in Epirus; observation and pressure on Salonika, and, in a second phase, march on Athens". The British historian Ian Kershaw called the meeting at the Palazzo Venezia on 15 October 1940 "one of the most superficial and dilettantish discussions of high-risk military strategy ever recorded". The Greek historian Aristotle Kallis writes that Mussolini in October 1940 "was overpowered by hubris", a supremely overconfident man whose vainglorious pursuit of power led him to believe that under his leadership Italy was about to win as he put it "the glory she has sought in vain for three centuries".

The staging of incidents at the border to provide a suitable pretext (analogous to the Gleiwitz incident) was agreed for 24 October. Mussolini suggested that the expected advance of the 10th Army (Marshal Rodolfo Graziani) on Mersa Matruh, in Egypt, be brought forward to prevent the British from aiding Greece. Over the next couple of days Badoglio failed to elicit objections to the attack from the other service chiefs or to achieve its cancellation on technical grounds. Mussolini, enraged by the Marshal's obstructionism, threatened to accept his resignation if offered. Badoglio backed down, managing only to secure a postponement of the attack until 28 October.

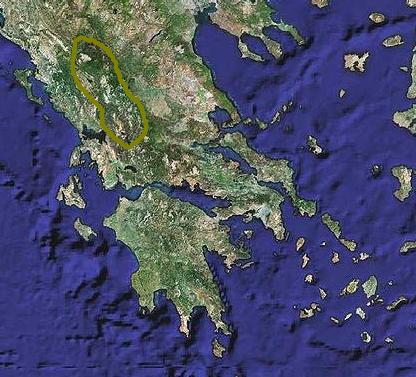
Pindus mountains outlined

The front was roughly 150 kilometres (90 mi) wide in mountain terrain with very few roads. The Pindus mountains divided it into two theatres of operations, Epirus and western Macedonia. The Italian forces in Albania were organised accordingly: the XXV Ciamuria Corps (Lieutenant-General Carlo Rossi) in the west was charged with the conquest of Epirus, while the XXVI Corizza Corps (Lieutenant-General Gabriele Nasci) in the east, around Korçë, would initially remain passive in the direction of western Macedonia.

On 18 October Mussolini sent a letter to Tsar Boris III of Bulgaria inviting him to take part in the coming action against Greece, but Boris refused, citing his country's unreadiness and its encirclement by hostile neighbours. This was not regarded as a major setback, as the Italian leadership considered that the threat of Bulgarian intervention alone would compel the Greek High Command to commit most of its army in eastern Macedonia and Thrace. It was not until 24 October that Badoglio realized that not only were the Greeks already mobilizing, but that they were prepared to divert most of their forces to Epirus, leaving only six divisions against Bulgaria. Prasca would still have numerical superiority at the start of the campaign (some 150,000 men against 120,000) but concerns grew over the vulnerability of the left flank. The 29th Infantry Division "Piemonte" was diverted from the attack in Epirus to bolster XXVI Corps in the Korçë area, while the 19th Infantry Division "Venezia" was ordered south from its position along the Yugoslav border.

In 1936 General Alberto Pariani had been appointed Chief of Staff of the army, and had begun a reorganisation of divisions to fight wars of rapid decision, according to thinking that speed, mobility and new technology could revolutionise military operations. In 1937, three-regiment (triangular) divisions began to change to two-regiment (binary divisions), as part of a ten years plan to reorganise the standing army into 24 binary, 24 triangular, twelve mountain, three motorised and three armoured divisions. The effect of the change was to increase the administrative overhead of the army, with no corresponding increase in effectiveness, as the new technology of tanks, motor vehicles, and wireless communications was slow to arrive and was inferior to that of potential enemies. The dilution of the officer class by the need for extra unit staffs was made worse by the politicisation of the army and the addition of Blackshirt Militia. The reforms also promoted frontal assaults to the exclusion of other theories, dropping the previous emphasis on fast mobile warfare backed by artillery.

Prior to the invasion Mussolini let 300,000 troops and 600,000 reservists go home for the harvest. There were supposed to be 1,750 lorries used in the invasion but only 107 arrived. The possibility that Greek officials situated in the front area could be corrupted or would not react to an invasion proved to be mostly wishful thinking, used by Italian generals and personalities in favor of a military intervention; the same was true for an alleged revolt of the Albanian minority living in Chameria, located in the Greek territory immediately behind the boundary, which would break out after the beginning of the attack.

On the eve of 28 October 1940, Italy's ambassador in Athens, Emanuele Grazzi, handed an ultimatum from Mussolini to Metaxas. It demanded free passage for his troops to occupy unspecified strategic points inside Greek territory. Greece had been friendly towards Nazi Germany, profiting from mutual trade relations, but now Germany's ally, Italy, intended to invade Greece. Metaxas rejected the ultimatum with the words "Alors, c'est la guerre" (French for "then it is war"). In this, he echoed the will of the Greek people to resist, a will that was popularly expressed in one word: "ochi" (Όχι) (Greek for "no"). Within hours, Italy attacked Greece from Albania. The outbreak of hostilities was first announced by Athens Radio early in the morning of 28 October, with the two-sentence dispatch of the general staff.

Since 05:30 this morning, the enemy is attacking our vanguard on the Greek–Albanian border. Our forces are defending the fatherland.

— Greek General Staff, 28 October 1940

=== Greece ===
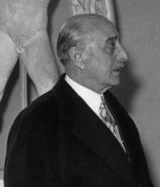
Alexandros Papagos, commander of the Greek Army

In 1936, the 4th of August Regime came to power in Greece, under the leadership of Ioannis Metaxas. Plans were laid down for the reorganization of the Greek armed forces, including building the "Metaxas Line'", a defensive fortification along the Greco-Bulgarian frontier. Large sums of money were spent to re-equip the army but due to the increasing threat of and the eventual outbreak of war, the most significant foreign purchases from 1938 to 1939, were only partly delivered or not at all. A massive contingency plan was developed and great amounts of food and equipment were stockpiled in many parts of the country as a precaution in the event of war. After the Italian occupation of Albania in spring 1939, the Greek General Staff prepared the "IB" (Italy-Bulgaria) plan, anticipating a combined offensive by Italy and Bulgaria. Given the overwhelming superiority of such an alliance in manpower and matériel, the plan prescribed a purely defensive strategy, including the gradual retreat of the Greek forces in Epirus to the Arachthos River–Metsovo–Aliakmon River–Mt. Vermion line, to gain time for the completion of mobilization.

With the completion of partial mobilization of the frontier formations, the plan was revised with variants "IBa" (1 September 1939) and "IBb" (20 April 1940). These modified the role of the main Greek force in the region, the 8th Infantry Division (Major-General Charalambos Katsimitros). Plan "IB" foresaw it covering the left flank of the bulk of the Greek forces in western Macedonia, securing the Metsovon pass and blocking entry into Aetolia-Acarnania, "IBa" ordered the covering of Ioannina and the defence of the Kalamas river line. Katsimitros had discretion to choose the defensive line and chose the Kalpaki line, which lay astride the main invasion axis from Albania and allowed him to use the Kalamas swamps to neutralize the Italian tank threat. The Greek General Staff remained focused on Bulgaria as its main potential enemy: of the 851 million drachmas spent on fortification between April 1939 and October 1940, only 82 million went to the Albanian frontier and the rest on the Metaxas Line and other works in the north-east.

Nevertheless, given the enormous numerical and material superiority of the Italian military, the Greek leadership, from Metaxas down, was reserved and cautious, with few hopes of outright victory in a conflict with Italy. The General Staff's plan for the defence of Epirus envisaged withdrawal to a more defensible line, and it was only through Katsimitros' insistence that the Italian attack was confronted close to the border. Metaxas himself, during a briefing of the press on 30 October 1940, reiterated his unshakeable confidence on the ultimate victory of Britain, and hence of Greece, but was less confident on the short-term prospects, noting that "Greece is not fighting for victory. It is fighting for glory. And for its honour. ... A nation must be able to fight, if it wants to remain great, even with no hope of victory. Just because it has to." On the other hand, this pessimism was not shared by the population at large, whose enthusiasm, optimism, and the almost religious indignation at the torpedoing of Elli, created an élan that helped transform the conflict in Greece's favour. As late as March 1941, when the German intervention was looming, an Italian officer summed up the Greeks' attitude for Mussolini with the words of a captured Greek officer: "we are sure that we will lose the war, but we will give you the spanking you need".

== Forces ==
=== Italy ===
In the Epirus sector, the Army Corps of the Ciamuria, which operated in the Chameria region (Italian: Ciamuria), and consisted of the 23rd Infantry Division "Ferrara" (12,785 men, 60 guns and 3,500 Albanian auxiliary troops), the 51st Infantry Division "Siena" (9,200 men and 50 guns), the 131st Armored Division "Centauro" (4,037 men, 24 guns and 163 light tanks, of which only 90 operational)., and the Regiment "Cavalleggeri Guide". In addition, the army corps was reinforced by the brigade-level Littoral Grouping, which consisted of the 3rd Regiment "Granatieri di Sardegna e d'Albania", Regiment "Lancieri di Aosta" and Regiment "Lancieri di Milano", and operated on the Italian right along the coast (4,823 men and 32 guns). The Army Corps of the Ciamuria, which was renamed XXV Army Corps on 17 November 1940, comprised 22 infantry battalions, three cavalry regiments, 61 artillery batteries (18 heavy) and 90 tanks. Along with Blackshirt battalions and auxiliary troops, it numbered c. 42,000 men. XXVI Army Corps in the Korçë area comprised the 29th Infantry Division "Piemonte" (9,300 men and 32 guns), and the 49th Infantry Division "Parma" (12,000 men and 60 guns). In addition, the Corps comprised the 19th Infantry Division "Venezia" (10,000 men and 40 guns), moving south from its deployment along the Yugoslav frontier between Lake Prespa and Elbasan, and was later reinforced with the 53rd Infantry Division "Arezzo" (12,000 men and 32 guns) around Shkodër. The XXVI Army Corps totalled 32 infantry battalions, about ten tanks and two cavalry companies, 68 batteries (7 heavy) for a total of c. 44,000 men. The 3rd Alpine Division "Julia" with (10,800 men and 29 guns), was placed between the corps to cover the advance of XXV Army Corps along the Pindus mountains. The Regia Aeronautica had 380 aircraft available for operations against Greece. About half of the fighter force consisted of 64 Fiat CR.42 Falco (Hawk) and 23 Fiat CR.32 Freccia (Arrow) biplanes (the latter already outdated). More modern and effective were the fifty Fiat G.50bis, Italian first all-metal fighters, available at the opening of the hostilities. Sixty CANT Z.1007s Alcione (Halcyon) represented the bulk of the Italian bomber force. Of wooden construction, these three-engined aircraft could endure a lot of punishment and were highly manoeuvrable. Other trimotors were also based on Albanian airfields: 72 Savoia-Marchetti SM.81 Pipistrello (Bat), a veteran of Spanish War, with fixed undercarriage, and 31 Savoia-Marchetti SM.79 Sparviero (Sparrowhawk) built with steel tubes, timber, aluminium, and fabric and carrying scarce defensive firepower.

=== Greece ===
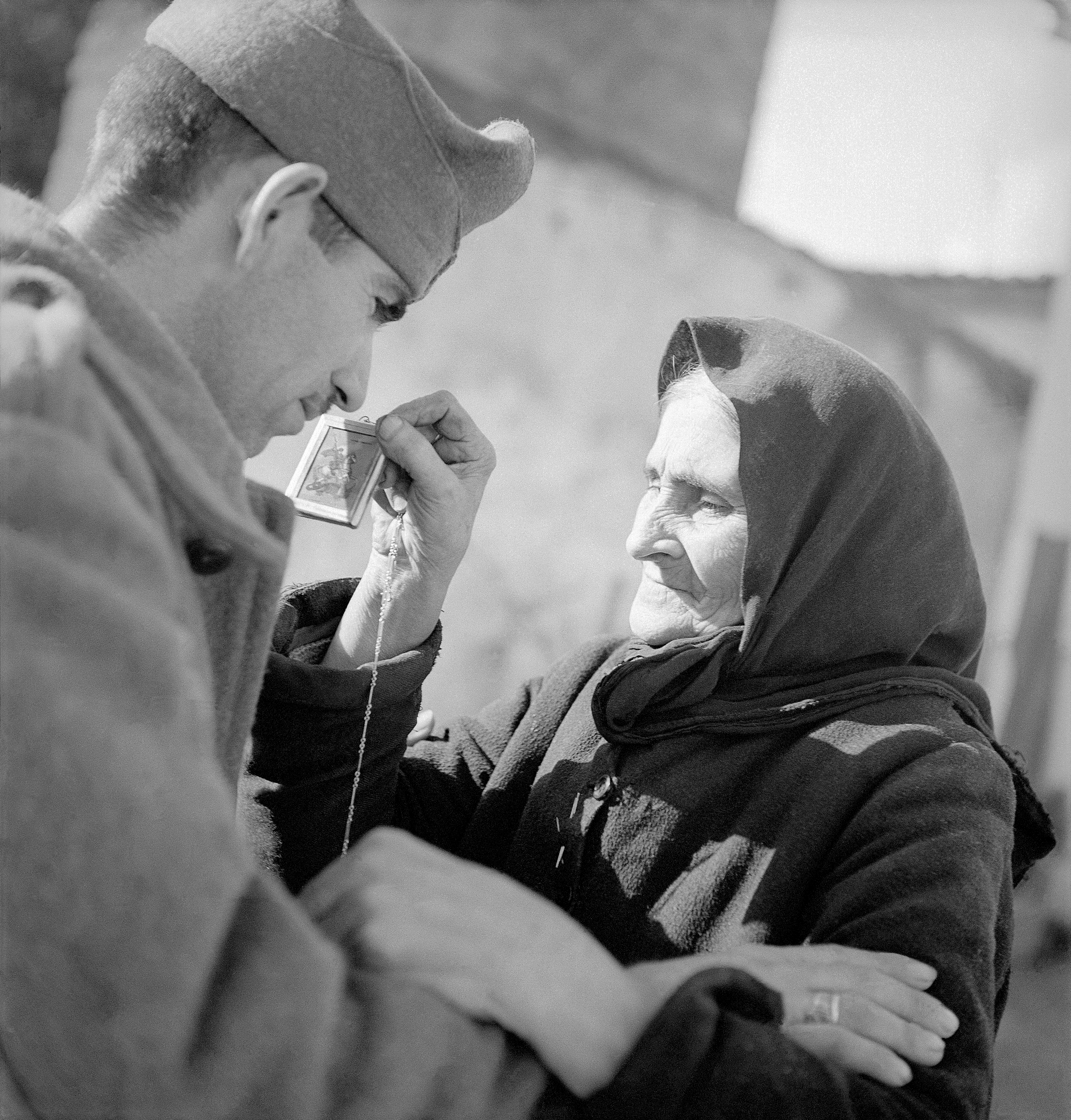
A Greek woman sees her son depart for the Albanian front.

On 28 October, the Greek army had 14 infantry divisions, one cavalry division and three infantry brigades, all at least partly mobilized since August; four infantry divisions and two brigades were on the border with Albania; five infantry divisions faced Bulgaria and five more with the cavalry division were in general reserve. Greek army divisions were triangular and held up to 50 per cent more infantry than the Italian binary divisions, with slightly more medium artillery and machine-guns but no tanks. Most Greek equipment was still of First World War issue, from countries like Belgium, Austria, Poland and France, all of which were under Axis occupation, cutting off the supply of spare parts and ammunition. Many senior Greek officers were veterans of a decade of almost continuous warfare, including the Balkan Wars of 1912–13, the First World War, and the Greco-Turkish War of 1919–22. Greece had conscription with all able-bodied males upon turning 18 years old were required to serve for 24 months in the military.

In Epirus, the 8th Infantry Division was already mobilized and reinforced with a regiment and the staff of the 3rd Infantry Brigade, fielding 15 infantry battalions and 16 artillery batteries. At the time of the Italian attack, the 2/39 Evzone Regiment was moving north from Missolonghi to reinforce the division. The western Macedonia sector was held by the Western Macedonia Army Section (TSDM), based at Kozani (Lieutenant-General Ioannis Pitsikas), with the II Army Corps (Lieutenant-General Dimitrios Papadopoulos) and III Army Corps (Lieutenant-General Georgios Tsolakoglou), each of two infantry divisions and an infantry brigade. The total forces available to TSDM on the outbreak of war consisted of 22 infantry battalions and 22 artillery batteries (seven heavy). The Pindus sector was covered by the "Pindus Detachment" (Απόσπασμα Πίνδου) (Colonel Konstantinos Davakis) with two battalions, a cavalry company and 1.5 artillery batteries.

The Royal Hellenic Air Force (Ellinikí Vasilikí Aeroporía, RHAF) had to face the numerically and technologically superior Regia Aeronautica. It comprised 45 fighters, 24 light bombers, nine reconnaissance aircraft, about 65 auxiliary aeroplanes and 28 naval cooperation aircraft. It consisted of the 21st, 22nd, 23rd and 24th pursuit squadrons, the 31st, 32nd, 33rd bomber squadrons, the 1st, 2nd, 3rd, 4th military cooperation squadrons, the 2828 Independent Military Cooperation Flight and the 11th, 12th and 13th naval cooperation squadrons. At the outbreak of the war the operational combat fleet of the Royal Greek Air Force counted 24 PZL P.24 and nine Bloch MB.151 fighters, as well as eleven Bristol Blenheim Mk IV, ten Fairey Battle B.1 and eight Potez 633 B2 bombers. Serviceable ground attack and naval support aircraft included about nine Breguet 19 two-seater biplane bombers, 15 Henschel Hs 126 reconnaissance and observation aircraft, 17 Potez 25A observation aircraft, nine Fairey III amphibious reconnaissance aircraft, 12 Dornier Do 22G torpedo bombers, and 9 Avro Anson maritime reconnaissance aircraft. The main air bases were located in Sedes, Larissa, Dekeleia, Faleron, Eleusis, Nea Anchialos and Maleme.

The Royal Hellenic Navy had the elderly cruiser Georgios Averof, two modern destroyers, four slightly older Italian destroyers and four obsolete Aetos-class destroyers. There were six old submarines, fifteen obsolete torpedo boats and about thirty other auxiliary vessels.

=== Britain ===
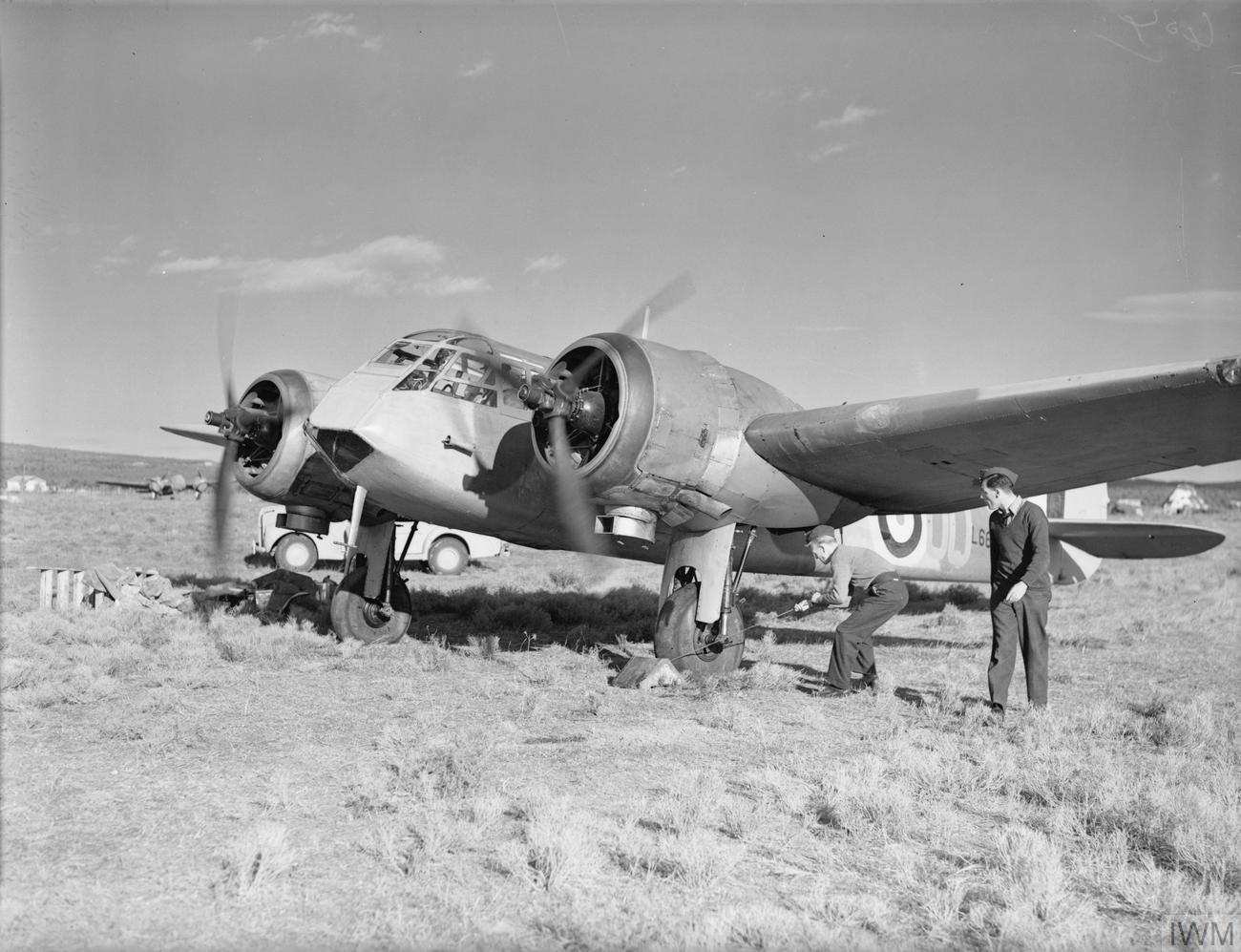
Bristol Blenheim bomber of No. 211 Squadron RAF at Menidi, Greece

On 22 October 1940, six days before the Italian invasion of Greece, despite the Italian invasion of Egypt, the RAF Air Officer Commanding-in-Chief Middle East in Cairo was ordered to prepare squadrons for Greece, based on Ultra decodes and other sources that an Italian invasion of Greece was imminent. The RAF first sent 30 Squadron, consisting of one flight of Blenheim IF night fighters and one flight of Blenheim I light bombers, that were based at Athens-Eleusis airfield. Soon afterwards, six Vickers Wellington medium bombers were detached from 70 Squadron and a flight of Blenheim Is from 84 Squadron arrived. All RAF assets were placed under the command of Air vice-marshal John D'Albiac. The RAF aircraft participated in the Greek counter-offensive that began on 14 November, with No. 84 Squadron operating forward from Menidi. A few days later, the Gloster Gladiator fighters of 80 Squadron moved forward to Trikala, causing significant losses to the Regia Aeronautica. 211 Squadron with Blenheim Is, followed before the end of November, joining 84 Squadron at Menidi and 80 Squadron moved to Yannina, about 65 kilometres (40 mi) from the Albanian border. In the first week of December, 14 Gladiators were transferred from the RAF to the RHAF.

== Campaign ==
The Greek official history of the Greco-Italian War divides it into three periods:

- The Italian offensive and its failure from 28 October to 13 November 1940
- The Greek counter-offensive, from 14 November to 6 January 1941, the initial Greek counter-offensive in 14–23 November, with the restoration of the pre-war border in Epirus and the capture of Korçë, followed by the Greek advance into Albania until 6 January 1941
- The gradual stabilization of the front from 6 January 1941 until the onset of the German attack on 6 April; the final Greek advances, until 8 March, followed by the Italian spring offensive and the stalemate until April.

The Greek commander-in-chief, Alexandros Papagos, in his memoirs regarded the second phase as ending on 28 December 1940; as the historian Ioannis Koliopoulos comments, this seems more appropriate, as December marked a watershed in the course of the war, with the Greek counter-offensive gradually grinding to a halt, the German threat becoming clear, and the beginning of British attempts to guide and shape Greek strategy. According to Koliopoulos, the final three months of the war were militarily of little significance as they did not alter the situation of the two combatants, but were mostly dominated by the diplomatic and political developments leading up to the German invasion.

=== Italian offensive (28 October – 13 November 1940) ===
Italian invasion of Greece

Italian forces invaded Greece in several columns. On the extreme Italian right, the coastal group moved south in the direction of Konispol with the final aim of capturing Igoumenitsa and thence driving onto Preveza. In the central sector, the Siena Division moved in two columns onto the area of Filiates, while the Ferrara Division moved in four columns against the main Greek resistance line at Kalpaki with the aim of capturing Ioannina. On the Pindus sector, the Julia Division launched five columns aiming to capture Metsovo and cut off the Greek forces in the Epirus sector from the east. With the onset of the Italian offensive, Papagos, until then the Chief of the Hellenic Army General Staff, was appointed commander-in-chief of the newly established General Headquarters. The Army General Staff, which functioned as the main field staff throughout the war, was handed over to Lieutenant-General Konstantinos Pallis, recalled from retirement. With Bulgarian neutrality assured—following the terms of the Balkan Pact of 1935, the Turks threatened to intervene on Greece's side if the Bulgarians attacked Greece—the Greek high command was free to throw the bulk of its army against Italian forces in Albania. Almost half the forces assigned to the Bulgarian front (13th and 17th Divisions, 16th Infantry Brigade) and the entirety of the general reserve (I Army Corps with 2nd, 3rd, and 4th Infantry Divisions, as well as the Cretan 5th Infantry Division and the Cavalry Division) were directed to the Albanian front.

==== Epirus and coastal sectors ====
On the Epirus sector, Katsimitros had left five battalions along the border to delay the Italian advance, and installed his main resistance line in a convex front with the Kalpaki pass in the centre, manned by nine battalions. Further two battalions under Major-General Nikolaos Lioumbas took over the coastal sector in Thesprotia. The swamps of the Kalamas river, especially before Kalpaki, formed a major obstacle not only to armoured formations, but even to the movement of infantry. A further battalion and some artillery were detached to the Preveza area in the event of an Italian landing, but as this did not materialize, they were swiftly moved to reinforce the coastal sector. By the night of 29/30 October, the Greek covering units had withdrawn to the Kalpaki line, and by 1 November, Italian units made contact with the Greek line. During these three days, the Italians prepared their assault, bombarding the Greek positions with aircraft and artillery. In the meantime, the developing Italian threat in the Pindus sector forced Papagos to cable Katsimitros that his main mission was to cover the Pindus passes and the flanks of the Greek forces in western Macedonia, and to avoid offering resistance if it left his forces depleted. Katsimitros had already decided to defend his line, however, and disregarded these instructions, but detached some forces to cover its right along the Aoös River. On 1 November, the Italians managed to capture Konitsa and the Comando Supremo gave the Albanian front priority over Africa.

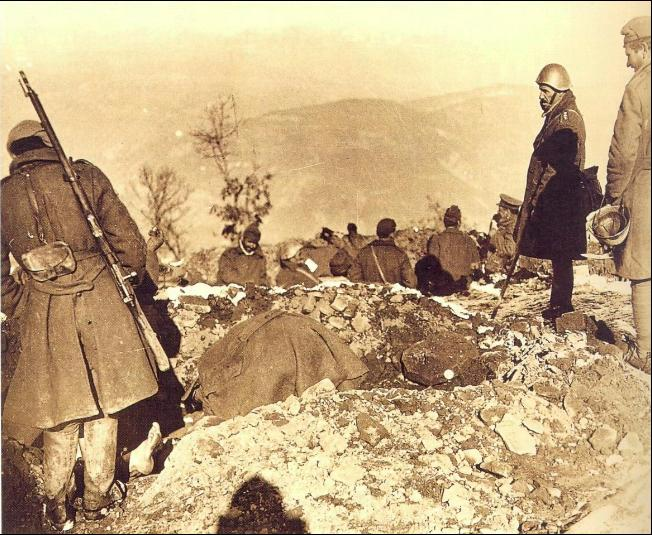
Greek soldiers constructing fortifications at Kalamas

The scheduled Italian amphibious assault on Corfu did not materialize due to bad weather. The Italian navy commander, Admiral Domenico Cavagnari, postponed the landing to 2 November, but by that time Visconti Prasca was urgently demanding reinforcements, and Mussolini ordered that the 47th Infantry Division "Bari", earmarked for the operation, be sent to Albania instead. Mussolini proposed a landing at Preveza on 3 November to break the emerging impasse, but the proposal met with immediate and categorical refusal by the service chiefs.

The main Italian attack on the Kalpaki front began on 2 November. An Albanian battalion, under the cover of a snowstorm, managed to capture the Grabala heights, but were thrown back by a counterattack on the next day. On the same day, an attack spearheaded by 50–60 tanks against the main Kalpaki sector was also repulsed. The Greek units east of the Kalamas were withdrawn during the night. On 5–7 November, repeated assaults were launched against the Grabala and other heights; on the night of the 7th, Grabala briefly fell once more, but was swiftly recaptured. On 8 November, the Italians began withdrawing and assuming defensive positions until the arrival of reinforcements. On the coastal sector, the Italians made better progress. The Greek covering units were forced south of the Kalamas already on the first day, but the bad state of the roads delayed the Italian advance. On the night of 4/5 November, the Italians crossed the river and broke through the defences of the local Greek battalion, forcing Lioumbas to order his forces to withdraw south of the Acheron River. Igoumenitsa was captured on 6 November, and on the next day, the Italians reached Margariti. This marked their deepest advance, as the Thesprotia Sector began receiving reinforcements from Katsimitros, and as on the other sectors the situation had already turned to the Greeks' favour.

As evidence of the Italian offensive's failure mounted, on 8 November, Visconti Prasca was relieved of overall command in Albania and relegated to command the Italian forces in the Epirus front, while General Ubaldo Soddu, State Undersecretary of War, assumed his place. Soddu's report from Albania underlined Greek resistance in Epirus and the mounting threat of the Greek concentration in western Macedonia, and recommended taking up defensive positions "while awaiting the reinforcements that would permit us to resume action as soon as possible". Mussolini consented. With the Italians on the defensive, 8th Division began launching local counterattacks to regain the lost ground. By 13 November, the Greek forces once again stood at the Kalamas river along its entire length. On 12 November, I Army Corps under Lieutenant-General Panagiotis Demestichas took over the Epirus sector. 8th Division was subordinated to it, while the coastal sector was placed under the independent Lioumbas Detachment.

==== Pindus sector ====
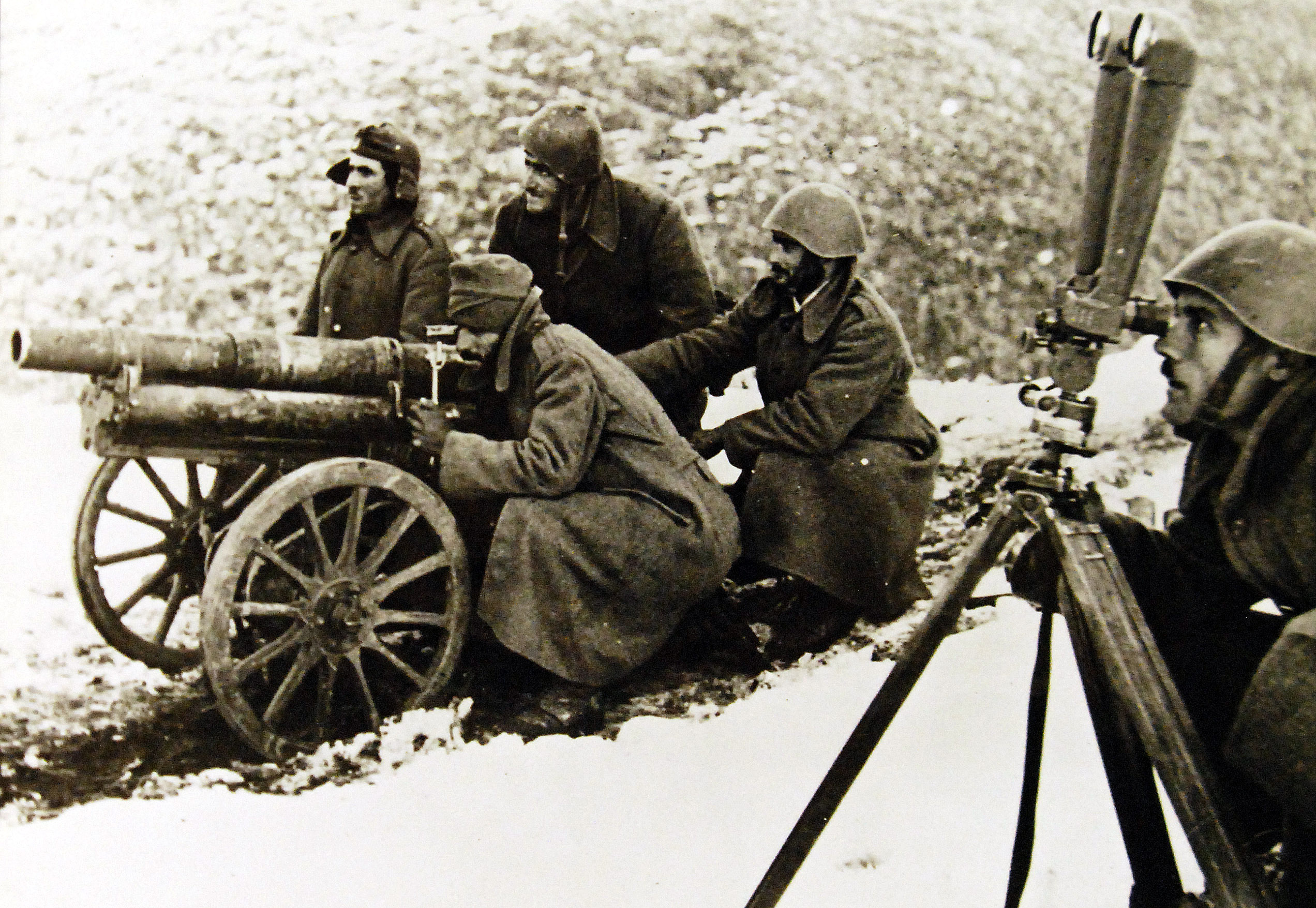
Greek soldiers operating a field gun

A greater threat to the Greek positions was posed by the advance of the 3rd Alpine Division "Julia", under Mario Girotti, over the Pindus Mountains towards Metsovo, which threatened to separate the Greek forces in Epirus from those in Macedonia. The opposing Greek force, the Pindus Detachment, numbered 2,000 men, was formed of reservists of the 51st Regiment, mobilized on 29 August, while one of its three battalions (III/51) was formed as late as 15 October and was still on its way to the front. Colonel Davakis and his men had to cover a front some 37 km in width, and moreover over extremely broken terrain. The Italian attack began under torrential rainfall and made rapid progress, forcing the Greeks to abandon their forward posts, especially in the Detachment's central sector. Davakis was forced to deploy the companies of the III/51 Battalion piecemeal as soon as they arrived, leaving himself with no reserves.

The situation worried the TSDM, which began sending whatever reinforcements it could muster, and assigned the Pindus sector to the 1st Infantry Division. Despite the onset of snowfall on the 29th, the Julia Division continued pressing its attack on the Greek centre and left during 29–30 October, forcing the Greeks to withdraw towards Samarina. From 30 October, however, the Greeks managed to stabilize the situation. Command in the Pindus sector passed to 1st Division and Major-General Vasileios Vrachnos, while additional forces—the Cavalry Division, 5th Brigade, and he newly formed Cavalry Brigade—were deployed on the flanks of the Italian salient and in the rear to secure the vital passes.

After covering 40 kilometres (25 mi) of mountain terrain in icy rain, the Julia Division captured the village of Vovousa, on 2 November, but failed to reach its primary objective; Metsovo, 30 kilometres (20 mi) south. That same day, Davakis was gravely wounded during a reconnaissance mission near Fourka. However, it had become clear to the Italians that they lacked the manpower and the supplies to continue in the face of the arriving Greek reserves. On 3 November, the Italian spearhead was surrounded from all sides. The commander of the Julia Division requested from the Italian headquarters relief attacks and Italian reserves were thrown into the battle. Thus, Visconti Prasca sent forward the Bari Division to its aid, but it was unable to reach the cut-off Italian forces. In the meantime, the assistance of the local civilians, including men, women, and children, to the Greek forces proved invaluable. As a result of the Greek pressure the Julia Division was virtually wiped out, while the villages previously taken by the Italians were recaptured on 3 and 4 November. Within less than a week, the remaining Italian troops in this sector were in roughly the same positions they occupied before the declaration of the war. By 13 November the Greek forces had completed the re-occupation of the Grammos and Smolikas mountain ranges. On the same day, Visconti Prasca was relieved and recalled to Italy.

=== Greek counter-offensive (14 November 1940 – 6 January 1941) ===
Greek counter-offensive (13 November 1940 – 7 April 1941)

By 14 November, the Italian forces in Albania had been reorganized in two field armies: the Ninth Army, formed out of the XXVI Corps in the Korçë sector, comprising five infantry and two alpine divisions with elite Alpini troops as well as a number of independent regiments, including Blackshirt and Albanian battalions; and the Eleventh Army (former XXV Corps) on the Epirus sector, with three infantry, an armoured, and a cavalry division, as well as a number of independent units. The Italian situation was very difficult, as the troops on the front had been fighting non-stop for three weeks and were exhausted. The supply situation was abysmal, with the army lacking lorries, horses, and mules; the limited capacity of Albania's two main ports, Valona and Durrës, created a bottleneck for supplies and reinforcements, while the airlift initiated between Italy and Tirana—which consumed all of the Italian Air Force's transport capacity to the detriment of Africa—could transport troops, but not heavy equipment. The Greek order of battle on 14 November consisted of Lieutenant-General Demestichas' I Corps on the coastal sector (2nd, 8th, and the Cavalry Divisions, and the Lioumbas Detachment), Lieutenant-General Papadopoulos' II Corps in the Pindus sector (1st Infantry Division, 5th Brigade and the Cavalry Brigade), and Lieutenant-General Tsolakoglou's III Corps in western Macedonia (9th, 10th, 15th Infantry Divisions, with 11th Division assembling in its rear). The latter two corps were under the command of TSDM, led by Lieutenant-General Pitsikas. The 3rd, 4th, and 5th Infantry Divisions, as well as the 16th Brigade, were kept in reserve. By 12 November, Papagos had over 100 infantry battalions on familiar terrain against fewer than fifty Italian battalions.

==== Fall of Korçë (14–23 November) ====
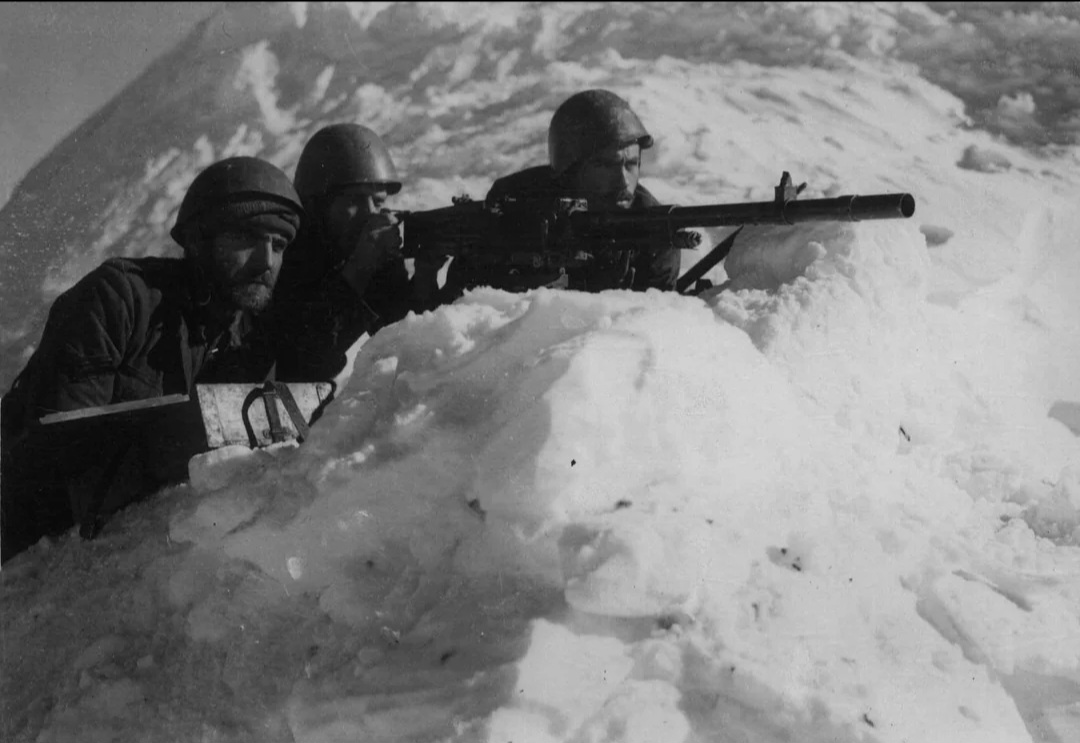
Italian machine gunner in winter

From the first days of November, III Corps had undertaken limited advances into Albanian territory, and already on 6 November, it submitted plans for a general offensive. Judging it too ambitious for the moment, Papagos postponed the offensive for 14 November. III Corps' main objective was the capture of the Korçë plateau, which controlled access to the interior of Albania along the valley of the Devoll river. The plateau lay behind the Morava and Ivan mountains on the Greco-Albanian frontier, which were held by the 29th Piemonte, the 19th Venezia, and the 49th Parma divisions. The Italians were later reinforced by the 2nd Alpine Division "Tridentina", the 53rd Infantry Division "Arezzo", and 30–50 tanks of the Centauro Division. Leaving five battalions to secure its rear, III Corps attacked with twenty battalions and 37 artillery batteries. Due to the lack of tanks or anti-tank weapons to counter Italian armour, the Greeks decided to limit their movement along the mountain ridges, never descending to the valleys. The offensive was launched on the morning of 14 November, with the corps' three divisions moving on converging lines of attack towards Korçë. To achieve surprise, the attack was not preceded by an artillery barrage.

The Italian forces were indeed taken by surprise, allowing the Greeks to force several breaches in the Italian positions on 14–16 November. On 17 November, III Corps was reinforced with 13th Division, and on the next day, with 11th Division, which along with the 10th Division formed a new command, the "K" Group of Divisions or OMK (Lieutenant-General Georgios Kosmas). The most critical moment for the Greeks came on 18 November, when elements of the 13th Division panicked during an ill-coordinated attack and the division almost retreated; its commander was sacked on the spot and the new commander, Major-General Sotirios Moutousis, forbade any further retreat, restoring the front. On 19–21 November, the Greeks captured the summit of Morava. Fearing that they would be surrounded and cut off, the Italians retreated towards the Devoll valley during the night, and on 22 November the city of Korçë was captured by 9th Division. By 27 November, TSDM had captured the entire Korçë plateau, suffering 624 dead and 2,348 wounded. Further south and west, I and II Corps had moved to evict the Italians from Greek territory, which they achieved by 23 November. II Corps further moved across the border line, capturing Ersekë on 21 November and Leskovik on the next day. On 23 November, bowing to pressure from Badoglio and Roatta, Mussolini finally reversed his early October order for demobilization.

==== Greek offensive towards Valona (23 November – December 1940) ====
Following the capture of Korçë and the eviction of the Italian forces from Greek soil, the Greek GHQ faced two options: continue the offensive in the Korçë sector in the direction of Elbasan or shift focus on the left flank and drive towards the port of Valona. The latter was chosen, as the capture of Valona would be of great strategic significance, leaving the Italians with only Durrës as an entry port. TSDM, comprising III Corps and OMK, would defend their positions on the Greek right and apply pressure, while I Corps would move north along the Gjirokastër–Tepelenë–Valona axis. II Corps would form the pivot of the movement, securing the connection between I Corps and TSDM, advancing in step with its western neighbour in the direction of Berat. I Corps was reinforced with 3rd Division (21 November) and II Corps with 11th Division (27 November) and the Cavalry Division (28 November).

I said that we would break the Negus' back. Now, with the same, absolute certainty, I repeat, absolute, I tell you that we will break Greece's back.

— Mussolini's speech in Palazzo Venezia, 18 November 1940

Between 24 and 30 November, I Corps moved north into Albania along the Drinos river, while II Corps moved in the direction of Frashër, which it captured in early December. TSDM continued to apply pressure against the Italians and the 10th Division captured Moscopole on 24 November. Pogradec was captured unopposed by the 13th Division on 30 November. The continued Greek advance caused another crisis in the Italian hierarchy. The news of the fall of Pogradec and the pessimistic reports of the Italian commanders in Albania reportedly caused Mussolini to consider asking for a truce through the Germans but in the end he recovered his nerve and ordered Soddu to hold fast. The Greeks would be worn out, since they had "... no war industry and can only count on supplies from Great Britain". Mussolini, encouraged by the hardline Fascist Party secretary Roberto Farinacci, sacked Badoglio on 4 December and replaced him with Ugo Cavallero as Chief of the General Staff. The resignation of the governor of the Italian Dodecanese, Cesare Maria De Vecchi and Admiral Cavagnari, followed within a few days.

I Corps captured Delvinë on 5 December and Gjirokastër on 8 December; the Lioumbas Detachment captured Sarandë— renamed Porto Edda after Edda Mussolini—on 6 December. Further east, the 2nd Division captured the Suhë Pass after a fierce struggle from 1–4 December, while 8th Division launched repeated attacks on the heights around the Kakavia Pass, forcing the Italians to withdraw on the night of 4/5 December. The division had suffered considerable losses but took over 1,500 prisoners, several artillery pieces and thirty tanks. In the TSDM sector, Lieutenant-General Kosmas (in command of the K Group, essentially the 10th Division) captured the Ostravicë Mountain on 12 December, while III Corps—since 1 December reinforced with 17th Division, which replaced 13th Division—completed its occupation of the Kamia massif and secured Pogradec.

On 2 December, Papagos, and Crown Prince Paul, visited the front. Pitsikas and Tsolakoglou urged him to order an immediate attack on the strategic Klisura Pass, without waiting for I and II Corps to level with TSDM. Papagos refused and ordered the plan to continue, with III Corps relegated to a passive role (this decision was later criticized, coupled with the onset of winter, it immobilised the Greek right wing). Despite the atrocious weather and the heavy snowfall, the Greek offensive continued on the left throughout December. I Corps, now comprising 2nd, 3rd and 4th Divisions (8th Division and the Lioumbas Detachment were moved back into reserve) captured Himarë on 22 December. II Corps, moving between the Aöos and the Apsos rivers, reached the vicinity of Klisura, but failed to capture the pass. To its right, the V Army Corps (the former K Group but still comprising only the 10th Division) managed to advance up to Mount Tomorr and secure the connection between II and III Corps, which remained in their positions.

=== End of the Greek offensive and stalemate (6 January – 6 April 1941) ===
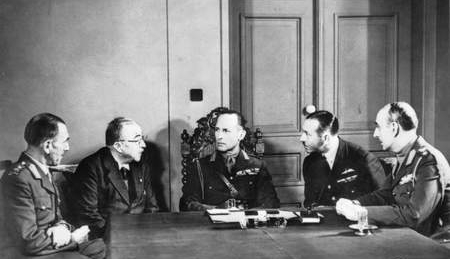
Meeting of the Anglo-Greek War Council c. January 1941. Left to right: Major General Michael Gambier-Parry, Dictator Ioannis Metaxas, King George II of Greece, Air Vice Marshal John D'Albiac (RAF) and General Alexandros Papagos.

On 28 December 1940, the Greek GHQ took the decision to halt large-scale offensive operations in view of the stiffening Italian resistance, the worsening supply situation and the bad weather, which inter alia led to a large number of frostbite casualties. This decision took effect on 6 January, whereby only local offensive operations would take place to improve Greek lines until the weather improved. The Italians had eleven infantry divisions, (11th Infantry Division "Brennero", 19th Infantry Division "Venezia", 23rd Infantry Division "Ferrara", 29th Infantry Division "Piemonte", 33rd Infantry Division "Acqui", 37th Infantry Division "Modena", 48th Infantry Division "Taro", 49th Infantry Division "Parma", 51st Infantry Division "Siena", 53rd Infantry Division "Arezzo", and 56th Infantry Division "Casale") and four Alpine divisions (2nd Alpine Division "Tridentina", 3rd Alpine Division "Julia", 4th Alpine Division "Cuneense", and 5th Alpine Division "Pusteria") and the 131st Armored Division "Centauro", with the 6th Infantry Division "Cuneo" and the 7th Infantry Division "Lupi di Toscana" moving to the front. There were also two independent Bersaglieri regiments, a grenadier regiment, two cavalry regiments, Blackshirt and Albanian battalions and other units. According to official Italian documents, on 1 January 1941, Italy had 10,616 officers, 261,850 men, 7,563 vehicles, and 32,871 animals in Albania. This strengthening of the Italian position prompted Cavallero, who after Soddu's recall on 29 December combined his post as Chief of the General Staff with the overall command in Albania, to pronounce that the "period of crisis [was] almost overcome" and to begin planning for an attack aiming to recapture Korçë in early February.

==== Struggle for Klisura Pass and Tepelenë ====
The main operation envisaged by the Greek GHQ was the capture of the Klisura Pass by II Corps, coupled with minor offensives by I Corps and TSDM to improve their positions. II Corps attacked on 8 January, with 1st Division on the left and 15th Division, followed by the 11th Division, on the right flank. The 15th Division faced the Julia Division, and after a hard struggle managed to capture its positions in a costly success. The 11th Division followed up on 9 January next day captured the pass. The offensive forced Cavallero to deploy the reserves he had husbanded for the Korçë offensive, which never took place. The newly arrived Lupi di Toscana division was routed. (Note: Knox called the experience of the Lupi di Toscana Division an example of the failings of the Italian Army in Albania: "recently reconstituted after partial demobilization, it arrived without mules or motor transport, organic artillery, a full complement of headquarters and service troops, and communications equipment. Many of the troops were practically untrained".) The division went into action on 9 January to support the Julia Division, after a 24-hour forced march in horrendous weather, without having time to reconnoitre the front, without maps and without coordinating fire support with the Julia Division. The commander and the chief of staff failed to coordinate its two regiments, which became entangled on the same mule track. Despite attacking downhill and facing a numerically inferior enemy, the division lost a battalion to encirclement and were driven back to their starting positions after two days. By 16 January, the division had disintegrated and "ceased to exist as an organized force", with only 160 officers and men immediately available and over 4,000 casualties. On 26 January, the Italians counter-attacked to recover the pass but II Corps, reinforced with 5th Division, managed to repel them and then counter-attacked. In the Battle of Trebeshina, a series of engagements from 2–12 February, the Trebeshinë massif was captured. The capture of the strategic Klisura pass by the Greek army was considered a major success by the Allied forces, with the Commander of the British forces in the Middle East, Archibald Wavell, sending a congratulatory message to Alexander Papagos.

As the threat of a German invasion from Bulgaria increased, the need to transfer Greek divisions to the Bulgarian frontier forced Papagos to launch a final effort to capture Valona as quickly as possible. The RAF agreed to challenge the air superiority of the Regia Aeronautica, which had recovered with the loss of much of the RHAF in ground-attack operations, rather than continue ineffective attempts at interdiction. With reinforcements from Egypt and the drying of a landing-ground at Paramythia, the RAF managed 200 close support sorties by the end of February. Launched in mid-February, the attack saw I Corps gain ground towards Tepelenë; Italian resistance and a deterioration in the weather forced a suspension of operations before Tepelenë, let alone Valona or Berat, were reached. The Italian defensive success was costly, and signs of an imminent Italian offensive in the central sector of the front forced a return to the defensive.

By early February 1941, the Greek Army was down to less than two months of artillery ammunition overall and had shortages in every area of material, while the Italians possessed ample reserves, endangering their position. The Greeks appealed to the United States for material aid, but the British ensured that they themselves got first priority for US production. Furthermore, there were shortages of materials and even food across the country. Continuing degradation of their logistical capability would soon mean the end of effective Greek resistance. British material and air support had been provided, but at this point it was "relatively small." Further British aid in March and April would only partially alleviate this problem.

On 14 February, in view of GHQ's increasing concern with developments on the Bulgarian frontier, a new higher command, the Epirus Army Section (TSI), under Lieutenant-General Markos Drakos, was formed, comprising I and II Corps. Despite Greek success in Albania, dissension within the Greek leadership emerged over strategy towards the expected German attack and the need for a withdrawal in Albania. The front commanders in Albania represented their views to GHQ in Athens and in early March, Papagos moved to replace virtually the entire leadership in the Albanian front: Drakos, Kosmas and Papadopoulos, the commanders of TSI, I and II Corps respectively, were replaced by the TSDM commander Lieutenant-General Pitsikas, Lieutenant-General Demestichas and Major-General Georgios Bakos, TSDM being taken over by Tsolakoglou.

=== Italian spring offensive ===
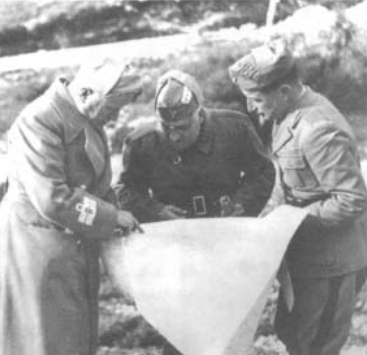
Mussolini (on left) with Italian General Ugo Cavallero (on his right) during the Italian Spring Offensive.

On 4 March, the British sent the first convoy of Operation Lustre with W Force (Lieutenant-General Sir Henry Maitland Wilson) and supplies for Greece. (Note: W Force consisted of the 1st Armoured Brigade and part of the 2nd Support Group of the 2nd Armoured Division, the 6th Australian Division, 7th Australian Division, New Zealand Division and the Independent Polish Brigade Group (the Polish brigade was not dispatched).) The Italian leadership desired to achieve a success against the Greek army before the impending German intervention and reinforced the Albanian front to 28 divisions with an average of 26 serviceable bombers, 150 fighters, along with 134 bombers and 54 fighters of the 4° Squadra in Italy. Cavallero planned an attack on 32 km (20 mi) of the centre of the front, to recapture Klisura and advance towards Leskovik and Ioannina. The attack would be carried out by the VIII Army Corps (24th Infantry Division "Pinerolo", 38th Infantry Division "Puglie", and 59th Infantry Division "Cagliari"), with XXV Corps (2nd Infantry Division "Sforzesca", 47th Infantry Division "Bari", 51st Infantry Division "Siena", and 7th Infantry Division "Lupi di Toscana") as a second echelon, and the Centauro and Piemonte divisions as general reserves. The Greek units opposite them were II Corps (17th, 5th, 1st, 15th, and 11th Divisions), with three regiments as TSI's general reserve, and 4th Division providing reinforcement. II Corps continued limited offensive action as late as 8 March to improve its positions.

The Italian attack, watched by Mussolini, began on 9 March, with a heavy artillery barrage and air bombardment; on the main sector, held by the Greek 1st Division, over 100,000 shells were dropped on a 6 km (4 mi) front. Despite repeated assaults and heavy shelling, the positions of 1st Division held during 9–10 March. A flanking manoeuvre on 11 March ended in Italian defeat. The exhausted Puglie Division was withdrawn and replaced with the Bari Division during the subsequent night, but all attacks until 15 March failed. The Italian offensive halted on 16–18 March, allowing the Greeks to bring reserves forward and begin a gradual reshuffle their line, relieving the 1st Division with the 17th. The Italian offensive resumed on 19 March with another attack on Height 731 (the 18th thus far). Attacks, preceded by heavy artillery bombardments, followed daily until 24 March, the last day of the Italian offensive, without achieving any result. Mussolini admitted that the result of the Italian offensive was zero. Italian casualties amounted to over 11,800 dead and wounded, while the Greeks suffered 1,243 dead, 4,016 wounded and 42 missing in action.

=== Greek and Italian logistical situation in early 1941 ===
Although it failed, the Italian spring offensive revealed a "chronic shortage of arms and equipment" in the Greek Army. Even with British support, the Greeks were fast approaching the end of their logistical tether. British intelligence estimated that Greece's reserves, although numbering 200,000–300,000 partly-trained men on paper, could not be mobilized for lack of arms and equipment, which were being consumed by the Albanian front. By the end of March 1941, the Greek Army possessed one month's supply in various types of artillery ammunition. The British had already supplied, among other goods, 40 million 7.92 rounds and 150 mortars (50 51mm and 100 76mm) the previous month, but had not yet fulfilled the Greeks' mid-January request of 300,000 uniforms and sets of shoes.

The Italians still had reserves of men and materiel, the Greek defences of Macedonia and Thrace, which would face the German attack, were left undermanned and underequipped due to the demands of the Albanian front. The Eastern Macedonia Army Section (TSAM), which manned the Metaxas Line, was left with only 70,000 men to defend against any potential German advance, though plans called for the fortifications to be held by 200,000 men. British planners disagreed with the Greek plan to hold on to the Metaxas Line, as well as the insistence of not ceding a single bit of ground to the Italians, noting that the Greek forces were insufficient to prevent or resist a German breakthrough. The Central Macedonia Army Section (TSKM), which manned the Yugoslav border, was even weaker: its three divisions were recently raised from reserves and possessed no anti-air weaponry, anti-tank weaponry, armored vehicles, or almost any motor vehicles. They had few automatic weapons and faced even shortages of basic supplies such as tents and helmets. 14 out of the 20 available divisions of the Greek army were facing the Italians on the Albanian front as part of the Epirus Army Section, totaling 33 regiments. In an effort to keep Greece in the fight, British aid drastically stepped up in March and April, which included uniforms, weapons, and ammunition of various types. However, the Greeks still did not consider this sufficient for successfully prosecuting the rest of the war.

Though the Greek forces faced logistical difficulties their supply lines worked much better. On the other side, Italian supplies and ammunition faced critical levels even after one month of military operations. In general Italian logistics failed to keep up with the confusing movements of the Italian units, as a result they were perennially lacking essential supplies. Italian General Gabriele Nasci realized that the Greek units were far more familiar in mountain warfare and could always employ local guides and provisions, thus freeing them from concern with supply line and enable them to attack in more flexible way. Indeed, the area that the conflicts took place was far more familiar to the Greek soldiers than to the Italians. The Greek side was far more familiar in mountain warfare considering also the fact that many Greeks especially those natives of Epirus were fighting for their homes. Additionally some Greek weapons were superior to their Italian counterparts: the Hotchkiss machine gun outperformed the Italian Breda and Fiat equivalent and was less liable to overheating as well as jammed less often. The Skoda 75 mm and 105 mm mountain artillery of the Greek army was also superior compared to Italian mortars.

As such at 29 March, Italian General Mario Roatta, Chief of the Italian General Staff, asked for German intervention to relieve the pressure on his own formations. On the other hand, just before the German intervention at April 1941, Greek, British and Yugoslav officers agreed that a joined Greek-Yugoslavian operation would force the Italians back to the Adriatic. Orders given by General Papagos dictated the advance of the Epirus Army towards Vlore and Berat, while the West Macedonia Army would cut the remaining Italian units located in Elbasan and Durrës. Additionally, Papagos advised the Yugoslav side to advance in the direction of Durrës, Kukes and Elbasan. A swift Italian defeat would free up forces that could be used for the defence of Macedonia against a German threat.

=== German intervention and Italian second spring offensive ===
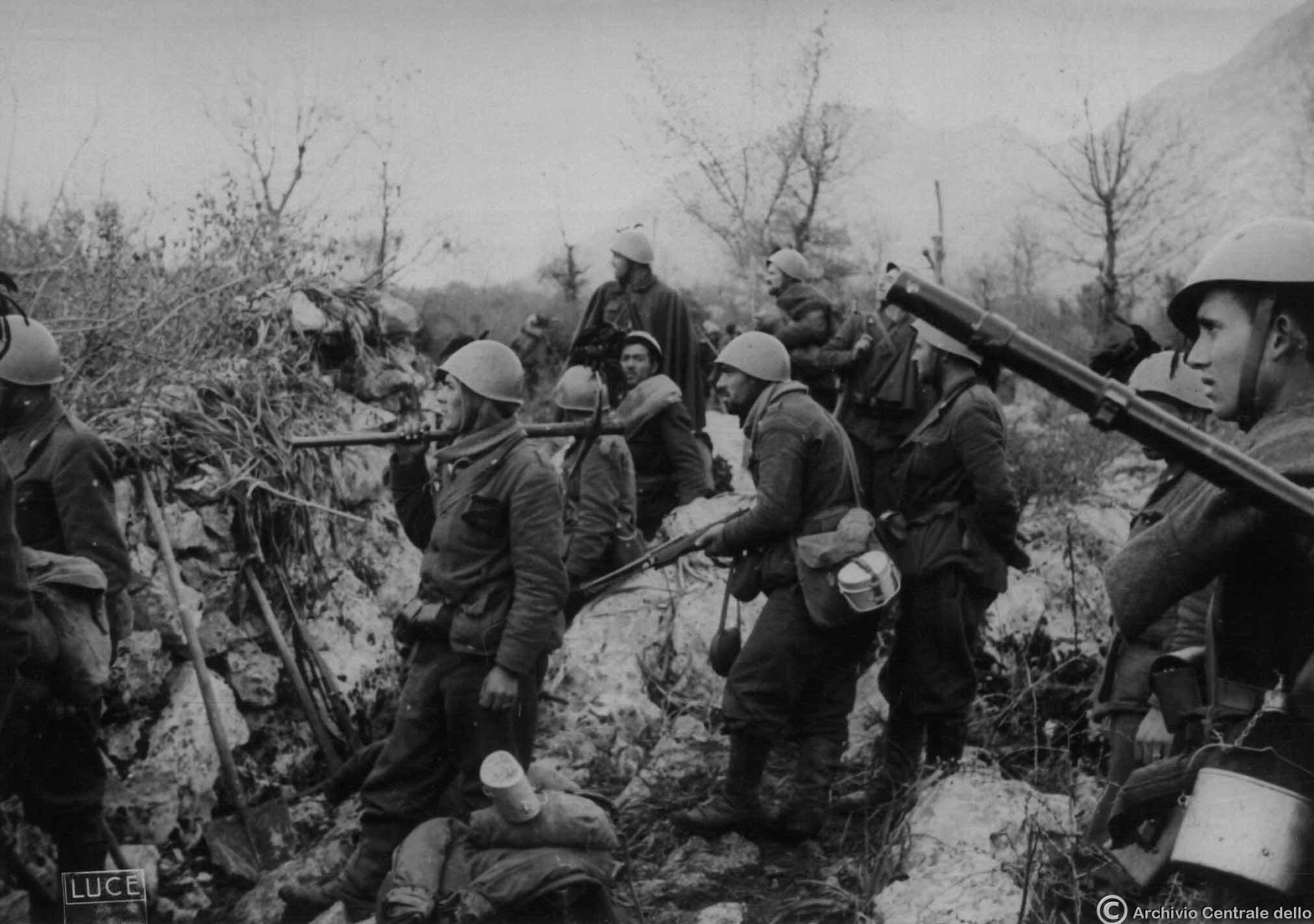
Italian soldiers at the front, April 1941.

With most of the Greek army on the Albanian front, Operation Marita began through Bulgaria on 6 April, which created a second front. Greece had received a small reinforcement from British forces based in Egypt in anticipation of the German attack, but no more help was sent after the invasion. The Greek army was outnumbered; the Bulgarian defensive line did not receive adequate troop reinforcements and was quickly overrun. The Germans outflanked the immobile Greek forces on the Albanian border, forcing the surrender of the Eastern Macedonia Field Army section in only four days. The British Empire forces began a retreat. For several days Allied troops contained the German advance on the Thermopylae position, allowing ships to be prepared to evacuate the British force. The Germans reached Athens on 27 April and the southern shore on 30 April, capturing 7,000 British troops. The conquest of Greece was completed with the capture of Crete a month later and Greece was occupied by the military forces of Germany, Italy, and Bulgaria until late 1944.

On 6 April, Papagos ordered TSDM to launch an attack towards Elbasan, in conjunction with Yugoslav forces. The attack began on 7 April and the 13th Division made some progress, but the Yugoslav army, attacked by the Germans, rapidly collapsed and the operation was cancelled. On 12 April, GHQ in Athens ordered the Greek forces on the Albanian front to retreat but the decision was too late. The Greek commanders knew that Italian pressure, the lack of motor transport and pack animals, the physical exhaustion of the Greek army, and the poor transport network of Epirus meant that any retreat was likely to end in disintegration. Advice to retreat before the start of the German attack had been rejected and they petitioned Pitsikas to surrender. Pitsikas forbade such talk, but notified Papagos and urged a solution that would secure "the salvation and honour of our victorious Army". The order to retreat, the disheartening news of the Yugoslav collapse, and the rapid German advance in Macedonia led to a breakdown of morale in the Greek troops, many of whom had been fighting without rest for five months and were forced to abandon hard-won ground. By 15 April, the divisions of II Army Corps, beginning with the 5th Division, began to disintegrate, with men and even entire units abandoning their positions.

With the advantage of German advance on Greece. On 13 April, General Ugo Cavallero ordered the Italian 9th Army (General Alessandro Pirzio Biroli) and the 11th Army (General Carlo Geloso) to pursuit the retreating Greek units in Albania. The Italian advance was slowed due to the Greek rearguard actions left by the retreating Greek forces. Koritsa was reached on 14 April, Bilishti on 15 April, but Erseke fell on 17 April due to the stiff Greek resistance, Klisura also fell on the same day. The Italian offensive pushed towards Leskovik to Ponte Perati, where the vanguards of the 47th Infantry Division 'Bari' encountered stiff Greek resistance. Which was taken before the armistice. Cavallero desired of a combined action which would encircle the Greek forces in Epirus, but this was beyond the capacity of the Italian forces. The XXV Army Corps entered Greek territory on 21 April.

=== Armistice ===
On 16 April, Pitsikas reported to Papagos that signs of disintegration had also begun to appear among the divisions of I Corps and begged him to "save the army from the Italians" by allowing it to capitulate to the Germans, before the military situation collapsed completely. On the following day TSDM was renamed III Army Corps and placed under Pitsikas' command. The three corps commanders, along with the metropolitan bishop of Ioannina, Spyridon, pressured Pitsikas to unilaterally negotiate with the Germans. When he refused, the others decided to bypass him and selected Tsolakoglou, as the senior of the three generals, to carry out the task. Tsolakoglou delayed for a few days, sending his chief of staff to Athens to secure permission from Papagos. The chief of staff reported the chaos in Athens and urged his commander to take the initiative in a message that implied permission by Papagos, although this was not in fact the case. On 20 April, Tsolakoglou contacted Obergruppenführer Sepp Dietrich, the commander of the nearest German unit, the Leibstandarte SS Adolf Hitler (LSSAH) brigade, to offer surrender. The protocol of surrender was signed by Tsolakoglou and Dietrich at 18:00 on the same day. Presented with the fait accompli an hour later, Pitsikas resigned his command.

The surrender agreement between Greece and Germany sparked protest by Mussolini, as Greece was required to surrender to Italy also. General Wilhelm List then told Mussolini that another surrender agreement would be drawn with the Italians. The surrender agreement was formally signed on 23 April by General Tsolakoglou for Greece, General Alfred Jodl for Germany and General Alberto Ferrero for Italy.

== Sea and air campaign ==
=== Naval operations ===
Thoroughly outclassed by the far larger and more modern Italian Regia Marina, the Royal Hellenic Navy (RHN) was unable to attempt a direct naval confrontation. Its role was rather limited to patrol and convoy escort duties, a particularly important task given the general inadequacy of the Greek transport network on land; apart from large quantities of matériel, c. 80,000 mobilized men and over 100,000 animals were moved by sea during the war. The RHN carried out limited operations against Italian shipping in the Strait of Otranto with submarines (losing one vessel), sinking at least 23,000 tonnes (23,000 long tons) of transport and merchant shipping, but lack of maintenance facilities made it impossible to continue the effort. However, the Greek submarine force was too small to be able to seriously hinder the supply lines between Italy and Albania; between 28 October 1940 and 30 April 1941 Italian ships made 3,305 voyages across the Otranto straits, carrying 487,089 military personnel (including 22 field divisions) and 584,392 tons of supplies while losing overall only seven merchant ships and one escort ship. Destroyers carried out bold but fruitless night raids on 14 November 1940, 15 December and 4 January 1941.

The British fought the Battle of the Strait of Otranto on 12 November acting as a decoy force and the Regia Marina had half of its capital ships put out of action by the British Royal Navy (RN) during the Battle of Taranto (11–12 November) but Italian cruisers and destroyers continued to escort convoys between Italy and Albania. On 28 November, an Italian squadron bombarded Corfu and on 18 December and 4 March, Italian task forces shelled Greek coastal positions in Albania. From January 1941, the main task of the RHN was to escort the convoys of Operation Excess to and from Alexandria, in co-operation with the RN. As the convoys transporting Lustre Force began in early March, the Italian Fleet sortied against them and the British were forewarned by Ultra decrypts. The Mediterranean Fleet intercepted the Italians at the Battle of Cape Matapan on 28 March and sank three cruisers and two destroyers, the greatest Italian naval defeat at sea of the war.

=== Air operations ===
==== Regia Aeronautica ====
The poor infrastructure in Albania air bases hindered communications and movements between the Italian flying units. Only two airfields – Tirana and Valona – had Macadam runways so Autumn and Winter weather made operations more difficult. There was also the usual lack of co-operation with Italian Navy and Army. Two days after the start of the war, on 30 October, there was the first air battle. Some Henschel Hs126s of 3/2 Flight of 3 Observation Mira took off to locate Italian Army columns. But they were intercepted and attacked by Fiat CR.42s of 393^{a} Squadriglia. A first Henschel was hit and crashed, killing its observer, Pilot Officer Evanghelos Giannaris, the first Greek aviator to die in the war. A second Hs 126 was downed over Mount Smolikas, killing Pilot Officer Lazaros Papamichail and Sergeant Constantine Yemenetzis.

==== Royal Hellenic Air Force ====
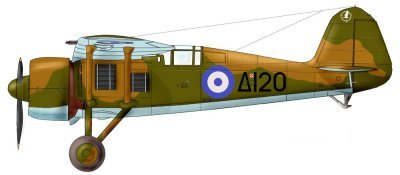
Greek PZL P.24F/G 1940, with the Δ120 marking of Marinos Mitralexis

On 2 November, a squadron of 15 Italian CANT Z.1007 bombers, with Fiat CR.42 fighter escorts headed towards Thessaloniki and was intercepted by Greek PZL P.24 fighters of the 22nd Squadron. The Greek flying ace second lieutenant Marinos Mitralexis shot down one bomber and being out of ammunition, aimed the nose of his PZL P.24 at the tail of a bomber, smashed the rudder and sent the bomber out of control. The news of Mitralexis' feat quickly spread throughout Greece and boosted morale. On 2 December, the 21st Pursuit Squadron re-equipped with 14 ex-RAF Gladiators.

==== RAF ====
Ultra decrypts of orders to the Regia Aeronautica and nightly reports from 4° Zona Aerea Territoriale in Italy to Comando Aeronautico Albania della Regia Aeronautica in Tirana, disclosed bombing targets for the next day and were sent to RAF HQ in Greece, to assist in fighter interception. From mid-November to the end of December, the Blenheim and Wellington bombers from Egypt flew 235 sorties but almost 1/3 failed, due to a lack of all-weather airfields and the season, when flying was possible for about 15 days per month. The bombing effort was concentrated on Durazzo and Valona but some close support operations were carried out and the fighters near Athens helped to reduce the number of Italian raids. By the end of 1940, the Gladiator pilots had claimed 42 aircraft shot down for the loss of six, which established a measure of air superiority over the Pindus mountains. In January 1941, 11 Squadron and 112 Squadron were sent to Greece despite being at half strength. 33 Squadron, 113 Squadron (Blenheims) and 208 Squadron (Lysanders and Hurricanes) moved in March.

The British fighters were able to prevent most Italian air operations after mid-February, when the Greek army made a maximum effort to capture Valona. The RAF managed fifty sorties on 13 and 14 February; Gladiators and Hurricanes intercepted a raid by fifty Italian aircraft on 28 February, the RAF claiming 27 aircraft for the loss of one. When the Greek advance was slowed by more bad weather and Italian reinforcements, the RAF returned to attacks on airfields and ports. On the eve of the German invasion in April, the RAF had claimed 93 Italian aircraft confirmed and 26 probables, for a loss of four pilots and ten aircraft. RAF Greece had been increased to nine squadrons and two Wellington detachments of about 200 aircraft, of which only 80 were serviceable, in support of about 100 Greek and Yugoslav aircraft. RAF losses in the Greek campaign were 163 men killed, missing or prisoner (150 aircrew) and 209 aircraft, 72 in the air, 55 on the ground and 82 destroyed or abandoned during the evacuation.

== Home front ==
=== Greece ===
The war was greeted with great enthusiasm by the Greek population, in Athens crowds filled the streets with patriotic fervour, as newspapers hurried to publish their newest editions to stir up the people further. The popular story that Metaxas had defiantly told Grazzi "ochi!" ("no!") on the night of 28 October 1940 made the previously unpopular prime minister into a national hero. Georgios Vlachos in an editorial in his newspaper Kathimerini wrote: "Today there is no Greek who does not add his voice to the thunderous OCHI. OCHI, we will not hand over Greece to Italy. OCHI, Italian ruffiani will not set foot on our land. OCHI, the barbarians will not desecrate our Parthenon". He also wrote his famous article "The dagger" (To stileto).

Men in Greece rushed to volunteer for the war effort, cramming into the back of trams to get to the recruiting offices. Morale amongst the troops was as high as it could get with a universal feeling that Greece must fight, with few entertaining the idea of failure. This enthusiasm was not shared by some of the political leadership, there was a sense that Greece would lose the war but needed to fight nonetheless, Metaxas stated in a letter to Winston Churchill that "The war we confront today is thus solely a war of honour" and that "The outcome of the world war will not be decided in the Balkans."

The popularity of Metaxas' regime would also receive a boost, with Metaxas becoming a national hero overnight, with even many left-wing and liberal Greeks who opposed Metaxas showing admiration and support for him, flocking to the cause.

Soon, with the first victories at the front, Greek artists started to write and sing patriotic and festive songs. The reputation of Sofia Vembo skyrocketed when her performance of patriotic and satirical songs became a major inspiration for the fighting soldiers as well as the people at large for whom she quickly became a folk heroine. Another satirical popular song named Koroido Mussolini (Mussolini fool) was written by Nikos Gounaris in the rhythm of "Reginella campagnola", a popular Italian song of the era.

=== Italy ===
The announcement of the Italian attack was greeted with favour but not much enthusiasm, by the Italian public. The situation changed as the Italian attack devolved into a stalemate in early November, especially after the British Taranto raid and the start of the Greek counter-offensive. In private conversations, Italians soon took to calling the war in Albania "a second and worse Caporetto". The regime's popularity slumped further with the introduction of strict rationing in food, oil and fats in early December. Despite imposing a price freeze in July, prices rose and the state distribution network of staple foods and heating oil broke down. Coupled with the dismissal of Badoglio and the British advance in North Africa in Operation Compass, it produced "the regime's most serious crisis since the murder of Giacomo Matteotti in 1924" (MacGregor Knox). In a move designed to bolster the Fascist Party's flagging standing, in mid-January 1941 Mussolini ordered the all senior gerarchi and officials under 45 years, to go to the Albanian front (much to their displeasure). According to Dino Grandi at least, this move caused much resentment against Mussolini among the Party leadership that simmered underground and resulted in his dismissal in July 1943.

On the other hand, the Greek historian Zacharias Tsirpanlis observes that while post-war Italian accounts confirm the view that "due to the Greek success Italian public opinion slowly turned against the Fascist regime, marking the beginning of the end for Mussolini", this did not yet materialize in any form of active resistance, including in the front itself. While a cynicism towards the Fascist regime and its symbols and leaders had set in, incidents of insubordination remained isolated. Indeed, according to the eyewitness account of Air Force chief Francesco Pricolo, when Mussolini made an unannounced visit to the front on 2 March 1941, the Duce was himself surprised by the enthusiasm with which he was greeted, having expected open hostility from the soldiers.

=== Albania ===
In an effort to win Albanian support for Italian rule, Ciano and the Fascist regime encouraged Albanian irredentism in the directions of Kosovo and Chameria. Despite Jacomoni's assurances of Albanian support in view of the promised "liberation" of Chameria, Albanian enthusiasm for the war was distinctly lacking. The few Albanian units raised to fight alongside the Italian Army mostly "either deserted or fled in droves". Albanian agents recruited before the war, are reported to have operated behind Greek lines and engaged in acts of sabotage but these were few in number. Support for the Greeks, although of limited nature, came primarily from the local Greek populations who warmly welcomed the arrival of the Greek forces. Despite official Greek proclamations that they were fighting for the liberation of Albania, Greek claims on Northern Epirus were well known. Albanian suspicions were reinforced, when a new municipal council of eleven Greeks and four Albanians was appointed at Korçë, and when the military governor of Gjirokastër prohibited the celebration of the Albanian independence day on 28 November (his counterpart in Korçë allowed it to go ahead and was reprimanded). The Greek authorities even ignored offers of Albanian expatriates to enlist as volunteers against Italy. The Greek occupation regime followed the regulations of international law and the Albanian civil administration was left intact and continued to operate, including law courts. No atrocities were committed and the safes of the state bank were discovered unopened after the Greeks withdrew.

== Aftermath ==
=== Analysis ===
==== Impact on Barbarossa ====
Hitler blamed Mussolini's "Greek fiasco" for his failed campaign in Russia. "But for the difficulties created for us by the Italians and their idiotic campaign in Greece", he commented in mid-February 1945, "I should have attacked Russia a few weeks earlier." Hitler noted when discussing the "pointless campaign in Greece" that Germany was not notified in advance of the impending attack, which "compelled us, contrary to all our plans, to intervene in the Balkans, and that in its turn led to a catastrophic delay in the launching of our attack on Russia. We were compelled to expend some of our best divisions there. And as a net result we were then forced to occupy vast territories in which, but for this stupid show, the presence of our troops would have been quite unnecessary." "We have no luck with the Latin races", he complained afterwards. Mussolini took advantage of Hitler's preoccupation with Spain and France "to set in motion his disastrous campaign against Greece". Andreas Hillgruber has accused Hitler of trying to deflect blame for his country's defeat from himself to his ally, Italy.

Ian Kershaw wrote that the five-week delay in launching Operation Barbarossa, caused by the unusually wet weather in May 1941, was not decisive. For Kershaw, the reasons for the ultimate failure of Barbarossa lay in the arrogance of the German war goals, in particular the planning flaws and resource limitations that caused problems for the operation from the start. He adds that the German invasion into Greece in spring 1941 did not cause significant damage to tanks and other vehicles needed for Barbarossa, the equipment diverted to Greece being used on the southern flank of the attack on the Soviet Union. Von Rintelen emphasizes that although the diversion of German resources into Greece just prior to the attack on the Soviet Union did little for the latter operation, Italy's invasion of Greece did not undermine Barbarossa before the operation started. Instead, Italy's invasion of Greece was to have serious consequences for its ongoing campaign in North Africa. Moreover, Italy would have been in a better position to execute its North African campaign had it initially occupied Tunis and Malta.

==== Effect on Italy ====
In the preface to the collection of documents published in 1965 by the Italian Ministry of Foreign Affairs, the historian and diplomat Mario Toscano summed up the war as follows: "As we all know, the campaign against Greece ended in total failure. This was due, as the published material confirms, to Mussolini's conviction, based on indications he received from his colleagues, that the campaign would be decided in the political rather than the military sector. The consequences of this error were so serious as to bring about Italy's complete subjection to Germany as far as the political and military direction of the war was concerned." This has been echoed by other writers since: Gann and Duignan regarded that the fighting in France, Yugoslavia and Greece reduced Italy to the status of a [German] satellite, while Ian Kershaw considers that the Greek failure, the Battle of Taranto (11–12 November 1940) and the loss of Cyrenaica (9 December 1940 – 9 February 1941) served to end Italian aspirations to great power status.

Other authors have been critical of the Italian leadership's handling of the operation. Jowett wrote in 2000 that Mussolini's "quick and relatively easy victory" turned to defeat and stalemate, which exposed the incompetence of the Fascist government and its war machine. Italian soldiers suffered great hardship in the Albanian mountains, "due to the incompetence and unforgivably bad planning of their leaders". In 2008, Paoletti wrote that the Italian army fought in difficult terrain, was short of clothing and equipment and units were split up as they arrived and used piecemeal. Mussolini was guilty of "criminal improvidence", in causing the great number casualties of the Italian army. The German invasion "went smoothly, because the Greek army was concentrated against the Italians". In 2009, Mazower wrote that the Italian invasion of Greece was a disaster and the "first Axis setback" of the war. Mussolini had sent 140,000 poorly-equipped troops to attack Greece, over some of the worst mountain country in Europe, at the beginning of winter. The Greeks repulsed the invasion, to the surprise of enemies and Allies alike, an event made worse for the Fascist regime because of the attack on Taranto and the disasters in Libya, Eritrea and Ethiopia.

Several military historians have blamed the poor performance of the Italian Army in Greece, as well as in France and North Africa, on "innate defects" that had been evident already during World War I but were consistently ignored due to institutional indifference. The Italian military historian Lucio Ceva remarks that the Italian military was largely unable to learn from its failures or from the enemies it faced; as military historian Brian R. Sullivan points out, it took several decades before the historical office of the Italian General Staff published studies on Italian reverses like Caporetto or Guadalajara. Sullivan also demonstrates that the deficiencies in doctrine, training, leadership, organization and logistics that were apparent during the Spanish Civil War were simply ignored. A typical example is the testing in Spain of the new binary divisions; although they proved "too weak against opponents better armed than the Ethiopians and [...] too inflexible in maneuver", so that the Italian divisions in Spain reverted to the traditional triangular pattern in November 1937, in the very same month, Army chief of staff Pariani insisted on pressing on with the reorganization as the greater number of divisions resulting from it "would give Fascist Italy the appearance of greater military power". The diversion of large quantities of material and funds to the Spanish intervention also impacted the Italian Army negatively: according to the official Italian history of the conflict, the material left in or donated to Spain would have sufficed to provide for 55 fully equipped divisions in June 1940, rather than the 19 fully and 34 partially equipped ones in reality.

According to James Sadkovich, the effect of the Italo-Greek war has been exaggerated by other authors, because Axis victories in the spring of 1941 cancelled the Italian defeats of the previous winter. However, even he admits the adverse effect that the start of the Greek campaign had on Italy's war already under way in North Africa. Between October 1940 and May 1941, five times as many men, one and a third times as much matériel, three and a half times more merchant ships and at least twice the amount of escort vessels were deployed on the Greek operation as in North Africa. As a result, the initial numerical superiority that the Italians enjoyed over the British in the region, was not to last. Graziani deferred his advance, aware that Italian strength was insufficient to mount the major offensive through Egypt that Mussolini was urging and expecting. The Germans saw the importance of the sector and offered troops and equipment. The Comando Supremo wanted to take advantage of the offer. It could have made the difference but Mussolini refused.

==== Impact on Greece ====
Anti-Italian feeling among the Greek public, already strong, reached its peak after the sinking of Elli on 15 August 1940, the day of the Dormition of the Mother of God, a major Orthodox religious holiday. (Note: "Undoubtedly a solid anti-Italian sentimental substratum had developed among public opinion, despite the conventional propriety that the dictatorship of Metaxas was trying to maintain. Following the torpedoing of "Еlli", on 15 August 1940 at Tinos, on the nameday of the Virgin Mary, the sentimental charging, in combination with the injustice and the insult to the Orthodox religious tradition, reached its peak.") Greek optimism that the Italian attack would fail was evident from the first moments of the war. Besides, official propaganda, as well as the spontaneous reaction of the people created the optimism which was necessary for the first difficult moments. From the first hours of the war a strong national feeling was quite evident "to teach a lesson to the macaroni-boys" (Greek: Μακαρονάδες, "Makaronades"), as the Italians were pejoratively called. (Note: Carr, 2013, p. 39: "At 6.00 am air raid sirens woke the Athenians who quickly filled the streets and squares in a paroxism of patriotic fervor. Newspapers rushed out special Monday morning editions with screaming headlines and ecstatic editorials whipping up public enthusiasm- if it really needed whipping up- for a stern lesson to be delivered to the 'macaroni-boys' (makaronades) ...") Various factors have contributed to the high morale of the Greek side and the subsequent repulsion of the Italian attacks: the strong belief in a just cause, the specialized and well trained military personnel of the Greek army and its leadership, as well as the devotion of the civilian population who lived next to the battlefields, including women, children and the elderly, to the Greek cause. (Note: The optimism of the Greek rank and file reinforced by his ignorance which "did not cause any hesitation"; the familiar smile of the soldier; his satisfactory training; the adequately organized mobilization; the strong feeling of justice which had been deceitfully and crudely offended by a coarse Italian propaganda; the capable NCOs and officers, from the rank of platoon leader to that of regiment or division commander who reacted adroitly and very quickly carried out successful decisions, whether they concerned artillery firing or mortar shots or the capture of strategic points; the biological superiority of mountain or rural population (especially people from Epirus, Roumeli, Macedonia, Thessaly), which made up the biggest mass of the infantry forces; the complete devotion of the non-combatant people (women, old people and children) living on the border line (of Epirus and Western Macedonia); the extremely unfavorable weather conditions, which hindered both sides equally, but which were more adverse for the attacker. These are, I believe, the most important factors which made a joint contribution to a profound psychological transformation, which changed the defender into a ruthless attacker, regardless of any sacrifice, at any cost.) Public opinion in Greece still accepts that the failure of the numerically superior Italian army came as a result of its unjustified action against Greece. (Note: "Still, inexorable questions are put forth to the historian: what is the content, finally, of the "miracle" or of those glorious days of war in Albania if the Greek victors defeated an easy enemy, whose superiority in numbers and arms seemed to play a completely unimportant role. Strong proof of that optimistic over-simplification of probably the most serious factor, which has to do with the justification or non-justification of a military conflict, has survived up to date among the Greek public opinion: that is, that the Italian "macaronis" took to their heels and the Greeks nearly threw them into the sea.")

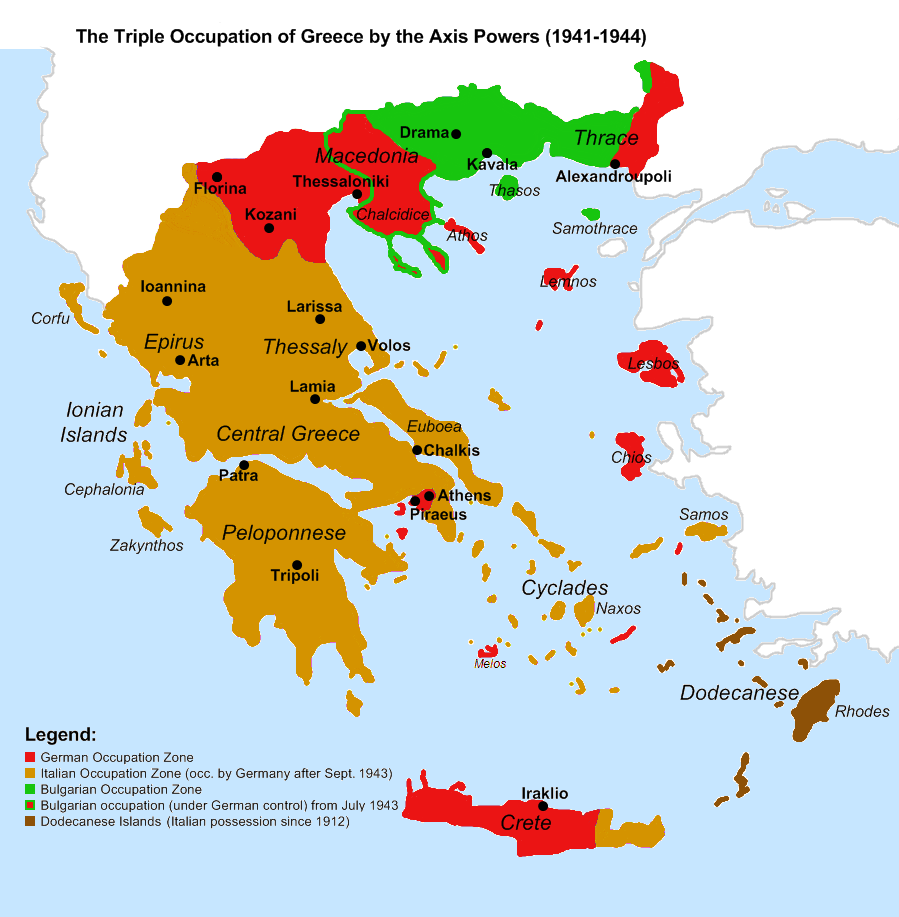
The three occupation zones. Italian German annexed by Bulgaria. The Italian zone was taken over by the Germans in September 1943.

After the Italian troops were driven from Greek soil, Greek morale was further strengthened. The unpublished and unknown up to now documents (memoranda, letters, plans) of Ubaldo Soddu (who did not write memoirs), Commander of the Italian forces in Albania from 10 November to 30 December 1940, reveal the desperate efforts for control, the strict measures for unjustified retreats and abandonment of positions, the tragic appeal even for German help (on 24 November and 17 December). In his reports, Soddu analysed Greek offensive tactics and the bravery and the moral strength of the enemy, during this period from November–December, the Greeks used no new method of military tactics or quickly took advantage of the land left back by the Italian retreat. Mussolini, after the capture of Himara by the Greeks, wrote of the high morale that contributed to the victory of the enemy (24 December). The Greek successes against Italy helped raise morale in Allied Europe and showed that the Axis were not invincible. Inspired by these military developments, British Prime Minister Winston Churchill declared that "today we say that Greeks fight like heroes, from now on we will say that heroes fight like Greeks".

In 2007, Fisher wrote that although the advance of the Greek army stalled at January 1941, due to harsh winter conditions and Italian reinforcements, Greece had managed to secure a strong bridgehead in southern Albania (Northern Epirus to the Greeks). Thus, it not only delivered a humiliation to Mussolini, but also occupied an area inhabited by a substantial ethnic Greek population,

As the only active ally of Britain fighting in Europe, Greece, overcoming its comparative disadvantage, provided the first victory against the Axis forces ... Greek advances stalled in early January 1941, falling victim to the harsh winter and to Italian reinforcements. Nonetheless, the strong positioning of Greek forces in southern Albania provided not only humiliation for Mussolini but also an unexpected gain for Greece, which now occupied an area inhabited by many Greeks that had been relegated to Albanian rule after the First World War.

— Fisher

The Greco-Italian War is viewed as a triumph in Greece and often referred to as "the Epic of 40" ("Το Έπος του '40") and 28 October, the day Metaxas rejected the Italian ultimatum, is a national holiday known as Ohi Day (Greek: Επέτειος του Όχι, Anniversary of the 'No').

==== German opinion ====
The difficulty Italy encountered in subduing a minor power such as Greece further lowered the opinion among the Germans of their Italian allies. German SS-Oberst-Gruppenführer Sepp Dietrich labeled the Albania campaign as one of the three "great disasters [that have] deprived the Italian Army of its former confidence", along with the Italian invasion of France and Operation Compass. He bitterly noted: "For this attack they used troops from Southern Italy - the opposite of what was needed for a winter campaign in mountainous country, without proper equipment, over an impracticable terrain, and without any organization in depth!". Wilhelm Keitel, commenting about the end of the campaign, said that "this miserable spectacle, laid on by our gallant ally, must have produced some hollow laughter from the Greeks."

In his public address to the Reichstag following the conclusion of the Balkan Campaign, Hitler was complimentary to the Greeks for their "extremely brave resistance", but stated that given the Greek logistical situation, German involvement was not decisive in the Greco-Italian conflict: "The Duce... was convinced that a quick decision would be arrived at one way or another in the forthcoming season. I was of the same opinion." He stated that he had no quarrel with Greece (which he had acknowledged as part of the Italian sphere anyway) and that his intervention was aimed solely at the British as he suspected that they planned to set up a threat to his rear in the vein of the Salonika front of the First World War: "the German forces, therefore, represented no assistance to Italy against Greece, but a preventive measure against the British." He further noted that, by the beginning of April, the Albanian campaign against the Italians "had so weakened [Greece] that its collapse had already become inevitable", and credited the Italians with having "engaged the greater part of the Greek Army." However, privately, he expressed the opposite sentiment, remarking that "Italy would never have defeated the Greeks" without German help. In Hitler's Table Talk, in April 1942, the following statement is also attributed to him: "It is equally impossible to imagine what might have happened if the Italian front had not been stabilized in Albania, thanks to Mussolini; the whole of the Balkans would have been set alight at a moment when our advance towards the southeast was still in its early stages."

=== Casualties ===
The Italian invasion began with a force of about 87,000 men and was increased to about 565,000 troops, supported by 463 aircraft and 163 light tanks. Italian forces suffered casualties of 13,755 killed, 50,874 wounded and 25,067 missing (of whom 21,153 were taken prisoner), for a total of 89,696 losses in action and 52,108 sick, 12,368 frostbite cases for a grand total of 154,172 casualties. Eighteen ships of the Regia Marina were sunk. The Regia Aeronautica had 79 aircraft destroyed (65 shot down) and more than 400 damaged, with 229 aircrew killed, while claiming 218 kills against Greek and British and 55 probables. Greek military forces amounted to fewer than 260,000 men with casualties of 13,325 killed, 42,485 wounded, 1,237 missing and 1,531 prisoners, for a total of 58,578 losses and c. 25,000 frostbite cases, a grand total of about 83,578 casualties. The RHAF lost between 52 and 77 aircraft. (In Operation Marita, the Germans took 244,000 Yugoslav, 218,000 Greek and 9,000 British prisoners.)

In January 2018, following an agreement between the Greek and Albanian foreign ministers, a systematic effort to recover the bodies of fallen Greek soldiers from the war was undertaken between Greece and Albania. It is estimated that between 6,800 and 8,000 fallen Greek soldiers were hastily buried on location following their death, and their remains not properly identified. Work by joint Greek-Albanian teams began on 22 January in the Kelcyre Gorge, site of the Battle of Kleisoura Pass. A small number of Cham Albanian activists tried to disrupt the work but were removed by Albanian police. The remains of the Greek soldiers will be buried in the Greek military cemeteries in the Kelcyre Gorge and in the Greek minority village of Bularat (Vouliarates) near the Greek–Albanian border.

=== Occupation of Greece ===
On 13 April, Hitler issued Directive 27, including his occupation policy for Greece and jurisdiction in the Balkans with Directive No. 31 (9 June). Italy occupied the bulk of the mainland, German forces occupied Athens, Thessaloniki, Central Macedonia and several Aegean islands, including most of Crete and Florina, subject of disputed claims by Italy and Bulgaria. Bulgaria, which had not participated in the invasion, occupied most of Thrace on the same day that Tsolakoglou surrendered, taking the territory between the Strymon river and a line through Alexandroupoli and Svilengrad west of the Evros River. Italian troops took over their zone of occupation from 28 April to 12 June.
