= Emanuele Grazzi =

Diplomat and journalist

Italian ambassador to Guatemala
- In office October 27, 1932 – 1934
- Preceded by: Carlos F. Novella
- Succeeded by: Enrico Bombieri (1887-1967)

Italian ambassador to Greece
- In office 1939 – November 7, 1940
- Preceded by: Giulio Cesare Montagna
- Succeeded by: Casto Caruso

Italian ambassador to Serbia
- In office 1941 – September 30, 1943
- Preceded by: Filippo Anfuso
- Succeeded by: Giovanni Caracciolo di Vietri

Italian ambassador to Hungary
- In office September 30, 1943 – October 15, 1943
- Preceded by: Giuseppe Talamo Atenolfi di Castelnuovo 1896-1983
- Succeeded by: Augusto Assettati

Personal details
- Born: May 30, 1891 Florence, Kingdom of Italy
- Died: September 7, 1961 (aged 70) Rome, Italy
- Occupation: Diplomat

Emanuele Grazzi (30 May 1891 - 7 September 1961) was an Italian diplomat and writer. He was the Italian ambassador to Greece during World War II, delivering Benito Mussolini's ultimatum to Greek prime minister Ioannis Metaxas on 28 October 1940. The refusal of Italian demands led to the beginning of the Greco-Italian War and Greece's joining of World War II.

== Biography ==
Grazzi was born in Florence on 30 May 1891. He graduated in law from the University of Pisa in 1911.

He was appointed Consular Attaché and sent to Tunis in 1912. He returned to the Ministry in 1913 and was subsequently sent to Helsingfors, first as Italian delegate and then as chargé d'affaires in the Inter-Allied Economic Committee (1919). He then served in Berlin becoming Regent of the Consulate in 1920 and was then appointed Consul in Florianópolis in 1922. In 1924 he returned to the Ministry. He was transferred to Toulouse in 1925 and in 1927 to New York as Consul General.

He was chargé d'affaires in Guatemala in 1932, and returned to the Ministry in 1934 to work for the Press and Propaganda. He was appointed Director General of the Foreign Press Service in 1935. In 1939 he was transferred to Athens. On 28 October 1940, following instructions received, he presented an ultimatum to General Ioannis Metaxas, Prime Minister and Greek dictator, in which Mussolini demanded that all of Greece be occupied by Italian troops. He was later recalled to the Ministry. In 1943 he was sent to Belgrade.

In 1944 he joined the Italian Social Republic and was sent to Budapest, where he stayed only a few days. He left his career at the end of 1947.

He died in 1961.

== See also ==
- Ministry of Foreign Affairs (Italy)
- Foreign relations of Italy
