= List of Hellenic Army generals =

This list is for people who held general officer rank (including, after 1946, Brigadier General) in the regular Hellenic Army since 1828. It does not include the numerous generals of the irregular troops appointed during the Greek War of Independence, unless they also received a general rank in the post-war regular army. This list is not complete – please add to it if you know of any omissions.

== A ==
Rank	Name	Born	Died	Notes
Lieutenant General	Prince Andrew	1882	1944	Commander of II Corps (1921–22), V Corps (1922)
General	King Alexander	1893	1920	Held the rank of General as King of Greece (1917–20)
Lieutenant General	Panagiotis Anagnostopoulos	1918		Chief of the Central Intelligence Service (1965)
General	Odysseas Angelis	1912	1987	Chief of the Armed Forces (1967–73), Vice President of the Republic (1973)
General	Dionysios Arbouzis	1912	1987	Commander of the Greek Battalion in Korea and ELDYK, Chief of the Armed Forces (1974–76)

== B ==
Rank	Name	Born	Died	Notes
Lieutenant General	Konstantinos Bakopoulos	1889	1950	Commander of Eastern Macedonia Army Section (1941)
Major General	Georgios Bakos	1892	1946	Commander of 3rd Division (1940–41), Defence Minister in the collaborationist government (1941–43)
Major General	Kostas Botsaris	1792	1853	Fighter in the Greek War of Independence, Senator

== C ==
Rank	Name	Born	Died	Notes
Lieutenant General	Anastasios Charalambis	1862	1949	Chief of the Army Staff Service (1917), Commander of II Corps (1918), Prime Minister, Minister of Military Affairs (1922)
Lieutenant General	Aristeidis Chasapidis	1875	1941	Commander of 10th & 8th Divisions, II Corps. Chief of the Army General Staff (1935–36)
Major General	Nikolaos Christodoulou	1863	1924	
General	Richard Church	1784	1873	British military officer, commander-in-chief of the Greek forces during the last stages of the Greek War of Independence, Secretary of Military Affairs (1835) Senator
Field Marshal	King Constantine I	1868	1923	Lt. General as Crown Prince and Inspector-General of the Army until 1913, commander-in-chief of the Greek Army in the Greco-Turkish War of 1897 and the Balkan Wars. General and soon after Field Marshal as King of Greece (1913–17, 1920–22)
Field Marshal	King Constantine II	1940		Held the rank of Field Marshal as King of Greece (1964–73)

== D ==
Rank	Name	Born	Died	Notes
Lieutenant General	Konstantinos Damianos	1853	1915	Commander of 3rd Division (1911–13), IV Corps (1914–15)
Lieutenant General	Panagiotis Danglis	1853	1924	Chief of the Army General Staff (1912), Commander of V Corps (1913–14), member of the "Triumvirate of National Defence", leader of the Liberal Party
General	Ioannis Davos	1918	2008	Commander of III Corps (1973–74), Chief of the Army General Staff (1974–76) and the Armed Forces Command (1976–80)
Lieutenant General	Nikolaos Delagrammatikas	1853	1938	Commander of 6th and 8th Divisions (1912–13)
Lieutenant General	Panagiotis Demestichas	1885	1960	Commander of I Corps (1940, 1941), V Corps (1940–41), Interior Minister in the collaborationist government (1941)
Lieutenant General	Dimosthenis Dialetis	1869	1954	Chief of the Greek Gendarmerie (1928)
Major General	Kimon Digenis	1871	1945	Commander of 13th Division (1920–21) and II Corps (1921–22)
Lieutenant General	Viktor Dousmanis	1861	1949	Chief of the field staff in the Balkan Wars, Chief of the Army General Staff (1914–16, 1921, 1922)
Lieutenant General	Nikolaos Douvas	1947		Chief of the Army General Staff (2004–06)
Lieutenant General	Konstantinos Dovas	1898	1973	Chief of the National Defence General Staff (1954–59), interim Prime Minister (1961)
Lieutenant General	Markos Drakos	1888	1975	Commander of Epirus Army Section (1941)
Lieutenant General	Antonis Drosogiannis	1922	2006	Deputy and Alternate Minister of National Defence (1981–86), Minister of Public Order (1986–88)

== E ==
Rank	Name	Born	Died	Notes
Major General	Athanasios Exadaktylos	1869	1936	Deputy Chief of the Army Staff Service, Chief of Staff of the Interior Army (1921)
Lieutenant General	Joseph-Paul Eydoux			French Army general, head of the French military mission (1911–14)

== F ==
Rank	Name	Born	Died	Notes
Lieutenant General	Evangelos Florakis	1943	2002	Commander of II Corps (1999–2000), and the Cypriot National Guard (2000–02)
Lieutenant General	Frangoulis Frangos	1951		Chief of the Army General Staff (2009–11), Minister for National Defence (2012)
Lieutenant General	Athanasios Frangou	1864	1923	Commander of 1st Division (1920–22) and of the "Southern Group" (August 1922)

== G ==
Rank	Name	Born	Died	Notes
Lieutenant General	Ioannis Gennimatas	1910	1981	Chief of the Army General Staff (1964–65)
General	King George I	1845	1913	Held the rank of General as King of Greece (1863–1913)
Field Marshal	King George II	1890	1947	Held the rank of General, and from 1939 of Field Marshal, as King of Greece (1922–24, 1935–47)
Lieutenant General	Dimitrios Giatzis	1891	1964	Commander of 9th Infantry Division (1945), I Corps (1946–47), First Army (1947), Chief of the Army General Staff (1947–49)
Lieutenant General	Solon Gikas	1898	1978	Chief of the Army General Staff (1954–56), Minister for Public Works (1958–63), Minister for Public Order (1974–76)
General	Phaedon Gizikis	1917	1999	Commander of First Army and Military Commander of Athens during the Regime of the Colonels, President of the Republic (1973–74)
Lieutenant General	Stylianos Gonatas	1876	1966	As a colonel, one of the leaders of the 11 September 1922 Revolution. Prime Minister of the Revolutionary Government (1922–24), Senator and President of the Senate, Minister for Public Works. Awarded the rank of Lt. General by the National Assembly in 1924.
General	Dimitrios Grapsas	1948		Chief of the Army General Staff (2006–07), Chief of the National Defence General Staff (2007–09)
General	Agamemnon Gratsios	1922	1993	Chief of the Army General Staff (1976–80), Chief of the National Defence General Staff (1980–82)
Major General	Neokosmos Grigoriadis	1879	1967	
General	Georgios Grivas	1898	1974	Cypriot-born officer, leader of the royalist Organization X, leader of EOKA against British rule in Cyprus (1955–59), awarded the rank of General in retirement by the Greek Parliament. Held active rank as commander of the Cypriot National Guard (1964–67), leader of EOKA B against Archbishop Makarios (1967–74)
Lieutenant General	Theodoros Grivas	1797	1862	

== H ==
Rank	Name	Born	Died	Notes
Lieutenant General	Emmanuel Han	1801	1867	
Lieutenant General	Georgios Hatzianestis	1863	1922	Commander of the Army of Asia Minor (May–August 1922). Tried and executed as responsible for the Asia Minor Disaster in the Trial of the Six.
Major General	Christos Hatzimichalis	1866		Commander of II Corps (1922–23)
Major General	Christodoulos Hatzipetros	1798	1869	Fighter in the Greek War of Independence, aide-de-camp to Kings Otto and George I
Major General	Christos Hatzipetros	1873	1945	

== I ==
Rank	Name	Born	Died	Notes
Major General	Dimitrios Ioannidis	1923	2010	One of the leaders of the Regime of the Colonels, head of the Greek Military Police (1967–73). De facto dictator from November 1973 until the junta's overthrow in August 1974, when he was forcibly retired. Tried and convicted of high treason to life imprisonment.
Lieutenant General	Dimitrios Ioannou	1861	1926	Commander of the Archipelago Division (1916–18), I Corps (1918–19), Smyrna Army Corps (1919–20)

== K ==
Rank	Name	Born	Died	Notes
Lieutenant General	Stylianos Kalfelis	1950		Inspector-General of the Army (2006–09)
Lieutenant General	Konstantinos Kallaris	1858	1940	Commander of the 2nd Division (1911–13), I Corps (1914), Minister of Military Affairs (1916)
Major General	Dimitrios Kallergis	1803	1867	Fighter in the Greek War of Independence, one of the leaders of the 3 September 1843 Revolution. Minister for Military Affairs (1853–55).
Lieutenant General	Andreas Kallinskis-Roïdis	1868		
Lieutenant General	Spyridon Karaiskakis	1826	1899	Minister for Military Affairs (1875–76, 1878, 1880, 1882), MP
Lieutenant General	Vasileios Kardamakis	1900	1971	Chief of the Army General Staff (1959–62)
Major General	Georgios Katechakis	1881	1939	MP and Senator, Minister for Military Affairs (1924, 1930–32), Governor-General in Thrace (1922–23) and Crete (1928–30)
Lieutenant General	Dimitrios Katheniotis	1882	1947	Chief of the Army General Staff (1933–35)
Lieutenant General	Charalambos Katsimitros	1886	1962	Commander of the 8th Division (1938–41), Minister of Labour and Agriculture in the collaborationist government (1941)
Major General	Pafsanias Katsotas	1896	1991	Commander of I Greek Brigade at El Alamein, MP and Minister in several portfolios, Mayor of Athens (1954–59)
Major General	Kleomenis Kleomenous	1852		
Major General	Miltiadis Koimisis	1878	1935	
Major General	Gennaios Kolokotronis	1805	1868	Fighter in the Greek War of Independence, aide-de-camp of King Otto and Prime Minister (1862)
Field Marshal	Theodoros Kolokotronis	1770	1843	Klepht leader, he served under the British in the 1800s. One of the main Greek leaders in the Greek War of Independence, as general-in-chief of the Morea. After Independence, he was a political opponent of the regency during King Otto's minority and imprisoned, narrowly escaping execution.
Lieutenant General	Georgios Kondylis	1878	1936	Suppressed the royalist revolt of 1923, overthrew the dictatorship of Theodoros Pangalos in 1926, suppressed the March 1935 Venizelist coup attempt. MP and Minister of Military Affairs (1924, 1926, 1932–33, 1933–35), Prime Minister (1926, 1935). Abolished the Republic on 10 October 1935, restoring the Greek monarchy
Lieutenant General	Alexandros Kontoulis	1858	1933	Commander of I Corps (1921–22), Ambassador to Albania
Lieutenant General	Aristotelis Korakas	1858	1946	Commander of V, III Corps (1917–18), Head of Royal Military Household (1918–20)
Lieutenant General	Georgios Kosmas	1884	1964	Commander of IV, V, I Corps (1940–41), Governor-General in Thrace (1947–48), Chief of the Army General Staff (1949–51)
General	Michail Kostarakos	1956	2023	Chief of the National Defence General Staff (2011–2015)
Lieutenant General	Georgios Koumanakos	1913	2003	
Lieutenant General	Alexandros Kontoulis	1858	1933	Commander of I Corps in the Asia Minor Campaign, Ambassador to Albania
Lieutenant General	Konstantinos Koumoundouros	1846	1924	MP, Minister for Naval Affairs (1890–92), Minister of Military Affairs (1899)

== M ==
Rank	Name	Born	Died	Notes
Major General	Nikolaos Makris	1829	1911	Chief of the Gendarmerie, Commander of 1st Division (1897)
Major General	Ioannis Mamouris	1797	1867	Fighter in the War of Independence
Lieutenant General	Konstantinos Manetas	1879	1960	Chief of the Army General Staff (1931), MP and minister
Lieutenant General	Theodoros Manetas	1881	1947	Chief of the Army General Staff (1931–33), MP and minister
Lieutenant General	Christos Manolas	1959		Chief of the Army General Staff (2014–)
Lieutenant General	Emmanouil Manousogiannakis	1853	1916	Commander of 1st Division in the Balkan Wars, II Corps thereafter
Major General	Manolis Mantakas	1891	1968	Leader of the leftist Cretan Resistance and PEEA member in World War II
Lieutenant General	Dimitrios Matthaiopoulos	1861	1923	Commander of the 5th and 8th Divisions in the Balkan Wars
	Antonios Mavromichalis	1792	1873	Fighter in the War of Independence
Lieutenant General	Alexandros Mazarakis-Ainian	1874	1943	Chief of the Army General Staff (1924–25, 1926–27, 1929–31), minister
Lieutenant General	Konstantinos Mazarakis-Ainian	1869	1949	Fighter in the Macedonian Struggle, Commander of Xanthi Division in the Asia Minor Campaign
Lieutenant General	Vasileios Melas	1879	1956	Commander of Cavalry Division in the Asia Minor Campaign
Lieutenant General	Dimitrios Meletopoulos	1796	1858	Fighter in the War of Independence
Major General	Alexandros Merentitis	1880	1964	Chief of the Army General Staff (1928–29), General Director of the Aviation Ministry (1930–34), Minister
Lieutenant General	Ioannis Metaxas	1871	1941	Chief of the Army General Staff (1915), leading figure of the National Schism, Prime Minister and dictator of the 4th of August Regime (1936–41)
Lieutenant General	Konstantinos Miliotis-Komninos	1869	1949	Commander of 6th Division in the Balkan Wars, and the Army of Asia Minor in the Asia Minor Campaign
Lieutenant General	Konstantinos Moschopoulos	1854	1942	Commander of 4th Division and various divisional groups in the Balkan Wars, III Corps, Chief of the Army General Staff (1916)

== N ==
Rank	Name	Born	Died	Notes
Lieutenant General	Konstantinos Nider	1865	1942	Fighter in the Macedonian Struggle, Commander of 1st Division in the Macedonian front, of the Army of Occupation and the Army of Thrace in the Asia Minor Campaign

== O ==
Rank	Name	Born	Died	Notes
Lieutenant General	Alexandros Othonaios	1879	1970	Fighter in the Macedonian Struggle, Commander of Kydoniai Division (1919–20), II and III Corps (1923–25), Prime Minister in March 1933 emergency cabinet

== P ==
Rank	Name	Born	Died	Notes
Lieutenant General	Konstantinos Pallis	1871	1941	Chief of Staff of Army of Asia Minor (1920–22), Chief of Army General Staff (1940–41)
Lieutenant General	Dimitrios Papadopoulos	1889	1983	Inspector of Artillery (1938–40), Commander of II Corps (1940–41)
Field Marshal	Alexandros Papagos	1883	1955	Minister of Military Affairs (1935), Chief of the Army General Staff (1936–40), Commander-in-Chief of the Army (1940–41, 1949–50), Chief of the National Defense General Staff (1950–51), Prime Minister (1952–55)
Lieutenant General	Leonidas Papagos	1844		
Lieutenant General	Anastasios Papoulas	1857	1935	Commander of the Army of Asia Minor (1920–22)
Lieutenant General	Leonidas Paraskevopoulos	1860	1936	Commander of I Corps (1917–18), Commander-in-Chief of the Army (1918–20), Senator
Field Marshal	King Paul I	1901	1964	
Brigadier General	Stylianos Pattakos	1912	2016	One of the leaders of the 1967 coup, Interior Minister (1967–71, 1973), Deputy Prime Minister (1967–73)
Major General	Christoforos Perraivos	1773	1863	Fighter in the Greek War of Independence
Lieutenant General	Periklis Pierrakos-Mavromichalis	1863	1938	Olympic medallist (1986), Interior Minister (1922–23), Minister for Military Affairs (1924), Senator
Lieutenant General	Ioannis Pitsikas	1881	1975	Commander of I Corps (1940), W. Macedonia Army Section and Epirus Army Section (1940–41), Mayor of Athens (1946–50), Minister of National Defence (1952), Minister for Northern Greece (1961)
Lieutenant General	Nikolaos Plastiras	1883	1953	As Colonel, one of the leaders of the 11 September 1922 Revolution. Prime Minister (1945, 1950, 195–152). Awarded the rank of Lt. General by the National Assembly in 1924.
Lieutenant General	Andreas Platis	1865		Commander of 7th Division (1921–22), Smyrna Superior Military Command (1922)
Lieutenant General	Georgios Polymenakos	1859	1942	Commander of III Corps (1921), Northern Group of Divisions (1921–22)
Lieutenant General	Theodoros Pangalos	1878	1952	Chief of staff of the Army of Asia Minor (1919–20), Commander of the Army of the Evros (1922–23), Prime Minister (1925–26) and President (1926) as dictator
Lieutenant General	Achilleas Protosyngellos	1879	1943	Director-General of the Ministry of Military Affairs (1930–34), Deputy Chief of the Army General Staff (1934–35), Commander of the Supreme War School (1935–36).

== S ==
Rank	Name	Born	Died	Notes
Lieutenant General	Konstantinos Sapountzakis	1846	1931	Chief of the Army General Staff (1906–09), commander of the Army of Epirus (1912–13)
Lieutenant General	Vasileios Sapountzakis	1811	1901	Inspector-General of the Army (1878), Minister of Military Affairs
Major General	Ptolemaios Sarigiannis	1882	1958	Chief of the Army General Staff (1925–26)
Major General	Chrysanthos Sisinis	1857		
Major General	Dimitrios Sisinis	1861		
Major General	Ioannis Sismanis	1859		
Lieutenant General	Konstantinos Skarlatos	1872	1969	
Commander General Colonel	Nikolaos G. Skarvelis	1821?	1858?	Fighter in the Greek War of Independence, Commander of the Athens Infantry in the 3 September 1843 Revolution.
Lieutenant General	Konstantinos Smolenskis	1842	1915	Commander of 1st Division (1897), Minister of Military Affairs (1897, 1903–04)
Lieutenant General	Napoleon Sotilis	1860	1953	Deputy Chief of Army General Staff (1912), Commander of 7th Division (1912–15), V & II Corps (1915–16)
Major General	Spyridon Sotiropoulos	1859		
Lieutenant General	Petros Soumilas	1861	1955	Commander of 12th & 10th Divisions (1920–22), III Corps (1922)
Lieutenant General	Grigorios Spandidakis	1909	1996	Chief of the Army General Staff (1965–67), Deputy PM and Minister of National Defence (1967)
Lieutenant General	Panagiotis Spiliotopoulos	1891	1962	Chief of the Army General Staff (1946–47), Minister for National Defence (1951)
Lieutenant General	Spyromilios	1800	1880	Fighter in the War of Independence, Minister of Military Affairs (1850–53, 1859, 1862, 1867–68)
Lieutenant General	Georgios Stanotas	1888	1965	Commander of the Cavalry Division (1939–41), Peloponnese Mil. Command (1947–48)
Major General	Xenophon Stratigos	1869	1927	Deputy Chief of Army General Staff (1916–17, 1920–21)
Major General	Ioannis Stratos	1793	1848	Fighter in the War of Independence, Major General in the Royal Phalanx

== T ==
Rank	Name	Born	Died	Notes
Major General	Nikos Toskas	1952		Deputy Minister for National Defence (2015), Alternate Minister of Citizen Protection (2015–)
Lieutenant General	Nikolaos Trikoupis	1868	1956	Commander of 3rd Division (1917–18, 1921), II Corps (1921), I Corps (1921–22)
Lieutenant General	Ioannis Trilivas	1868		Commander of 5th Division (1921–22), IV Corps (1927)
Lieutenant General	Thrasyvoulos Tsakalotos	1897	1989	Commander of I and II Corps (1948–49), Chief of the Army General Staff (1951–52)
Major General	Ioannis Tsangaridis	1887	1939	
Lieutenant General	Athanasios Tselios	1956		Chief of the Army General Staff (2013–14)
Lieutenant General	Charalambos Tseroulis	1879	1929	Commander of Archipelago Division (1920), IV Corps (1922–23)
Lieutenant General	Efthymios Tsimikalis	1879	1943	Commander of Crete Division (1920–21), 10th Division (1922–23), IV Corps (1923–25)
Major General	Nikolaos Tsipouras	1880		
Lieutenant General	Vlasios Tsirogiannis	1872	1928	Commander of 3rd & 2nd Division, III Corps (1922–28)
Major General	Christos Tsolakopoulos	1868	1923	Posthumous honorary promotion
Lieutenant General	Georgios Tsolakoglou	1886	1948	Commander of III Corps and W. Macedonia Army Section (1940–41), Collaborationist Prime Minister during the Occupation (1941–43)
Lieutenant General	Georgios Tsontos	1871	1942	

== V ==
Rank	Name	Born	Died	Notes
Major General	Michalis Vardanis	1936	2014	
Major General	Timoleon Vassos	1836	1929	
Lieutenant General	Konstantinos Ventiris	1892	1960	Chief of the Army General Staff (1944, 1947)
Lieutenant General	Étienne de Villaret			French Army general, head of the French military mission (1914)
General	Alexakis Vlachopoulos	1780	1865	Fighter in the War of Independence, Minister of Military Affairs (1841-1843), Member of Parliament (1859)
Lieutenant General	Aristotelis Vlachopoulos	1866	1960	Chief of the Army General Staff (1920–21), Commander of IV Corps (1922)
Lieutenant General	Konstantinos Vlachopoulos	1789	1868	Fighter in the War of Independence, Commander of the Hellenic Gendarmerie
Lieutenant General	Nikolaos Vlachopoulos	1868	1957	Chief of the Army General Staff (1922–24, 1927–28)
Lieutenant General	Nikolaos Vorvolakos	1931	2014	Chief of the Cypriot National Guard (1993–98)
Lieutenant General	Vasileios Vrachnos	1887	1971	Commander of 1st Division (1940)

== Y ==
Rank	Name	Born	Died	Notes
General	Demetrios Ypsilantis	1793	1832	

== Z ==
Rank	Name	Born	Died	Notes
Lieutenant General	Nikolaos Zafeiriou	1871	1947	Commander of 1st Division (1919–20), 3rd Division, II, III and V Corps (1923–1926)
General	Dimitrios Zagorianakos	1918	1977	Chief of the Army Command (1972–73) and the Armed Forces Command (1973)
Major General	Nikolaos Zervas	1800	1869	Fighter in the Greek War of Independence
Major General	Ioannis Zisis		1941	Commander of Evros Brigade (1941)
General	Georgios Zoitakis	1910	1996	Commander of III Corps (1966–67), Regent (1967–1972)
Lieutenant General	Emmanouil Zymvrakakis	1861	1928	
Lieutenant General	Emmanouil Zymvrakakis	1856	1931	
Lieutenant General	Epameinondas Zymvrakakis	1863	1922	
