= Vlachopoulos =

Vlachopoulos (Greek: Βλαχόπουλος), feminine: Vlachopoulou (Greek: Βλαχοπούλου) is a Greek surname. Notable people include:

- Alexakis Vlachopoulos (1780–1865), Greek military leader, brother of Konstantinos
- Angelos Vlachopoulos (born 1991), Greek water polo player
- Aristotelis Vlachopoulos (1866–1960), Greek Army general
- Konstantinos Vlachopoulos (1789–1868), Greek military leader, brother of Alexakis
- Nikolaos Vlachopoulos (1868–1957), Greek Army general
- Orestes Vlachopoulos (1921–1984), Greek industrialist
- Rena Vlachopoulou (1917–2004), Greek actress
- Vassilis Vlachopoulos (1883–1944), Greek Army general and politician, great-grandson of Alexakis Vlachopoulos
