= French military mission to Japan =

French military mission to Japan may refer to:

- French military mission to Japan (1867–1868), to found the Denshūtai corps of elite troops
- French military mission to Japan (1872–1880), to reorganize the Imperial Japanese Army
- French military mission to Japan (1884–1889), which influenced the Imperial Japanese Navy
- French military mission to Japan (1918–1919), to establish the Japanese air force
