= Dimitrios Gouvelis =

Greek revolutionary and politician

- Δημήτριος Γουβέλης
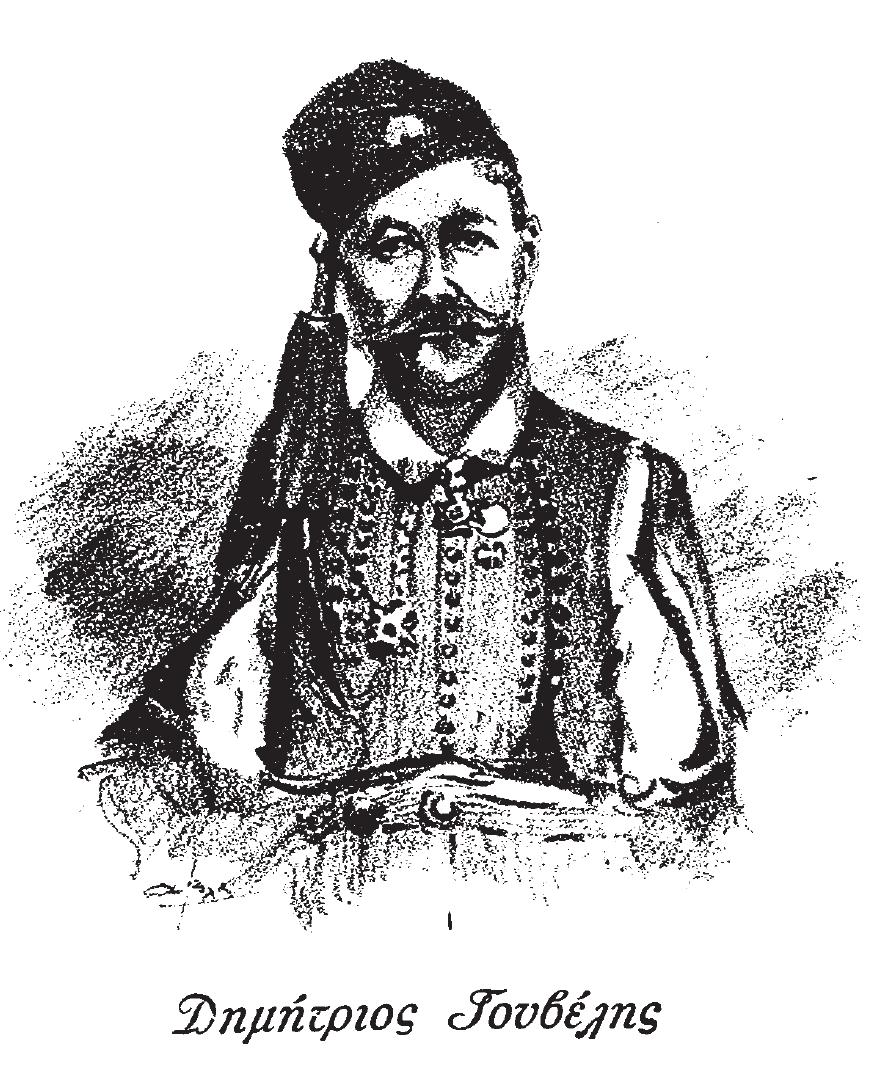
- An image of Dimitrios Gouvelis
- Relatives: Konstantinos Gouvelis (brother)
- Military career
- Allegiance: First Hellenic Republic; Kingdom of Greece
- Branch: Hellenic Army
- Conflicts: Greek War of Independence; Battle of Dervenakia; Battle of Karpenisi

Dimitrios Gouvelis (Greek: Δημήτριος Γουβέλης) was a military leader of the Greek War of Independence and politician.

Hailing from Karpenisi, Dimitrios Gouvelis was an armatolos during the final years of Ottoman rule in Greece. When the Greek War of Independence broke out, he formed his own armed band, and fought in the Siege of Karpenisi, the Battle of Dervenakia, and in the Battle of Agios Vlasios. In 1824, the provisional Greek government named him prefect of Karpenisi and garrison commander of Mount Apokleistra. In 1825 he was promoted to chiliarch. He was later promoted to general rank, and was elected to the national assemblies of 1832 and 1843. He was the brother of Konstantinos Gouvelis.
