= Sotiropoulos =

Sotiropoulos is a surname. Notable people with the surname include:

- Constantin Sotiropoulos, French computer programmer
- Ersi Sotiropoulou (born 1953), Greek writer
- Fotis Sotiropoulos (born 1963), Greek-born American engineering professor and university administrator
- George Sotiropoulos (born 1977), Australian mixed martial artist
- Sotirios Sotiropoulos (1831–1898), Greek economist and politician
- Spyridon Sotiropoulos (fl. 1879–1921), Greek general
