= Hatzipetros =

Hatzipetros is a surname. Notable people with the surname include:

- Christodoulos Hatzipetros, Greek military leader
- Christos Hatzipetros, Greek artillery officer
- Alexandros Hatzipetros, Greek soldier and politician
