= Ioannis Mamouris =

Greek soldier (1797–1867)

- Ιωάννης Μαμούρης
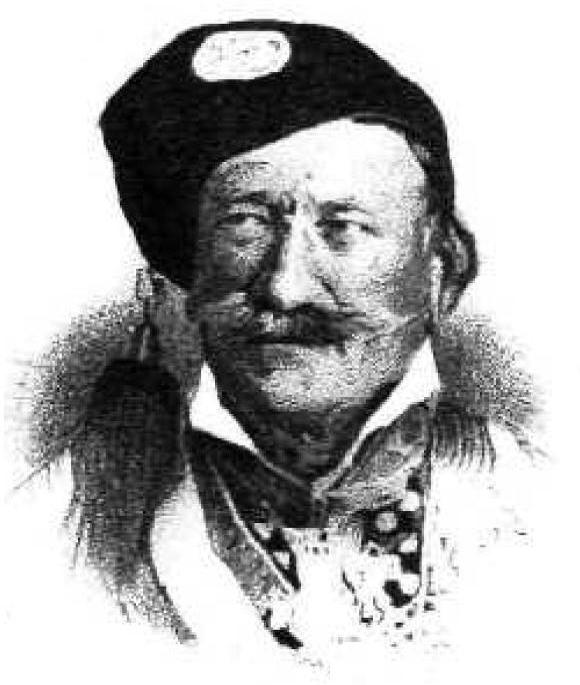
- A portrait of Mamouris c. 1868
- Born: c. 1797; Dremista, Sanjak of Eğriboz, Ottoman Empire (now Greece)
- Died: 12 April 1867; Athens, Kingdom of Greece
- Spouse: Daughter of Ioannis Vlachos
- Children: Iraklis Mamouris
- Relatives: Ioannis Gouras (cousin)
- Military career
- Allegiance: First Hellenic Republic; Kingdom of Greece
- Rank: Pentakosiarch (Revolutionary forces); Major General (Hellenic Army)
- Nicknames: Yiannis of Goura; Γιάννης του Γκούρα
- Known for: One of the killers of Odysseas Androutsos
- Conflicts: Greek War of Independence; Liberation of Salona; Battle of Gravia Inn; Battle of Vasilika; Greek Civil Wars; Second Siege of the Acropolis; Battle of Petra

Ioannis Mamouris (Greek: Ιωάννης Μαμούρης) (1797 – 1867), also known as Yiannis of Goura (Γιάννης του Γκούρα), was a Greek chieftain of the Greek War of Independence and officer of the Hellenic Army. He is considered as one of the killers of Odysseas Androutsos.

== Biography ==
=== Greek War of Independence ===
Mamouris joined the klephtes of Central Greece at an early age. After the beginning of the Greek Revolution he was initially under the command of Panourgias and he participated in the liberation of Salona. He took over the guarding of the Ottoman prisoners of war, who finally were executed almost to the man by his cousin, Ioannis Gouras, on the orders of Panourgias.

Under the command of Odysseas Androutsos he participated in the battles of Gravia and Vasilika. Later, he fought under the command of Gouras and became notorious for abuses at the expense of the residents of Athens. During the Greek civil wars of 1823–25, he fought on the side of the government forces while in 1824 he was appointed chiliarch.

On 5 June 1825, on Gouras' command, along with Mitros Triantafyllinas and Papakostas Tzamalas he murdered Odysseas Androutsos, who was held prisoner in the Acropolis of Athens, by strangling him in his cell. Then they threw the body off the Frankish Tower in an attempt to make it look as if he had died during an escape attempt.

At the end of 1825, he was one of the supporters of the creation of a regular army, but during the next year, he and other chieftains turned against it, fearing that with the generalization of the institution they would lose their influence. The same year, he participated in Charles Fabvier's campaign in Euboea and later he took part in the defence of the Acropolis during its siege by Reşid Mehmed Pasha. After the death of Gouras, he replaced him as commandant of the fortress. In 1828, he became second pentakosiarch in the 4th chiliarchy and was distinguished in 1829 for his participation in the Battle of Petra, the last battle of the Greek Revolution.

=== Later life ===
In late 1830 he joined the regular army, with the rank of Major. He became notorious for the harsh suppression of revolts against King Otto, and advanced to the rank of Major General. He died in Athens on 12 April 1867. He was married to the daughter of the Athenian notable Ioannis Vlachos. His son was Major General Iraklis Mamouris.
