= Chrysanthos Sisinis =

Chrysanthos Sisinis can refer to:

- Chrysanthos Sisinis (died 1845), Greek revolutionary fighter and politician
- Chrysanthos Sisinis (general), Greek general
