= Konstantinos Gouvelis (1780–1829) =

Ottoman politician

Konstantinos Gouvelis (Greek: Κωνσταντίνος Γουβέλης) was an Ottoman-era magnate and politician who took part in the Greek War of Independence.

Hailing from Karpenisi, Konstantinos Gouvelis was the brother of the armatolos Dimitrios Gouvelis. Highly educated and very wealthy, during the final years of Ottoman rule in Greece, Konstantinos Gouvelis served as principal secretary to Veli Pasha, son of the powerful Ali Pasha of Yanina, and entered the Filiki Etaireia.

When the Greek War of Independence broke out, Gouvelis moved to Missolonghi, donating his entire fortune to the war effort. He was elected as a representative to the Third National Assembly at Troezen, and died in 1829 at Nafplio.

He was the grandfather of the Greek general Konstantinos Gouvelis.
