= French military mission to Japan (1872–1880) =

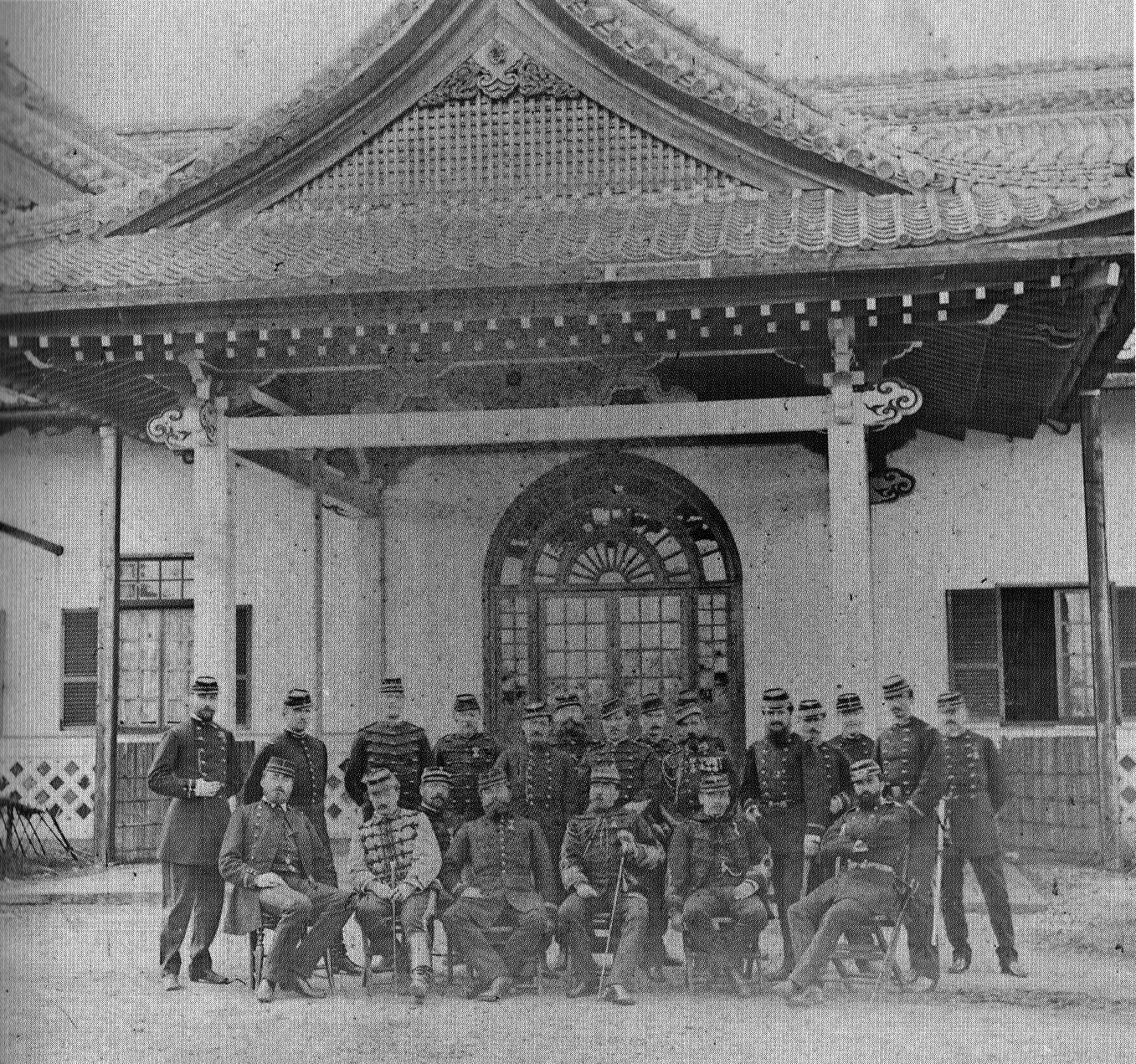
The second French Military Mission to Japan (1872–1880)

The 1872–1880 French military mission to Japan was the second French military mission to that country and the first sent by the Third Republic. It followed the first French military mission to Japan (1867–68), which had ended with the Boshin War and the establishment of the rule of Emperor Meiji.

== Background ==
The formation of a second military mission to Japan was rather a surprise, as the first French military mission had sided with the shōgun Tokugawa Yoshinobu against the ruling government of Emperor Meiji during the Boshin War. Furthermore, France had lost some of its military prestige, due to its defeat during the Franco-Prussian War.

Nevertheless, France still retained some attractiveness for Japan. This was expressed by the Japanese foreign minister Iwakura Tomomi during his visit (the Iwakura mission) to France in 1873:

The Minister for Foreign Affairs of the Mikado (Iwakura) said to our representative after our fatal combat against Germany: "We know about the sufferance France had to go through in this war, but it has not changed anything in our opinion on the merits of the French army, which showed great courage in the face of numerically superior troops"

— Revue des Deux Mondes (March–April 1873). Le Japon depuis l'Abolition du Taïcounat

== The mission ==
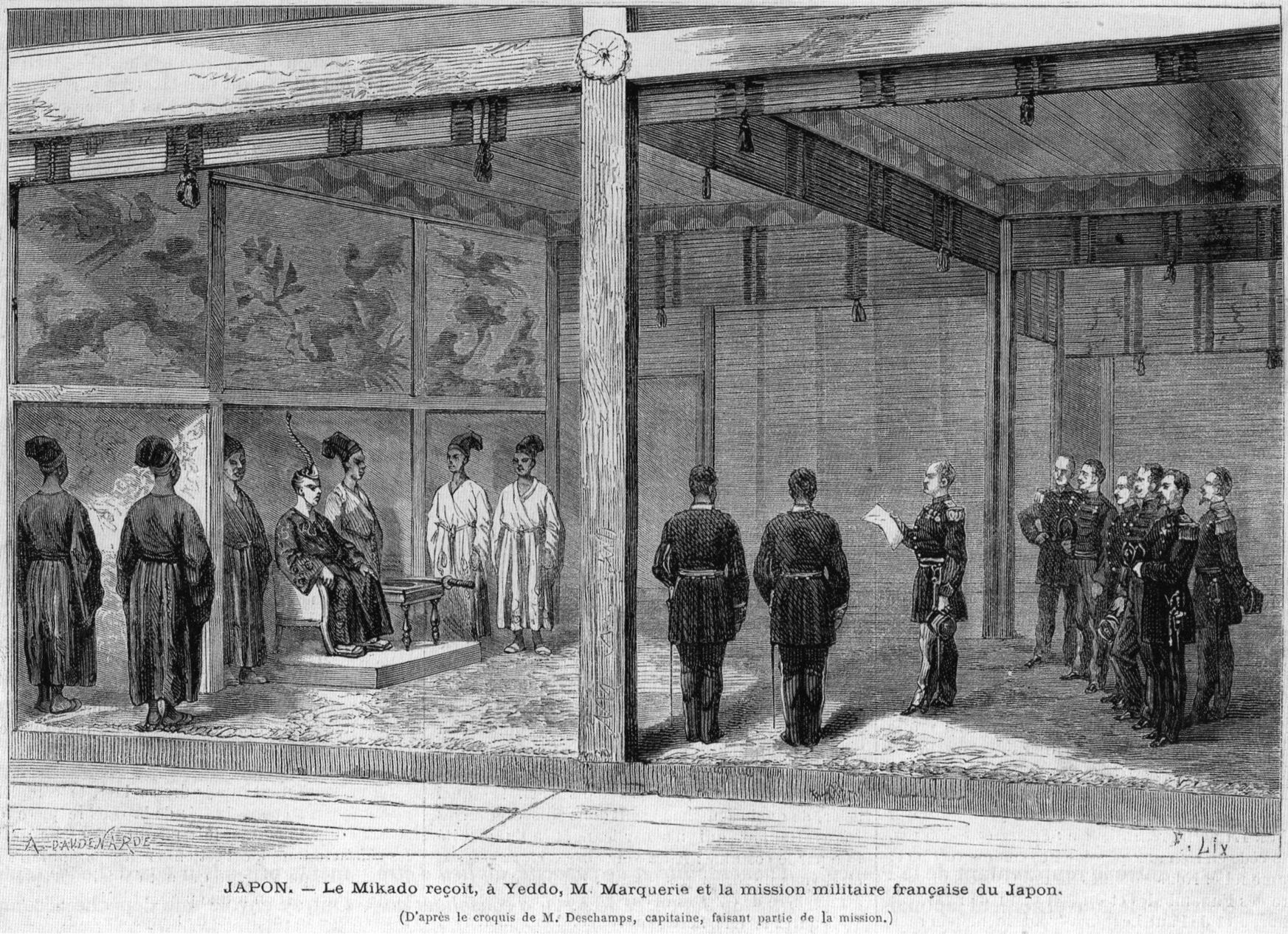
Reception by the Meiji Emperor of the Second French Military Mission to Japan, 1872

The mission arrived in Japan in May 1872, headed by Lieutenant Colonel Charles Antoine Marquerie (1824–1894). He was later replaced by Colonel Charles Claude Munier.

The mission was composed of nine officers, 14 non-commissioned officers, a music chief (Gustave Désiré Dragon), a veterinarian, and two craftsmen. A famous member of the mission was Louis Kreitmann (1851–1914), an army engineer and captain ("Capitaine du Génie"). Louis Kreitmann would later become director of the prestigious École Polytechnique. Kreitmann took about 500 photographs, which are now held at the Institut des Hautes Études Japonaises (Collège de France), Paris.

The members of the mission were hired with three-year contracts, with monthly salaries from 150 to 400 yen (for comparison, at the time the salary of the Japanese Prime Minister was 500 yen, and a newly graduated school teacher would receive 5 yen monthly).

== Activities ==
The task of the mission was to help reorganize the Imperial Japanese Army, and establish the first draft law, enacted in January 1873. This draft was originally described as a "blood tax" (血税, ketsuzei) which led to the blood tax riots by alarmed peasants. The law established military service for all males, for a duration of three years, with an additional four years in the reserve.

The French mission was essentially active at the Ueno Military School for non-commissioned officers. Between 1872 and 1880, various schools and military establishments were set up under the direction of the mission, including:

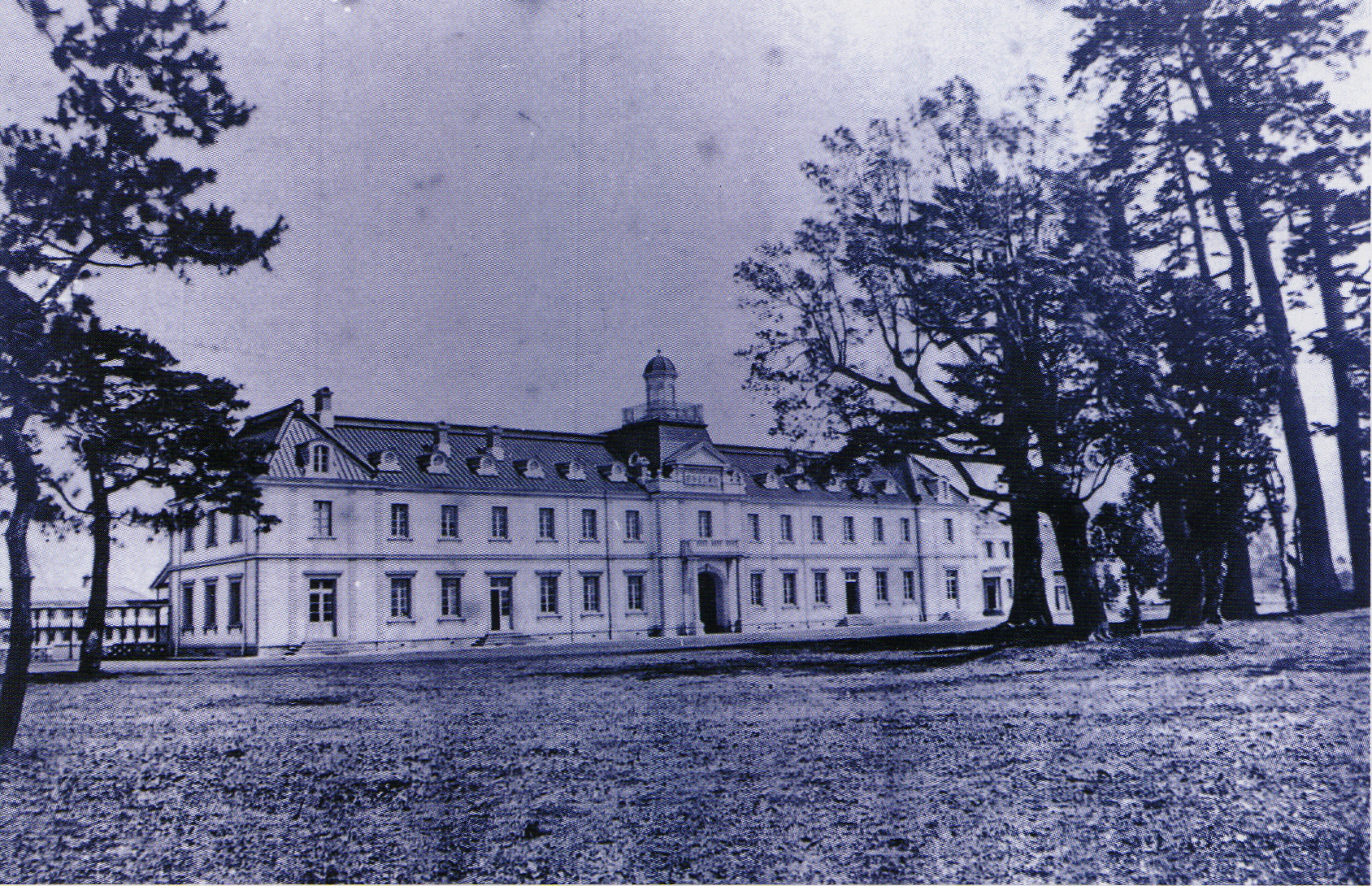
Imperial Japanese Army Academy (市ヶ谷陸軍士官学校) at Ichigaya, Tokyo. It was built by the second French Military Mission to Japan, on the ground of today's Japan Ministry of Defense (1874 photograph)

- Establishment of the Toyama Gakko, the first school to train and educate officers and noncommissioned officers.
- A shooting school, using French rifles.
- An arsenal for gun and munition manufacture, equipped with French machinery, which employed 2500 workers.
- Artillery batteries in the suburbs of Tokyo.
- A gunpowder factory.
- A Military Academy for Army officers in Ichigaya, inaugurated in 1875, on the ground of today's Ministry of Defense.

Between 1874 and the end of their term, the mission was in charge of building Japan's coastal defenses.

The mission occurred at the time of a tense internal situation in Japan, with the revolt of Saigō Takamori in the Satsuma rebellion, and contributed significantly to the modernization of Imperial forces before the conflict.

Some members of the mission also endeavoured to learn Japanese martial arts: Villaret and Kiehl were members of the dojo of Sakakibara Kenkichi, a master of Jikishinkage-ryu, a form of swordsmanship (Kenjutsu), making them some of the first western students of Japanese martial arts.

== Legacy ==
A third French military mission to Japan (1884–89) would take place with five men, but Japan also involved Germany for military advice from 1886 to 1889.

Around that time however, France gained considerable influence over the Imperial Japanese Navy, with the despatch of the engineer Louis-Émile Bertin, who directed the design and construction of Japan's first large-scale modern Navy from 1886.

== Some other members of the mission ==
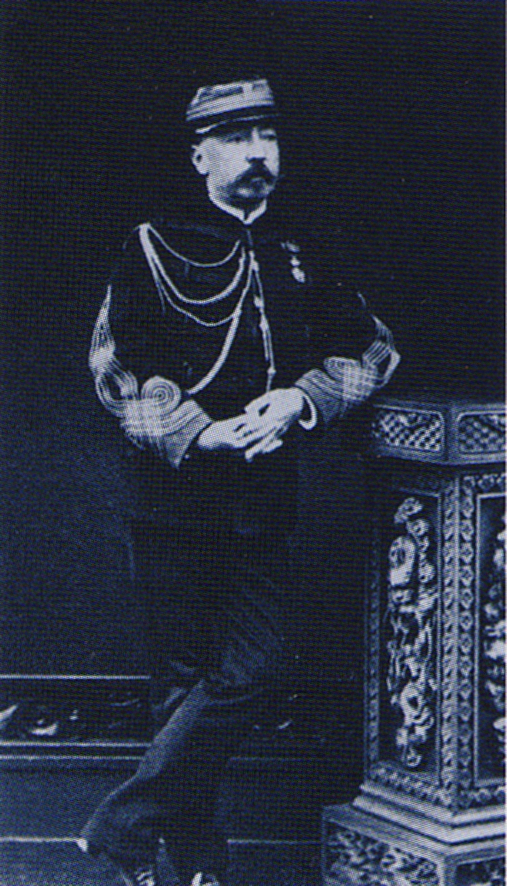
Colonel Munier, second commander of the Second French Military Mission to Japan. 1874 photograph.

- Armand Pierre André Echemann (April 11, 1872 – January 18, 1875). Infantry Captain (military exercises, shooting, physical training, and theory).
- Joseph Auguste Cros (April 11, 1872 – February 29, 1876) Infantry Sublieutenant (military exercises, shooting, physical training and theory).
- François Joseph Ducros (May 26, – April 10, 1877) Infantry Sergeant (instruction in physical training).
- Alexandre Étienne Bouguin (October 29, 1875 – December 31, 1879) Infantry Lieutenant (shooting theory).
- Joseph Kiehl (September 27, 1884 – July 24, 1887). Master-at-Arms and Marshal of the Logis (teacher of physical training and swordsmanship)
- Étienne de Villaret (October 29, 1884 – October 28, 1887). Lieutenant (strategy, shooting theory and technique).
- Henri Berthaut (hired on October 29, 1884) Lieutenant (Administration of the Mission, timetable of courses). Rehired on October 29, 1886.
- Henri Lefèbvre (September 25, 1887 – January 26, 1889) Infantry Captain (strategy, shooting, theory of physical exercise).
