= Ioannis Stratos =

Greek Armatolos and warrior

- Ιωάννης Στρατός
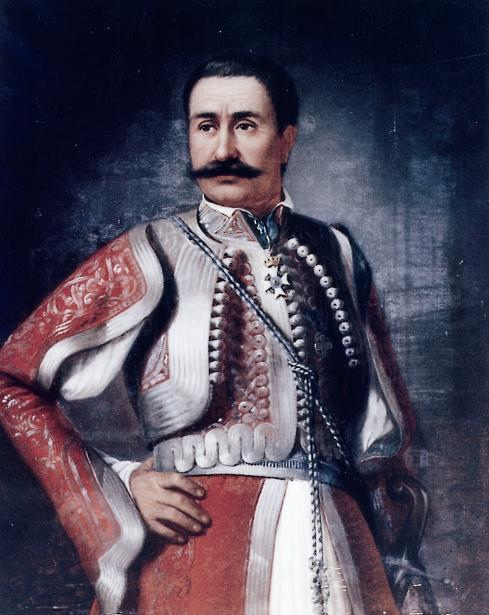
- Ioannis Stratos (National Historical Museum of Athens).
- Born: 1793; Loutro, Sanjak of Karli-Eli, Ottoman Empire (now Greece)
- Died: 1848 (aged 54–55); Kingdom of Greece
- Military career
- Allegiance: First Hellenic Republic; Kingdom of Greece
- Branch: Hellenic Army
- Service years: 1822–1848
- Rank: Chiliarch (revolutionary forces); Major General (Hellenic Army)
- Nicknames: Yiannakis; Γιαννάκης
- Unit: Royal Phalanx
- Conflicts: Greek War of Independence; Battle of Ternovo; Battle of Mavrilos; Battle of Petra
- Other work: Representative to the National Assembly

Ioannis 'Yiannakis' Stratos (Greek: Ιωάννης Στρατός; 1793–1848) was an Armatolos and warrior of the Greek War of Independence. After the establishment of the Greek state, he became an officer of the Royal Phalanx.

== Biographical information ==
Stratos was born in 1793 in Loutro, Aetolia-Acarnania and he belonged in an old armatolic family of Western Greece. At the beginning of the revolution, he followed along with his brother, Nikolaos, and his cousin, Sotirios, the famous armatole Gogos Bakolas and he was distinguished in the battles of Makrynoros in June 1821. In March 1822, he was in Makrynoros where he joined the forces of Gennaios Kolokotronis who had arrived from the Peloponnese. On September 13, 1825, he entered in the beleaguered Messolonghi. After the fall of Messolonghi, he went to Nafplio where he was appointed as a garrison commander of the castle Iç Kale (along with Athanasios Fotomaras) as an offset for the occupation of Palamidi from Theodoros Grivas, with whom he was in controversy despite the fact that they were cousins. In 1827 he was involved in an armed conflict with Grivas and the consequence was the cannon fire between the two fortresses and the lethal street fighting in Nafplio. The result of this conflict was the death or injuring of 50 people. Meanwhile, Stratos’ men captured several residents, including Anagnostis and Kanellos Deligiannis. These conflicts caused sad impression on foreigners who were during that time in Nafplio.

On July 21, 1827, Stratos handed the fortress to Velissarios Kalogeros and occupied areas outside the city of Nafplio, which were suggested to him by the government. Later, his men came into armed conflict with some villagers from Argos who had refused to give them food that was lined up for the troops. With the reform of the army during Kapodistrias’ governance, he was promoted to Chiliarch. As the head of the 3rd Chiliarchy, he took part in the campaign for the liberation of Central Greece and he was distinguished in the battles of Ternova, Mavrilos and Petra.

In 1832, he participated in one of the local governments that were created in Greece after the departure of Augustinos Kapodistrias. Over the next years, Stratos belonged to the so-called “French Party”. In 1843 he was elected as a representative to the National Assembly. He joined the Royal Phalanx and became a Major General. He was killed in 1848 when he was ambushed, during the chase of a group of thieves.

== Bibliography ==
- X. N. Filadelfefs ( ed.), Διάφορα έγγραφα και επιστολαί εκ της συλλογής του υποστρατήγου Γενναίου Κολοκοτρώνη, αφορώντα τας κατά το 1832 μετά τον θάνατον του Κυβερνήτου Ι. Καποδίστρια συμβάσας κατά την Ελλάδα ανωμαλίας και αναρχίας, Athens, 1855
- Dimitris Fotiadis, Ιστορία τού 21, Μέλισσα, Athens, 1971.
- Nikolaos Kassomoulis, Ενθυμήματα στρατιωτικά της επανάστασης των Ελλήνων 1821 – 1833, Πελακάνος, vol. 2, 2013.
- Dionysios Kokkinos, Η Ελληνική Επανάστασις, εκδόσεις Μέλισσα, 6th edition, vol. 2, Athens 1974.
- Stephanos P. Papageorgiou, Από το Γένος στο Έθνος, 1821–1862, εκδόσεις Παπαζήση, 2005 ISBN 960-02-1769-6.
- Apostolos E. Vakalopoulos, Ιστορία του Νέου Ελληνισμού, vol. 6 and 7, Thessaloniki 1982, 1986.
- Dimitrios Tsiamalos, Κοινωνική και επαναστατική συνείδηση των ενόπλων της Ρούμελης στην επανάσταση του 1821, Πάντειο Πανεπιστήμιο Κοινωνικών και Πολιτικών Επιστημών, PhD Thesis, Athens, 2007.
