= French military mission to Greece (1911–1914) =

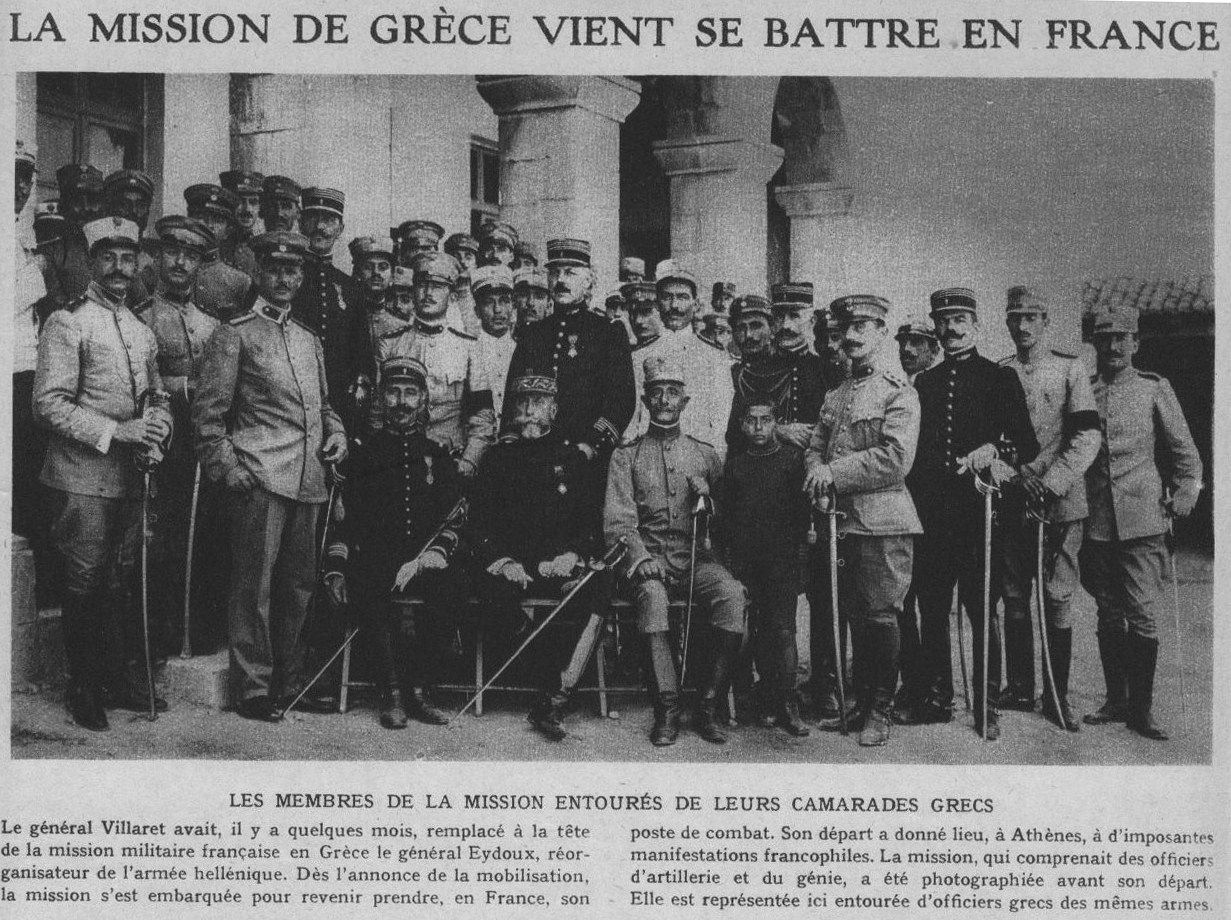
The French mission with Greek officers prior to its departure from Greece, July 1914

The 1911–1914 French military mission to Greece was called to Greece by the government of Eleftherios Venizelos to reorganize the Hellenic Army, parallel to a British naval mission for the Royal Hellenic Navy. The French mission arrived in January 1911, under the command of General Joseph-Paul Eydoux, replaced in April 1914 by General Étienne de Villaret (who had also served in a mission to Japan earlier in his career). Its reforms contributed to the Greek army's success during the Balkan Wars of 1912–1913. It remained in the country until it was repatriated shortly after the outbreak of World War I in August 1914.

== Background ==
Greece's defeat in the Greco-Turkish War of 1897 had highlighted the many deficiencies of the Greek military. Successive efforts to modernize and reorganize the Greek army were undertaken by the Georgios Theotokis cabinets in the 1900s, including provisions for the invitations of a foreign military mission to the country. Already in 1907, the Theotokis government approached the French with a proposal for a French naval mission, in exchange for French support for Greek efforts to secure an international loan. Despite the arrival of Admiral Ernest François Fournier with a team of officers, the mission's proposals to limit the Royal Hellenic Navy to light vessels, capable of acting only as an auxiliary to a Great Power, quickly aroused considerable opposition. Coupled with the hostile stance of Britain against a French encroachment of its traditionally dominant role in Greece, it heralded the mission's failure. In the next year, efforts were undertaken to secure German support instead. Germany proved willing to consider a Greek participation in the Triple Alliance, but the heightening of tensions in the Balkans after the Bosnian Crisis—particularly the Cretan issue for Greece—and the fall of the Theotokis cabinet in 1909 brought these discussions to an end. Instead, Germany focused even more on deepening its support in the Ottoman Empire.

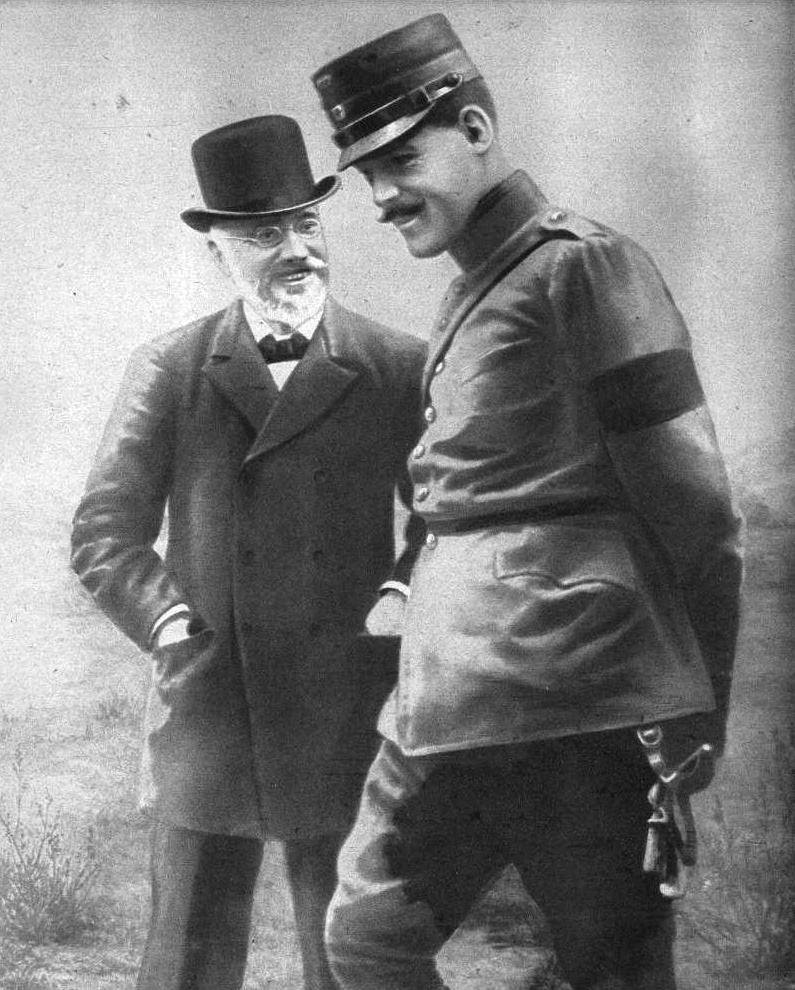
Prime Minister Eleftherios Venizelos (left) and King Constantine I (right) in 1913. The invitation of the French mission became one of the first incidents that led to the rift between the two and the National Schism.

Following the 1909 Goudi pronunciamiento and the rise of Eleftherios Venizelos to political dominance in Greece, the successive Greek governments paid much attention to re-arming and re-training the military, including extensive fortification and infrastructure works, purchase of new weapons, and recall of reserve classes for training. The climax of this effort was the invitation in 1911 of a British naval mission and a French military mission.

This decision caused the first dissension between Prime Minister Venizelos and King George I, who still favoured the invitation of German instructors, as did Crown Prince Constantine and a group of German-trained staff officers around him, such as Ioannis Metaxas. Venizelos justified his insistence on calling in the French saying that in view of the international situation he had "need of a 100,000-strong organized army the soonest possible", that the Germans were reluctant, and that furthermore political and financial considerations—chiefly the prospect of a new loan—forced Greece to look rather to the Entente Powers. Furthermore, the Greek Army had traditionally used French regulations, as well as French equipment, which would cause complications in the event that a German mission should be chosen. On the other hand, the same applied to the Royal Hellenic Navy, which was largely organized on the French model—in the 1880s, both the army and the navy had been reorganized by French missions. Political considerations, however, pushed Venizelos to prefer a British naval mission instead.

The decision to invite the French proved unpopular with the German-trained circle of staff officers around Crown Prince Constantine, whom Venizelos in a sign of reconciliation had restored to the position of inspector-general of the army (and thus most likely candidate for wartime commander-in-chief). This laid the first seeds for the emergence of a rival power centre around Constantine opposed to the pro-Entente policies of Venizelos, which would eventually lead to the disastrous National Schism.

== Arrival and work of the French mission ==
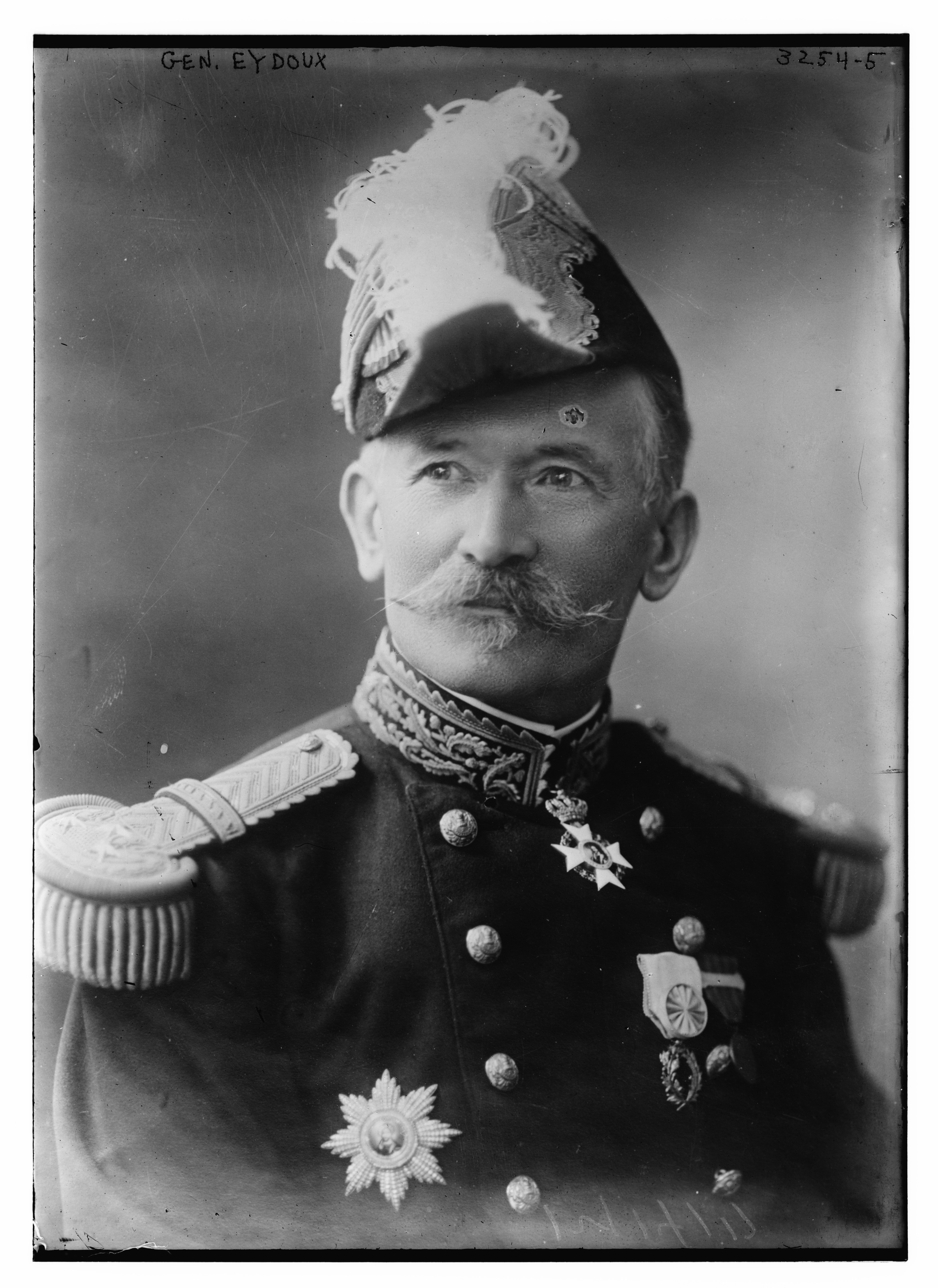
General Eydoux

On 21 January 1911, a joint Franco-Greek convention was signed on the subject of the French military mission, which was to comprise twenty officers. The mission was to be headed by Brigadier Joseph-Paul Eydoux, who had arrived in Athens on 17 January. According to the convention, and subsequent royal decrees implementing it, the French mission and its members were given extraordinary powers. Every French officer automatically received a rank higher than the one he had held in the French army, and was furthermore to be considered senior to all Greek officers of the same rank. Eydoux, now major general, aided by Major (now Lt. Colonel) Leon Jean Μarie Bousquier as his chief of staff, was named overall commander of all Greek military formations and institutions. The authority of the chief of the French mission extended over all aspects of military organization, procurements of arms and equipment, recruitment and training. In total, Eydoux's mission, apart from the general himself, comprised at various times from 14 to 18 officers.

Furthermore, individual French officers were granted Greek citizenship and placed in command of selected departments and units stationed around Athens. Lt. Colonel Bordeaux was appointed commander of the 1st Infantry Regiment, with the Majors Romieu and Savary as company commanders in the same unit (in June they would be promoted to battalion commanders). Colonel Génin was placed in command of the 3rd Infantry Regiment. Lt. Colonel Lepidi was placed in command of the 3rd Field Artillery Regiment, with Major Holtzapfell as a battery commander (battalion commander in June). Lt. Colonel Crosson Duplessis was placed in joint command of the 2nd and 3rd Engineers Battalions, with Major Pilla as a company commander (2nd Battalion commander in June). Lt. Colonel de Tournadre was placed in command of the 2nd Cavalry Regiment with Major Herbillon as company commander. Both were soon sent to organize the Greek Army's Riding School, but Herbillon returned in June as squadron commander in the regiment. Lt. Colonel Bonnier was placed in charge of the supply directorate.

The French mission began a program of daily training to improve discipline, teach the use of new equipment, and particularly train the senior officers in the handling of larger formations. Eydoux founded a preparatory course in École spéciale militaire de Saint-Cyr where future Greek officers were to be trained. While the French officers were generally credited with great energy and resolve to engage with chronic problems, however, frictions were not avoided: the French not only lacked any knowledge of Greek, which hampered communication, but were also occasionally accused of disdainful and even insubordinate behaviour towards their Greek colleagues, even superior officers.

Nevertheless, with the advice of the French mission, a new table of organization for the army was passed in January 1912 and implemented on 15 February. Its main feature saw the increase of the regular army to four infantry divisions, by adopting the triangular division scheme. At the same time, the French officers were shuffled to new positions at the head of directorates and departments: De Tournadre (now a colonel) was appointed commander of the newly formed Cavalry Brigade, while remaining commander of both the 2nd Cavalry Regiment and the Riding School. Soon he was also placed as head of the Cavalry Directorate. The Colonel of the Medical Corps Arnaud was placed in charge of the Medical Service, Colonel Lepidi in charge of the Artillery, and Lt. Colonel Bonnier of the Finance Corps. Lt. Colonel Savary was appointed commander of the 8th Infantry Regiment, and three months later of the 1st Regiment. His replacement at the 8th Regiment was Lt. Colonel Bordeaux, who on 1 July also assumed the role of inspector for the Army's infantry and Evzone units. Colonel Genin assumed the supervision of both the Army Officer Academy and the NCO School. Under French supervision the Army Officer Academy was modeled after the Saint-Cyr Academy shifting its focus from artillery and engineer training towards that of infantry and cavalry. With emphasis being given to field training and the duration of studies being reduced to 3 years.

== The spring manoeuvres of 1912 ==
The first test of the mission's results came in the great spring manoeuvres of 1912, which involved the 1st Infantry Division (under Emmanouil Manousogiannakis) at Larissa and the 2nd Infantry Division (under Panagiotis Danglis) at Athens. The opposing forces set out to meet each other, with the final phase of the manoeuvres taking place in the plain around Thebes. This was the first exercise of this kind ever conducted in Greece, and involved eight infantry regiments, three artillery regiments, two cavalry regiments, two engineer regiments, two mountain artillery squadrons, and one Evzone battalion.

Although considered a success, and helped raise somewhat the esteem in which other countries held the Greek Army's capabilities—a not inconsequential fact, given that the Greco-Bulgarian military alliance that signalled Greece's entry into the Balkan League was concluded ten days after the manoeuvres were completed—the manoeuvres shed light on some critical deficiencies in the army's leadership. While the Greek soldiers were considered good material, the army lacked sufficient NCOs and did not make good use of those it had, while the lack of proper military education and skills among the upper echelons of the hierarchy became glaringly apparent.

Crown Prince Constantine, in his capacity as inspector-general, held the final review of the manoeuvres at Tanagra, in the presence of the foreign military attaches. This resulted in a minor diplomatic crisis, as Constantine engaged in very harsh criticism of the army's state, essentially declaring it in a worse state than it was before 1909. Although he did not directly criticize the French mission, the implication was obvious, so that Eydoux threatened that he and his men would leave the country. Prime Minister Venizelos intervened and obliged the Crown Prince to redress the situation on the next day, during a formal dinner held in the palace: Constantine commended the French officers' work, and decorated them.

== Balkan Wars and aftermath ==
In large part due to the efforts of the French mission, in parallel with the strengthening of the navy, the Greek leadership became increasingly confident of its chances of success in a possible war against the Ottoman Empire. Until then, Greek staff officers like Metaxas, with the bitter experience of 1897 in mind, had advocated for a defensive stance deep inside Greek territory to force a stalemate, while the navy secured control of the Aegean. This would not only allow the navy to threaten the Ottoman rear with landing actions on Ottoman islands and shores, but would also entice the other Balkan countries into attacking the Ottomans. Eydoux, on the other hand, in accordance with the French Army's cult of the offensive, advocated an invasion of Ottoman territory. More importantly, the overhaul of the mobilization system by the French allowed Greece to field and equip a far greater number of troops than it had in 1897. While foreign observers estimated Greece would mobilize a force of approximately 50,000 men, during the Balkan Wars of 1912–1913, the Greek Army eventually fielded a force of 105,000, with another 140,000 in the National Guard and reserves.

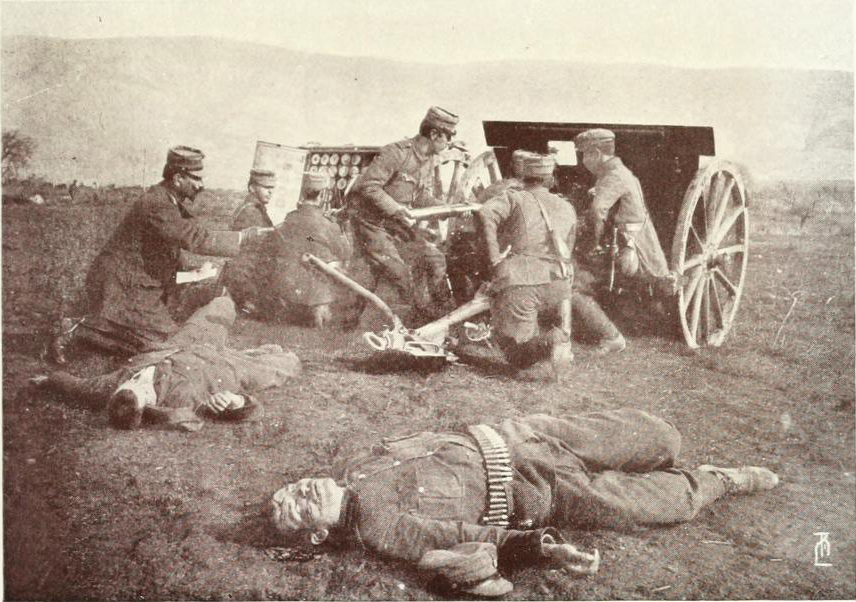
Greek artillery during the Balkan Wars

During the two Balkan Wars, some French officers were placed in field staffs, but most were assigned roles in the rear services, training reserves and organizing the commissariat. This was the particular purview of Colonel Bonnier. His efforts much improved the supply situation, but significant problems remained, giving the pro-German circles once again reasons to criticize the French mission's performance.

After the end of the conflict, on 17 October 1913 the members of the French mission were again reassigned. De Tournadre assumed command of the 2nd Regiment's rear depot, while remaining in charge of the Cavalry Directorate and the Riding School, with Lt. Colonel Herdillon as his deputy. Bonnier was replaced by the newly arrived Lt. Colonel Cazeres as head of the Finance Directorate, and the Lt. Colonel of the Medical Corps Coursergues was appointed as assistant to Colonel of the Medical Corps Arnaud. Holtzapfell, now a lieutenant colonel, assumed control over the rear depots of the artillery, while Major Thabard those of the Engineers. Bordeaux, now a colonel, assumed command of the depots of the 1st and 7th Regiments, in which Lt. Colonel Grabrel and Major Romieu assumed command of a battalion each.

The post-war organization of the Greek Army included the creation of new divisions and, for the first time, army corps. By royal decree on 29 November, Eydoux was placed in command of the I Army Corps at Athens, which was to be a model formation with special training purposes for the entire army, with the various army academies and schools subordinated to it. Colonel Bosquier was placed his as chief of staff and the newly arrived Lt. Colonel Bonifacy as Eydoux's aide-de-camp. Another new arrival, Major Cozares, took over I Corps' commissariat, and Lt. Colonel Couserques its medical services. Colonel Bordeaux took over command of the 2nd Infantry Division, and Lt. Colonel Grardel of the 1st Infantry Regiment, with Romieu as his deputy. Lt. Colonel Holtzapfell was appointed commander of the Field Artillery Regiment and of the various artillery training schools. Likewise, De Tournadre, while retaining all his previous duties, was placed in charge of the Cavalry Regiment, with Major Louville as his deputy. The newly arrived Major Thabard was put in charge of the Engineers School and the various attached training courses. On 7 January 1914, Colonel Descoins assumed command of the re-established Cavalry Brigade. Finally, in April 1914, Eydoux was replaced by Étienne de Villaret.

On 5 September 1914, following the outbreak of World War I, the French mission was recalled to serve in France.

== Sources ==
- Bordeaux, P.-E. (1930). "Trois missions françaises en Grèce: Fabvier, Vosseur, Eydoux". L'Acropole: Revue du monde hellénique (in French). V. Paris: J. Budry et cie: 47–78.
- Dimitracopoulos, Anastasios (1992). The First Balkan War Through the Pages of the Review L'Illustration. Athens: Hellenic Committee of Military History. ASIN B004UBUA4Q.
- Erickson, Edward J. (2003). Defeat in Detail: The Ottoman Army in the Balkans, 1912–1913. Westport, CT: Greenwood. ISBN 0-275-97888-5.
- Fotakis, Zisis (2005). Greek Naval Strategy and Policy, 1910–1919. London: Routledge. ISBN 978-0-415-35014-3.
- Katsikostas, Dimitrios (2014). "Η αναδιοργάνωση των ενόπλων δυνάμεων και το έργο της γαλλικής στρατιωτικής αποστολής Eydoux" (PDF). Hellenic Army History Directorate.
- Η ιστορία της οργάνωσης του Ελληνικού Στρατού, 1821–1954 [The history of the organization of the Hellenic Army, 1821–1954] (in Greek). Hellenic Army Historical Directorate. 2005. ISBN 960-7897-45-5.
- Vatikiotis, Panayiotis J. (2014) [1998]. Popular Autocracy in Greece, 1936-41: A Political Biography of General Ioannis Metaxas. London and New York: Routledge. ISBN 978-0-714-64869-9.
- Veremis, Thanos (1976). "The Officer Corps in Greece (1912–1936)". Byzantine and Modern Greek Studies. 2 (1). Routledge: 113–133. doi:10.1179/030701376790206162. ISSN 0307-0131.

== Additional reading ==
- Kitromilides, P. (2006). Eleftherios Venizelos: The Trials of Statesmanship. Edinburgh University Press. ISBN 0-7486-2478-3.
