= Loutro, Aetolia-Acarnania =

Loutro Λουτρό
- Community
- Location within Greece
- Coordinates: 38°56′42″N 21°10′44″E
- Country: Greece
- Administrative region: Western Greece
- Regional unit: Aetolia-Acarnania
- Municipality: Amfilochia
- Municipal unit: Amfilochia

Population (2021)
  - Community: 1,002
- Time zone: UTC+2 (EET)
  - Summer (DST): UTC+3 (EEST)

Loutro (Greek: Λουτρό) is a community in northern Aetolia-Acarnania, West Greece. It belongs to the municipality of Amfilochia. Its main village is Krikellos. Loutro is the birthplace of the fighter of the Greek War of Independence, Ioannis Stratos and Greek Prime Minister Nikolaos Stratos.

== See also ==
- List of settlements in Aetolia-Acarnania
