= Vasileios Vlachopoulos =

Greek general and politician

- Βασίλειος Βλαχόπουλος
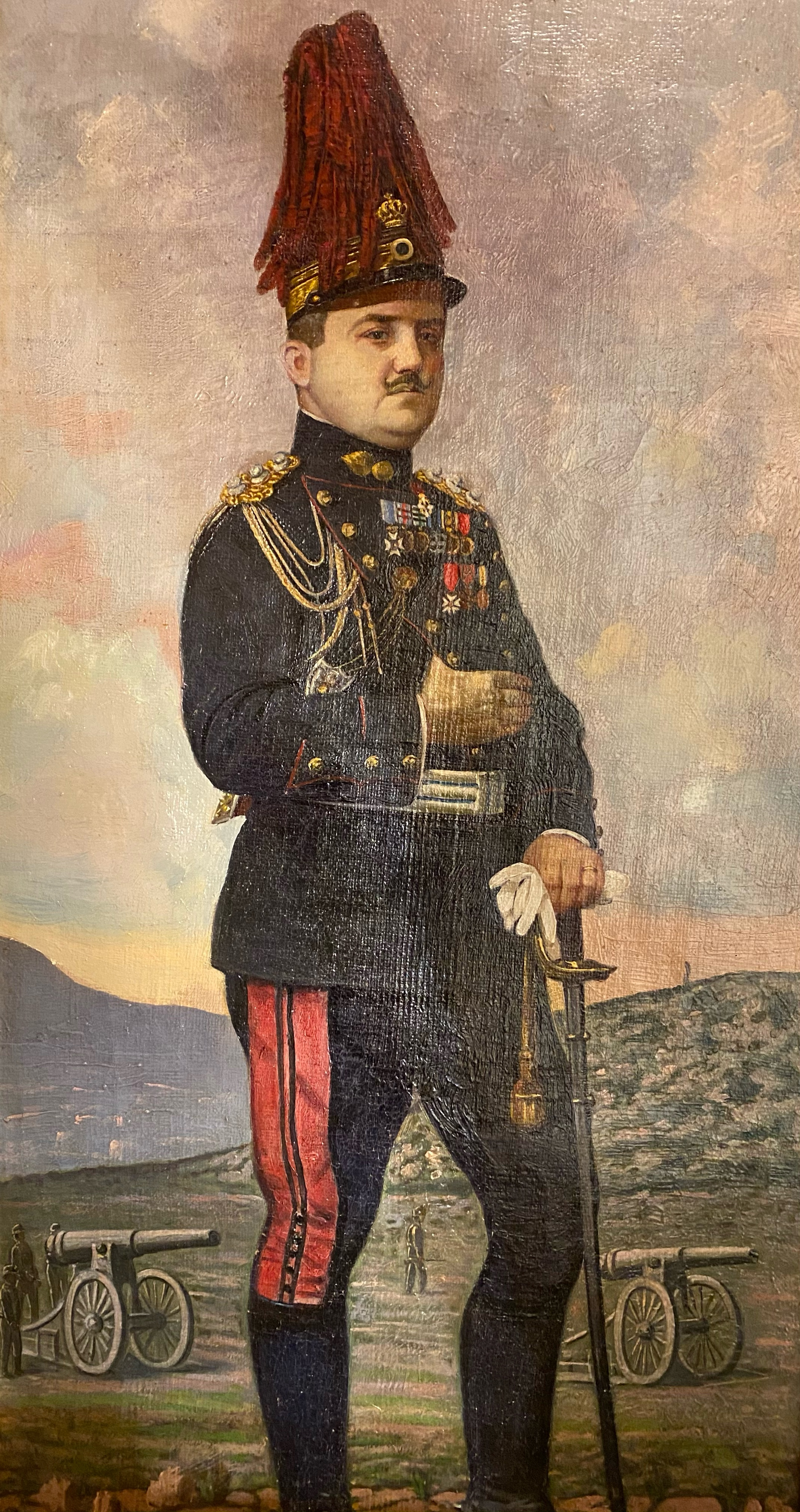
- A portrait of Vlachopoulos

Personal details
- Born: 18 December 1883 Agrinio, Kingdom of Greece
- Died: 28 December 1944 (aged 61) Athens, Kingdom of Greece
- Resting place: First Cemetery of Athens
- Party: Liberal Party
- Spouse: Thalia Sdralli
- Children: Orestis Vlachopoulos
- Education: Hellenic Army Academy
- Awards: Order of the Redeemer; War Cross; Medal of Military Merit; Order of George I Legion of Honour

Military service
- Allegiance: Kingdom of Greece; Second Hellenic Republic
- Battles/wars: Greco-Turkish War (1897); Balkan Wars; First Balkan War; Second Balkan War; World War I; Macedonian Front; Greco-Turkish War (1919–22)

Vasileios Vlachopoulos (Greek: Βασίλειος Βλαχόπουλος; Agrinio, 1883 – Athens, 1944) was a general, fighter in the First and Second Balkan Wars, World War I and the First and Second Greco-Turkish Wars, and a candidate member of parliament for the Liberals under Eleftherios Venizelos.

== Biography ==
Vlachopoulos was born in Agrinio in 1883. He enrolled in the Hellenic Army Academy and graduated. He served during the Balkan Wars of 1912–13.

On 8 April 1915 he was sent to Kragujevac, Serbia to determine the possibility of the Serbian government fulfilling its military obligations towards the Entente. Radomir Putnik, the Chief of Staff of the Supreme Command of the Serbian Army, refused to discuss the matter and on 10 August 1915, would inform Vlachopoulos that the transport of 150,000 Serbian combat troops to the Bulgarian border was not possible in the event that Bulgaria were to declare war.

He took part in the 1926 elections as a candidate for parliament for the constituency of Aetolia-Acarnania with the Liberal Party and received 622 votes.

In 1938, Vlachopoulos along with other descendants of leaders of the Greek War of Independence, founded the Patriotic Association of Descendants of the Fighters of 1821 in Athens at the King George Hotel.

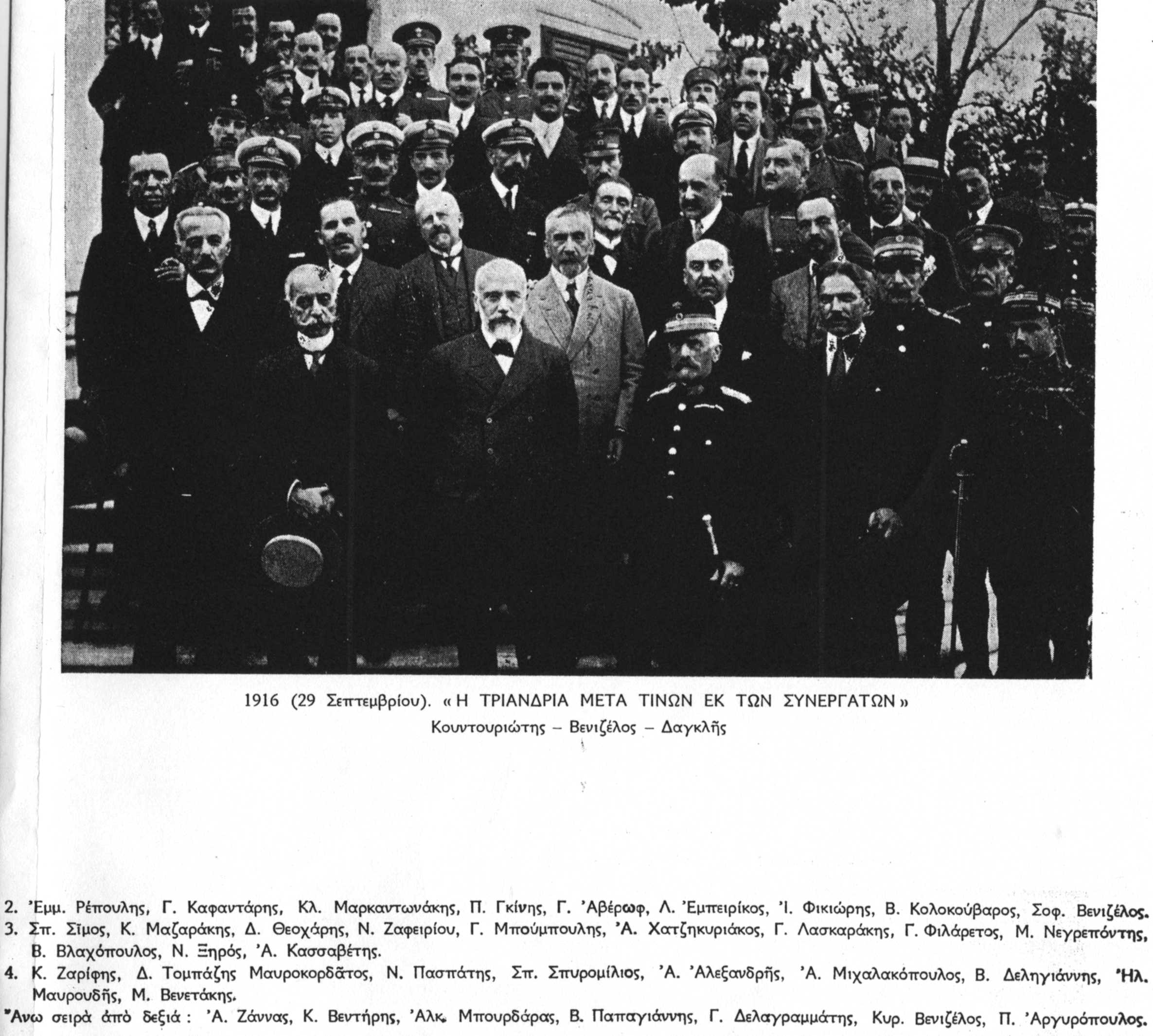
Vasileios Vlachopoulos photographed with other supporters of the Salonican Triumvirate. Pictured third to last in the third row.
