= Dimitrios Sisinis =

Greek Army general

- Δημήτριος Σισίνης
- Born: c. 1861; Gastouni, Kingdom of Greece
- Education: Hellenic Military Academy
- Relatives: Chrysanthos Sisinis (Brother)
- Military career
- Allegiance: Kingdom of Greece
- Branch: Hellenic Army
- Service years: 1884–1917; 1920–1921
- Rank: Major General
- Conflicts: Greco-Turkish War (1897); Balkan Wars: First Balkan War; Second Balkan War

Dimitrios Sisinis (Greek: Δημήτριος Σισίνης) was a Hellenic Army general.

Born in Gastouni in about 1861, he studied at the Hellenic Army Academy, graduating in 1884 as an Artillery Second Lieutenant. He fought in the Greco-Turkish War of 1897, and the Balkan Wars of 1912–13. In 1917 he was dismissed from the Army as a royalist during the National Schism, being re-instated in 1920 with the anti-Venizelist electoral victory. He finally retired from service on 12 October 1921 (O.S.) with the rank of Major General.
