= Napoleon Sotilis =

- Ναπολέων Σωτίλης
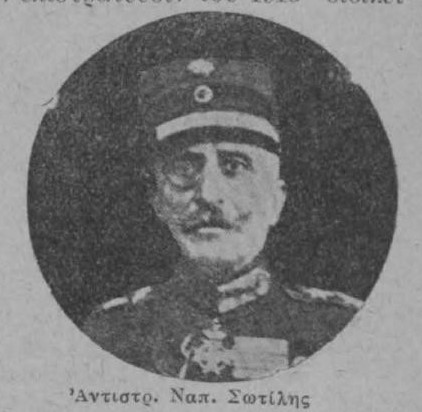
- Sotilis c. 1916
- Born: 1 November 1860; Nafplio, Kingdom of Greece
- Died: c. 1953; Kingdom of Greece
- Alma mater: Hellenic Army Academy
- Military career
- Allegiance: Kingdom of Greece
- Branch: Hellenic Army
- Service years: 1882–1917; 1920–1922
- Rank: Lieutenant General
- Commands: Deputy Chief of Hellenic Army General Staff; 7th Infantry Division; 8th Infantry Division; V Army Corps; II Army Corps; Superior Military Commander of Macedonia
- Conflicts: Greco-Turkish War (1897); Balkan Wars; First Balkan War; Second Balkan War
- Awards: Commander of the Order of the Redeemer

Napoleon Sotilis (Greek: Ναπολέων Σωτίλης) was a Hellenic Army officer who reached the rank of Lieutenant General.

== Life ==
He was born in Nafplio on 1 November 1860. He entered the Hellenic Army Academy, graduating as an Ensign of the Engineer Corps on 24 March 1881. He pursued further studies for four years in France, and fought in the Greco-Turkish War of 1897 with distinction, which earned him promotion to Major. He then served as a member of the international committee that supervised the evacuation of Thessaly by the Ottoman army.

In the next years, he served mainly in staff positions, and in the early phase of the First Balkan War held the post of Deputy Chief of the Hellenic Army General Staff, with responsibility for the rear areas. On 28 October 1912, he assumed command of the newly raised 7th Infantry Division guarding the demarcation line with the Bulgarian Army near Thessaloniki and the Pangaion Hills. Although allies in the war, Greece and Bulgaria were rivals over possession of Macedonia, and Sotilis forces were involved in clashes with the Bulgarians along the demarcation line. With the outbreak of the Second Balkan War between the former allies in June 1913, he led his division to victories against the Bulgarians at Sulovo, Nevrokop, Kremenska, Gorna Djumaya, and Predel - Han - Kapatnik. On 19 July he became commander of the temporary Nevrokop Army Detachment, comprising the 7th and 8th divisions.

After the Balkan Wars he continued in command of 7th Division at Kavala, and in 1915, with the mobilization of the Greek army, he assumed command of V Army Corps, and of II Army Corps in 1916. As a monarchist, he was dismissed from the Army in 1917–1920 during the National Schism. He was reinstated with the electoral defeat of Eleftherios Venizelos in November 1920 which brought the monarchist opposition to power, and assumed the post of Superior Military Commander of Macedonia.

He retired on 17 December 1922.

He died in 1953.
