= Ioannis Sismanis =

Greek Army general

- Native name: Ιωάννης Σισμάνης
- Born: c. 1859; Nafpaktia, Kingdom of Greece
- Allegiance: Kingdom of Greece
- Branch: Hellenic Army
- Service years: ?–1921
- Rank: Major General
- Conflicts: Greco-Turkish War (1897); Balkan Wars: First Balkan War; Second Balkan War; World War I: Macedonian front; Greco-Turkish War (1919-1922)

Ioannis Sismanis (Greek: Ιωάννης Σισμάνης) was a Hellenic Army general.

Born in Nafpaktia in about 1859, he became an NCO and was commissioned as an officer following graduation from the NCO School. He fought in the Greco-Turkish War of 1897, the Balkan Wars of 1912–13, the Macedonian front of World War I (1917–18) and in the Greco-Turkish War of 1919–22 until his retirement from service on 10 September 1921 (O.S.) with the rank of Major General.
