= Pentakosiarch =

Pentakosiarch (Greek: πεντακοσιάρχης, romanized: pentakosiarches; in Modern Greek usually πεντακοσίαρχος, pentakosiarchos), meaning "commander of 500". is a Greek military rank.

== Antiquity ==
It was first adopted in the infantry of the Army of Macedon (cf. Aelianus Tacticus and Plutarch, Life of Alexander, 76). The pentakosiarch commanded a pentakosiarchy (πεντακοσιαρχία, pentakosiarchia) of 512 men, composed of two syntagmata of 256. Two pentakosiarchies in turn formed a chiliarchy and were commanded by a chiliarch.

During the time of Alexander the Great, selection of the pentakosiarch was based on merit. An account, for instance, described a contest of valor at Sittakene for hypaspists where six pentakosiarch and three chiliarch were selected.

In the Roman army, the equivalent of pentakosiarch was the primicerius, who led 512 men.

== Modern Greece ==
The rank was revived for the irregular forces of the Greek rebels during the Greek War of Independence (1821–1829).

On 14 December 1868, a Royal Decree authorized the creation of thirty 'independent pentakosiarchies of volunteer light infantry' (αὐθύπαρκτοι πεντακοσιαρχίαι ἑλαφροῡ πεζικοῡ ἐξ ἐθελοντῶν) for the Greek Army, intended to serve as a militia. Numbered consecutively from 1 to 30, each was in turn composed of four hecatontarchies of 150 soldiers and 10 officers and NCOs each. With the pentakosiarchy commander and six other soldiers, including a flag-bearer, each pentakosiarchy numbered a total of 647 men.
