= Konstantinos Gouvelis =

Chief of the Hellenic Army General Staff in 1921

Konstantinos Gouvelis (Greek: Κωνσταντίνος Γουβέλης) was a Hellenic Army officer who rose to the rank of lieutenant general and served as Chief of the Hellenic Army General Staff in 1921.

== Life ==
Konstantinos Gouvelis was born at Karpenisi in 1868, to a family notable for providing several leading figures to the Greek War of Independence. His namesake grandfather, had donated his considerable fortune to the cause and was killed during the Fall of Missolonghi.

After excelling in studies in the Hellenic Army Academy, he was commissioned an artillery second lieutenant in 1888, followed by a two-year stay in Belgium for studies on weapons technology and manufacture. On his return to Greece, he served from 1892 to 1896 in the Amy's Geodetic Service. In the Greco-Turkish War of 1897, he served as platoon leader in the battles at Gritzovali, Mati, and Velestino. In 1902–1908 he was professor of fortifications, military technology and pyrotechnics at the Army Academy.

In 1909 he was one of the leading members of the Military League that led to the Goudi coup, and in 1911–1912 led the operations department of the Army Staff Service. During the Balkan Wars of 1912–13 he served as an artillery battalion commander in the 5th and 10th Infantry Divisions, distinguishing himself in the battles of Sorovich and Doiran. In 1915 he was appointed chief of staff to the Thessaloniki fortress area. As a result of the National Schism, in 1917 he was dismissed from the army, and reinstated only in November 1920 after the royalist parties came to power.

The new royalist government appointed him Chief of the Army Staff Service on 12 January 1921 in replacement of Aristotelis Vlachopoulos. Increasingly disagreeing with the management of the Asia Minor Campaign, he resigned on 2 April 1921, accusing the government of passivity and neglect.

He died on 16 October 1934.

Military offices
Preceded by Major General Aristotelis Vlachopoulos	Chief of the Hellenic Army General Staff; January–April 1921	Succeeded by Lt. General Viktor Dousmanis
