= Emmanuel Han =

Swiss military personnel (1801–1867)

Amadeus-Emmanuel Han (Greek: Εμμανουήλ Χαν, Emmanouil Han; 1801–1867) was a Swiss military officer and philhellene who fought in the Greek War of Independence and became a general in the Army of independent Greece.

== Biography ==
Born in Bern in 1801, Han served in the Swiss Army in 1818–23, before leaving to join the Greek rebels in the Greek War of Independence. In Greece, he enlisted in the Philhellenes Company in 1825, fighting in several battles (Tripoli, Oropos, Thebes, Chios, Çeşme, etc.). After the establishment of the independent Kingdom of Greece, he remained as an officer in the regular Greek Army, serving as aide de camp to King Otto of Greece and Inspector of Infantry, and rising to the rank of Lieutenant General. He played a leading role in the suppression of the anti-Otto Nafplio Rebellion of 1862, which presaged the end of Otto's rule.

He retired on 23 January 1865 and returned to Switzerland, where he died on 22 June 1867.
