= Ioannis Trilivas =

Hellenic Army officer

- Ιωάννης Τριλίβας
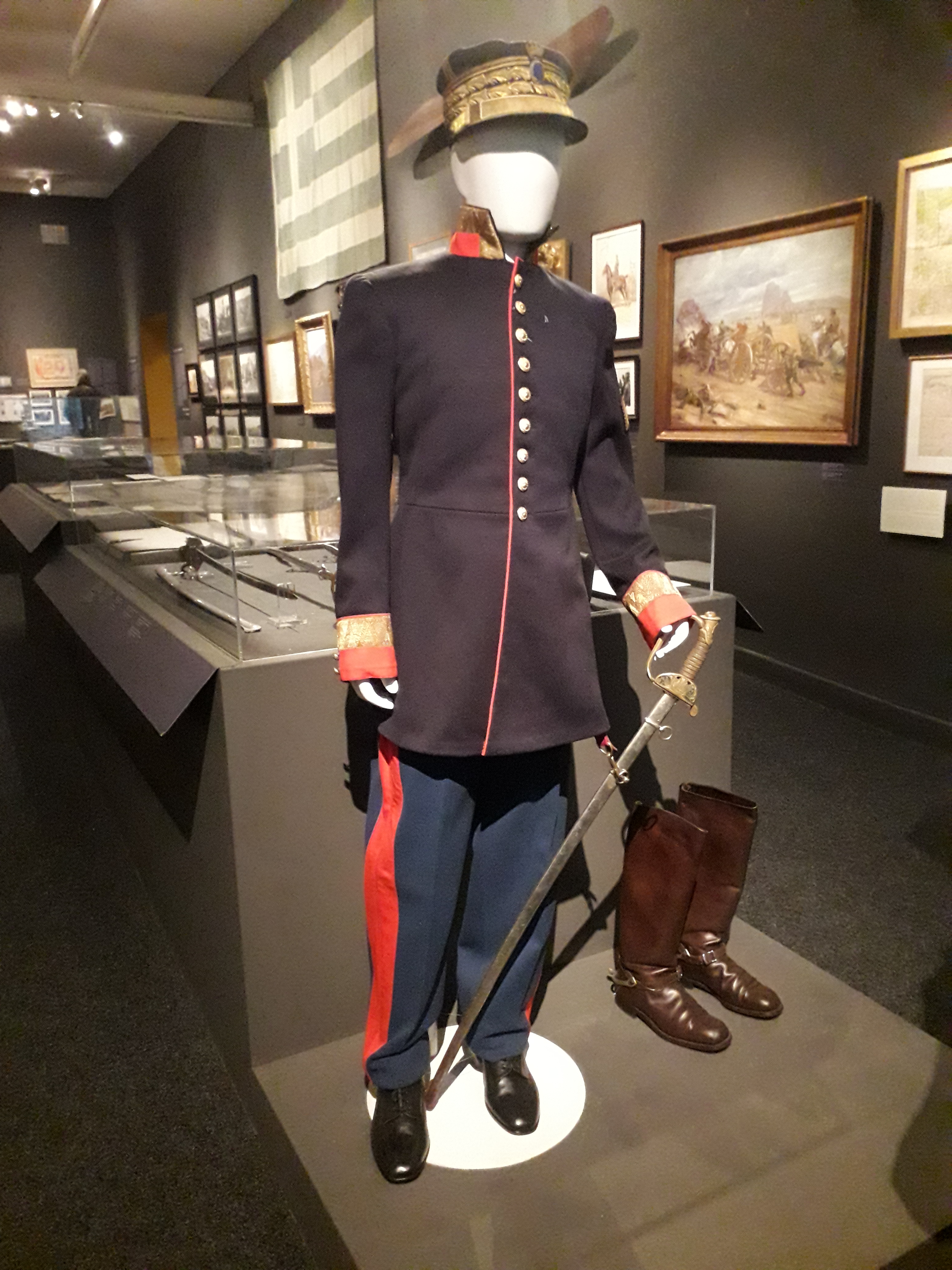
- Official uniform of Ioannis Trilivas from the time of his service in the Greco-Turkish War (1919–1922)
- Born: 1/12 January 1868; Ithaca, Kingdom of Greece
- Military career
- Allegiance: Kingdom of Greece; Second Hellenic Republic
- Branch: Hellenic Army
- Service years: 1885–1923; 1927–1928
- Rank: Lieutenant General
- Units: Hellenic Gendarmerie; Hellenic Military Geographical Service
- Commands: 5th Infantry Division; Head of Royal Gendarmerie; IV Army Corps
- Conflicts: Greco-Turkish War (1897); Balkan Wars; First Balkan War; Battle of Yenidje; Battle of Bizani; Second Balkan War; Battle of Kilkis–Lachanas; World War I; Macedonian Front; Battle of Doiran; Greco-Turkish War (1919-1922); Greek Summer Offensive; Battle of Kütahya–Eskişehir; Battle of the Sakarya

Ioannis Trilivas (Greek: Ιωάννης Τριλίβας) was a Hellenic Army officer who reached the rank of Lieutenant General, and fought in the Greco-Turkish War of 1897, the Balkan Wars, the Macedonian front of World War I, and in the Asia Minor Campaign that followed.

== Life ==
Ioannis Trilivas was born in Ithaca on 1 January 1868 (O.S.). He joined the Hellenic Army on 4 May 1885 (O.S.), and after studies at the NCO School was commissioned as an Infantry Second Lieutenant on 4 August 1893 (O.S.). He fought in the Greco-Turkish War of 1897, after which he was transferred for a while to the Hellenic Military Geographical Service, and spent two years in training attached to a French infantry regiment in France. He participated in the Balkan Wars of 1912–13 as a company and battalion commander of the 9th Infantry Regiment, fighting in the battles of Yenidje, Bizani, Kilkis, and Djumaya. By 1918 he was Infantry Chief of the Serres Division, with which he participated in the fighting on the Macedonian front, and especially the Battle of Doiran.

In May 1921 he was transferred to the command of the 5th Infantry Division on the Asia Minor front, participating in the Battle of Kütahya–Eskişehir and the subsequent Greek advance that stopped at the Battle of Sakarya. He remained in Asia Minor until June 1922, when he was transferred back to Greece on his own request, barely two months before the Turkish offensive and collapse of the Greek front there. The September 1922 Revolution appointed him as head of the Greek Gendarmerie, but he soon resigned the post, and was retired from the Army in December 1923.

He was recalled to active service in 1927, serving as chairman of the council convened to restore royalist officers expelled from the army in the 1922–24 period. He then served as commanding officer of the IV Army Corps and head of the Lieutenant Generals' Council until his final retirement on 2 January 1928.
