= Andreas Platis =

Greek Army officer

- Ανδρέας Πλατής
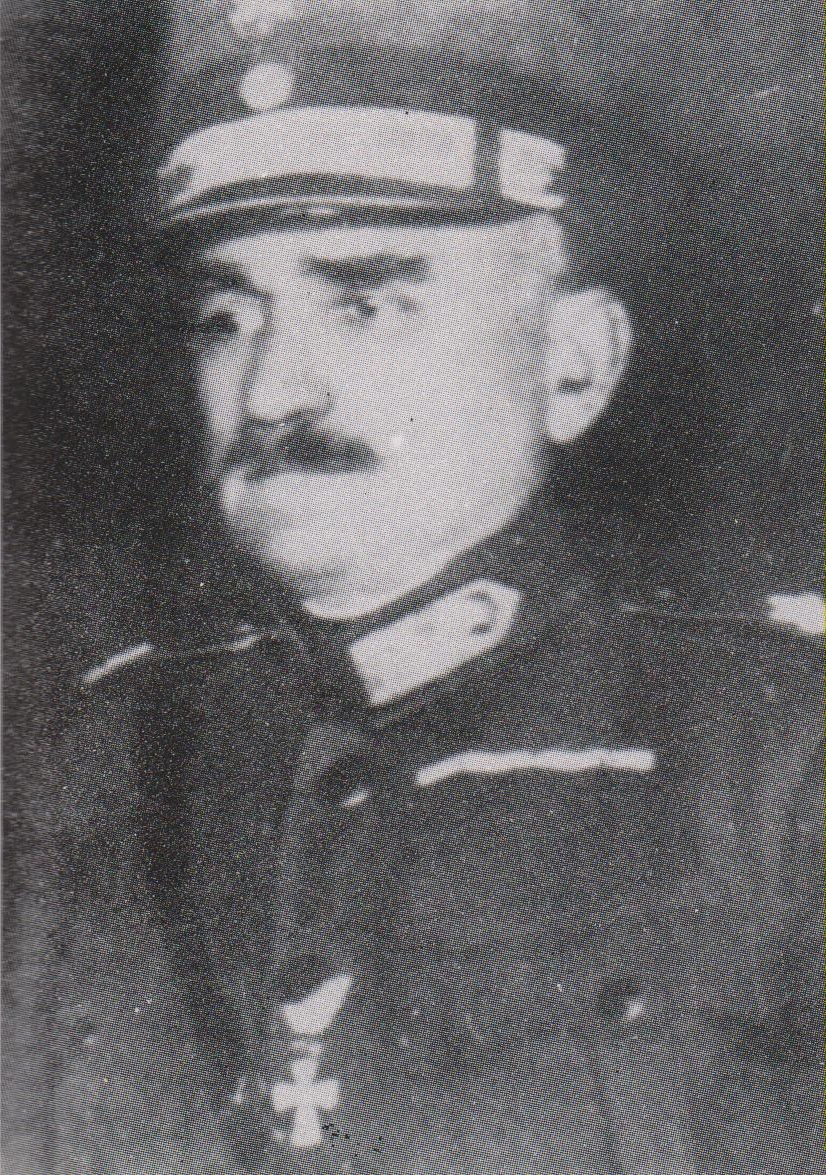
- Andreas Platis c. 1921
- Born: c. 1865; Athens, Kingdom of Greece
- Education: Hellenic Military Academy
- Military career
- Allegiance: Kingdom of Greece
- Branch: Hellenic Army
- Service years: 1888–1917; 1920–1923
- Rank: Lieutenant General
- Commands: 7th Infantry Division; III Army Corps; Smyrna Superior General Military Command
- Conflicts: Greco-Turkish War (1897); Balkan Wars: First Balkan War; Second Balkan War; Greco-Turkish War (1919-1922): Greek Summer Offensive; Battle of Afyonkarahisar–Eskişehir; Battle of the Sakarya; Greek Retreat; Battle of Dumlupınar
- Awards: Gold Cross of Valour

Andreas Platis (Greek: Ανδρέας Πλατής) was a Hellenic Army officer who reached the rank of Lieutenant General.

== Biography ==
Born in Athens on about 1865, he enrolled in the Hellenic Military Academy and graduated on 11 August 1888 as an Infantry 2nd Lieutenant. He fought in the Greco-Turkish War of 1897 and was a battalion commander of the 17th Infantry Regiment in the Balkan Wars. A moderate monarchist, he was dismissed from the army by the Venizelists in 1917–1920, but was recommissioned following the Venzelist electoral defeat in November 1920. In 1921 he assumed command of the 7th Infantry Division, which he led in the Greek summer offensive and the advance towards the Sakarya River. In June 1922 he was named CO of the Smyrna Superior General Military Command, covering the Army of Asia Minor's rear areas. Following the Turkish offensive in August and the collapse of the Greek army, he assumed for a short time command of the Greek troops in the Erythraean peninsula, before they were evacuated to Greece. Following the September 1922 Revolution, he went into retirement along with several other pro-monarchist officers in November 1923.

== Sources ==
- Μεγάλη Στρατιωτική και Ναυτική Εγκυκλοπαιδεία. Τόμος Ε′: Νάβα – Σαρακηνοί [Great Military and Naval Encyclopedia. Volume V] (in Greek). Athens. 1930. p. 348.
