= French military mission to Japan (1884–1889) =

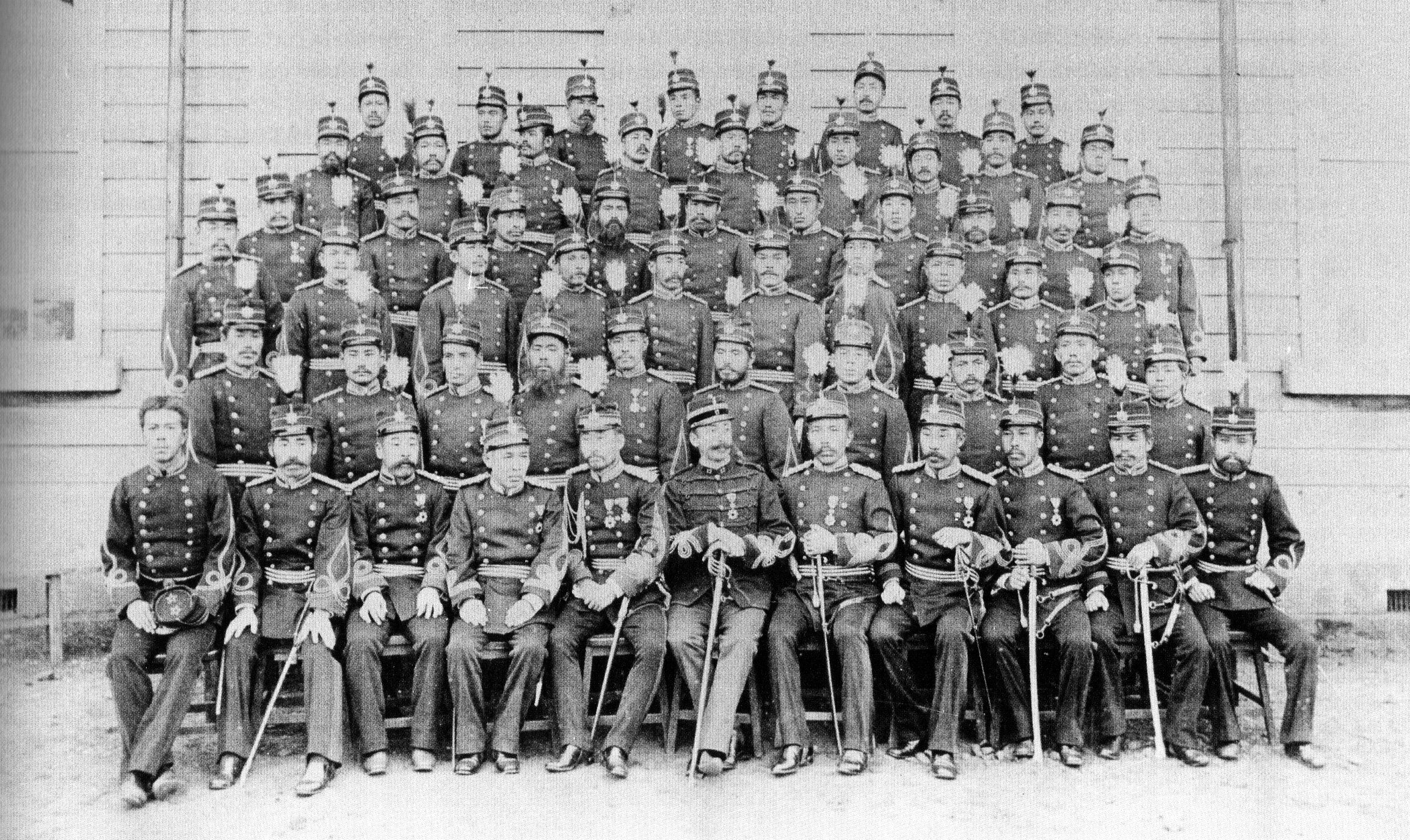
Captain Étienne de Villaret (front row, center), of the Third French Military Mission to Japan, with his officer students of the Ichigaya Military Academy

The 1884 French Military Mission to Japan was the third French military mission to that country and consisted of five men.

It followed two earlier missions, the first French military mission to Japan (1867–1868), and the second French military mission to Japan (1872–1880), which had a considerable role in shaping the new Imperial Japanese Army.

From 1886 to 1889, Japan also invited two German officers (particularly Jakob Meckel) in parallel to the French mission, who were influential in the Army General Staff reform.

France would gain considerable influence with the Imperial Japanese Navy instead, with the dispatch of the engineer Louis-Émile Bertin.
