= Étienne de Villaret =

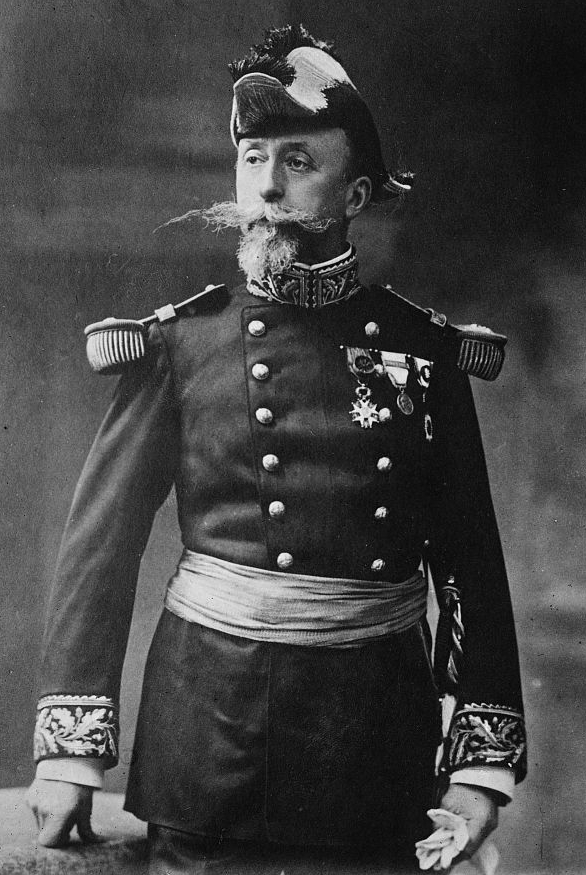

Étienne de Villaret (20:00,February 17, 1854 – 19:49,January 18, 1931) was a senior officer in the French army.

== Biography ==
He was born on February 17, 1854, in Saint-Laurent-Lolmie, France. In his youth, he served in Algeria and Tunisia, until 1884 when he joined the French military mission to Japan (1884–89) as a captain. Here he received the Order of the Rising Sun. After his return to France in 1887, he was promoted to Brigadier General in March 1912 and given command of the 79th Infantry Brigade.

In April 1914, he became head of the French military mission to Greece (1911–14) and commander of the Greek First Army Corps. He received the Order of the Redeemer but at the outbreak of the First World War, he was urgently called back to France.

He received command of the 14th Infantry division and fought in the Battle of Mulhouse in mid-August 1914. His division was transferred to the Somme where he participated in the Battle of Proyart-Vauvillers, First Battle of the Marne and the First Battle of the Aisne. For his excellent performance, he was promoted to command the VII Army Corps. On 13 March 1915, together with General Michel-Joseph Maunoury, he was seriously injured by a German sniper, but less than a month later, he retook command of his Army Corps, with which he fought in the Second Battle of Champagne.

In November 1915, he received command of the Seventh Army which he led in the last stages of the Battle of Hartmannswillerkopf. He remained in command of the Seventh Army until 19 December 1916, when he retired from active service.

He died on January 18, 1931, in Angiers, France.
