= Christos Hatzipetros =

Greek artillery officer

Major General Christos Hatzipetros
- Χρήστος Χατζηπέτρος
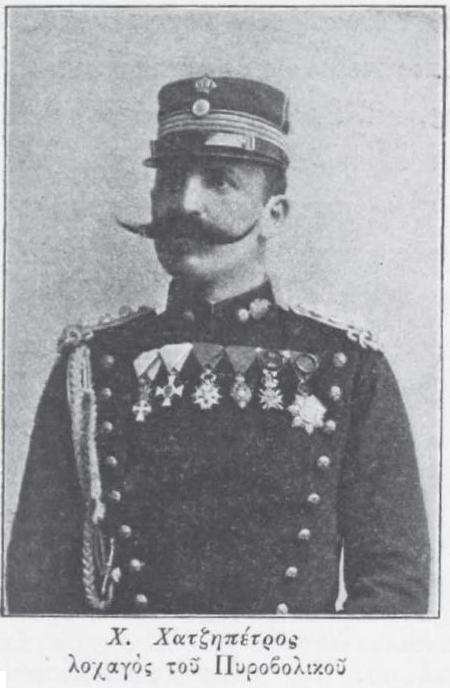
- Ch. Hatzipetros as a captain c. 1900s.
- Born: 15 October 1873; Athens, Kingdom of Greece
- Died: 1945 (aged 71–72); Athens, Kingdom of Greece
- Education: Hellenic Army Academy
- Military career
- Allegiance: Kingdom of Greece; Second Hellenic Republic
- Branch: Hellenic Army
- Service years: 1895–1930
- Rank: Major General
- Units: IV Mountain Artillery Battery; 2nd Infantry Division
- Commands: Army of Asia Minor (commander of Heavy Artillery Regiment); II Army Corps (Chief of Artillery)
- Wars: Greco-Turkish War (1897); Balkan Wars; First Balkan War; Second Balkan War; World War I; Macedonian front; Greco-Turkish War (1919-1922); Greek Summer Offensive; Battle of the Sakarya
- Awards: Order of the Redeemer; Legion of Honour

Christos Hatzipetros (Greek: Χρήστος Χατζηπέτρος, 1873–1945) was a Greek artillery officer who rose to the rank of Major General.

He was born on 15 October 1873 (O.S.) in Athens. After studies at the Hellenic Army Academy, he was commissioned as an Artillery 2nd Lieutenant on 30 July 1895 (O.S.). He fought in the Greco-Turkish War (1897) as a section leader in the IV Mountain Artillery Battery. In the Balkan Wars of 1912–13 he commanded a field battery in the 2nd Infantry Division.

He fought in the Macedonian front of World War I and in the Asia Minor Campaign at the head of artillery commands; in the 1921 Greek Summer Offensive and the Battle of Sakarya he commanded the Heavy Artillery Regiment of the Army of Asia Minor, while in the 1922 operations he was Chief of Artillery for II Army Corps. In the post-war era he served as head of the Artillery Directorate in the Ministry of Military Affairs, and finally as Director-General of the latter, until his retirement from service with the rank of Major General on 5 July 1930.

He died in Athens in 1945.
