= Alexakis Vlachopoulos =

Greek armatolos, congressman, and politician

- Αλεξάκης Βλαχόπουλος
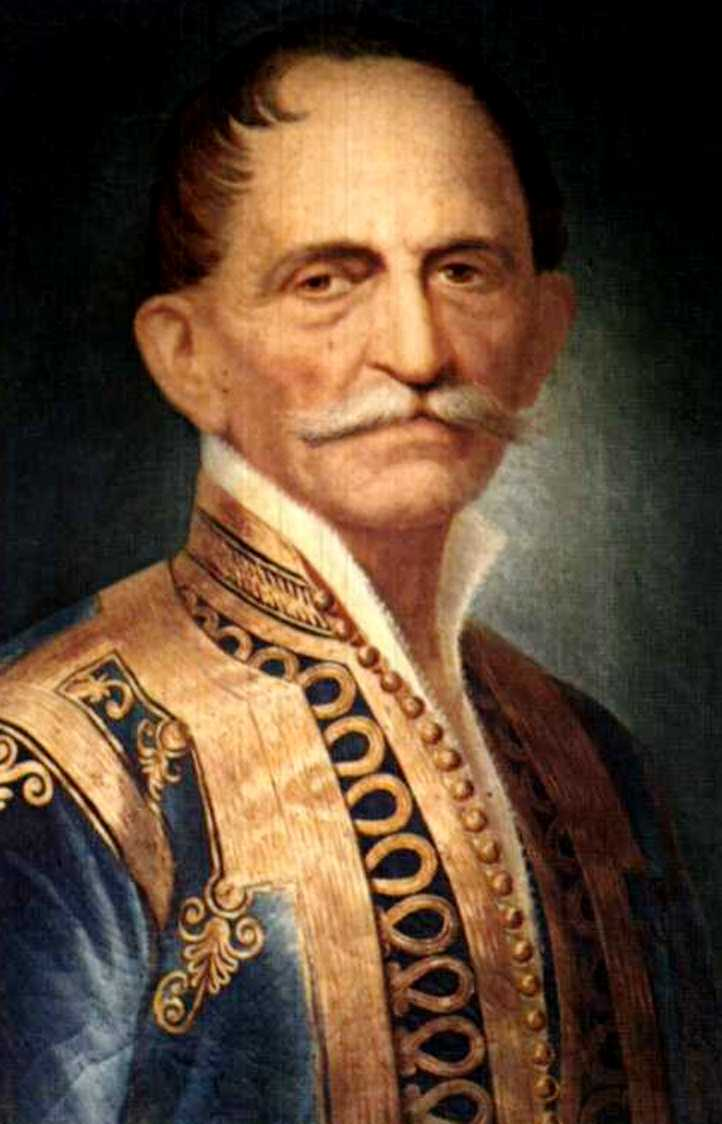

Minister of Defense
- Monarch: Otto
- Governor: Ioannis Kapodistrias

Personal details
- Born: Alexios Vlachopoulos; Αλεξιος Βλαχόπουλος c. 1780 Nicopolis, Eyalet of Yanina, Ottoman Empire (now Greece)
- Died: 1865 (aged 84–85) Athens, Kingdom of Greece
- Spouse: Anastasia
- Children: Euphrosyne; Kassandra; Parnassos
- Occupation: Adjutant to King George I

Military service
- Allegiance: United Kingdom; First Hellenic Republic; Kingdom of Greece
- Branch/service: British Army; Hellenic Army
- Unit: 1st Regiment Greek Light Infantry
- Battles/wars: Napoleonic Wars; Adriatic Campaign; Siege of Santa Maura; Greek War of Independence; 3 September 1843 Revolution

Alexakis Vlachopoulos (Greek: Αλεξάκης Βλαχόπουλος), also known as Alexis Vlachopoulos, (Nicopolis near Preveza, c. 1780 – Athens, 1865) was an armatolos, fighter in the Greek Revolution for Independence of 1821, congressman, and Minister of Defense. He was additionally a member of the Filiki Eteria.

== Biography ==
He was born in Nicopolis near Preveza, northwestern Greece, in 1780. Many members of his family were Armatoloi, Christian Greek irregular soldiers, in the area of Karpenisi, in central Greece. When he was young he went to Ali Pasha’s court, where he learnt to use the guns, like many other Greek fighters, as for example Odysseas Androutsos, Markos Botsaris, and others.

During the pre-revolutionary period he fought together with his brother Konstantinos, also an armatolos. Later, because of Ali Pasha's persecution, he and his brother were forced to flee to Corfu, where, the two brothers joined the Greek battalions of the British Army. In 1819 he was initiated, along with his brothers, Konstantinos and Dimitrios, into the Filiki Eteria (Society of Friends), a secret organization whose purpose was to overthrow the Ottoman rule of Greece and establish an independent Greek state.

He fought in many battles of the Greek Revolution of 1821, and while leading his army group he liberated the town of Agrinio, then called Vrachori. In this battle he took some Turks as hostages, which he later exchanged with members of his family which were imprisoned by the Turks in Preveza.

After the Greek Independence he became a politician. He served as a Minister of Defense in the government of Ioannis Kapodistrias, and also under the first king of Greece, Otto. During the 3 September Revolution of 1843 he was imprisoned. He served as an adjutant to king George I of Hellenes.

He was married to a woman named Anastasia, with whom he had at least three children. Two girls, Euphrosyne and Kassandra, and a son named Parnassos. Cassandra married Nikolaos Miaoulis, Andreas's grandson, while Euphrosyne married Panagi Valsamakis from Kefalonia. The daughter of Euphrosyne, Maria, married the Corfiot painter Aimilios Prosalentis, son of Spyridon Prosalentis.

He died in Athens in 1865.

== Bibliography ==
- Encyclopedia Eleftheroudakis (in Greek), Athens, 1960.
- Megali Elliniki Encyclopedia (Great Greek Encyclopedia) (in Greek), Athens, 1932.
- Papyros-Larousse Britanicca (in Greek), Athens, 2007.
- Dionysios Kokkinos, He Elleniki Epanastasis (The Greek Revolution) (in Greek), 6th Ed., Melissa Eds., Athens, 1974.
- Ioannis D. Akrivis, Alexakis Vlachopoulos or Sykas. The chieftain. (Nicopolis 1778 or 1780 - Athens 1865), (in Greek), Prevezanika Chronika 57-58, Preveza, 2021, pp. 199-208
