= Spyridon Sotiropoulos =

Greek general

- Native name: Σπυρίδων Σωτηρόπουλος
- Born: c. 1859; Patras, Kingdom of Greece
- Allegiance: Kingdom of Greece
- Branch: Hellenic Army
- Service years: 1879–1921
- Rank: Major General
- Conflicts: Greco-Turkish War (1897); Balkan Wars: First Balkan War; Second Balkan War

Spyridon Sotiropoulos (Greek: Σπυρίδων Σωτηρόπουλος) was a Hellenic Army general.

He was born in Patras in about 1859, and enlisted in the infantry as a volunteer on 21 March 1879 (O.S.). He served in the Greco-Turkish War of 1897 and the Balkan Wars of 1912–13, advancing through the ranks. As a monarchist, he was dismissed from the Army in 1917–1920 during the National Schism. He was reinstated with the electoral victory of the monarchist opposition in November 1920, before retiring on 6 October 1921 (O.S.) with the rank of Major General.
