= Chrysanthos Sisinis (general) =

Greek Army general

- Χρύσανθος Σισίνης
- Born: c. 1857; Gastouni, Kingdom of Greece
- Education: Hellenic Army Academy
- Relatives: Dimitrios Sisinis (brother)
- Military career
- Allegiance: Kingdom of Greece
- Branch: Hellenic Army
- Service years: ?–1915
- Rank: Major General
- Conflicts: Greco-Turkish War (1897); Balkan Wars: First Balkan War; Second Balkan War

Chrysanthos Sisinis (Greek: Χρύσανθος Σισίνης) (c. 1857, Gastouni – ?) was a Greek Army general.

He studied at the Hellenic Army Academy, graduating in 1881 as an Engineers second lieutenant. He fought in the Greco-Turkish War of 1897, and the Balkan Wars of 1912–13. He finally retired from service on 24 January 1915 (O.S.) with the rank of major general.
