= Aristotelis Vlachopoulos =

- Αριστοτέλης Βλαχόπουλος
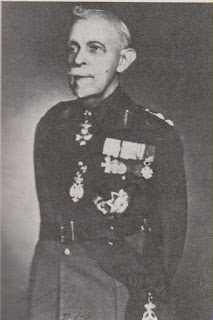
- Aristotelis Vlachopoulos in later life
- Born: c. 1866; Corfu, Kingdom of Greece
- Died: c. 1960; Athens, Kingdom of Greece
- Education: Hellenic Army Academy
- Military career
- Allegiance: Kingdom of Greece; (Greece) Second Hellenic Republic
- Branch: Hellenic Army
- Service years: 1887–1917; 1920–28
- Rank: Lieutenant General
- Unit: Army Staff Service
- Commands: V Army Corps; Chief of Hellenic Army General Staff; III Army Corps; II Army Corps; Asia Minor Superior General Military Command; IV Army Corps
- Wars: Greco-Turkish War (1897); Balkan Wars; First Balkan War; Second Balkan War; Greco-Turkish War (1919–22)
- Awards: Grand Commander of the Order of the Redeemer; Gold Cross of Valour; Medal of Military Merit; Order of the White Eagle; Legion of Honour

Aristotelis Vlachopoulos (Greek: Αριστοτέλης Βλαχόπουλος, 1866–1960) was a Hellenic Army officer who rose to the rank of Lieutenant General and served as Chief of the Hellenic Army General Staff in 1920–21.

== Life ==
He was born in Corfu in about 1866. He entered the Hellenic Army Academy and graduated on 12 August 1887 as an artillery second lieutenant. Promoted to lieutenant in 1892, he fought in the Greco-Turkish War of 1897 as a battery commander. He was subsequently appointed to the Army Staff Service, and served in it until 1913, being promoted to captain (1902), major (1910) and lieutenant colonel (1912).

In May 1914 he was placed as military attache to the Greek embassy to Serbia (then bound to Greece with a defensive alliance), returning in August 1915 to assume the direction of the Military Academy. Due to the mobilization ordered in September 1915, when Greek PM Eleftherios Venizelos prepared to come to Serbia's aid against the Austrian attack, the Academy was dismissed and Vlachopoulos was placed in command of the V Army Corps at Patras. During the National Schism, he sided with King Constantine I against Venizelos. He remained at Patras until May 1917, when he returned to head the Military Academy. After King Constantine's forced exile in June and the assumption of leadership by Venizelos, Vlachopoulos was suspended from active service and forcibly retired.

Following the Venizelist electoral defeat in November 1920, he was recalled to active duty and placed as Chief of the Army Staff Service. Soon, however, he requested and received a transfer to an operational command in Asia Minor, where he commanded the III Army Corps (January–May 1921) and II Army Corps (May–July 1921). He was then placed in charge of the Asia Minor Superior General Military Command, which covered the rear areas of the Army of Asia Minor, and in June 1922 he was dispatched to Eastern Thrace to assume command of the IV Army Corps. Following the defeat of the Greek army in Asia Minor by the Turks in August 1922, he was dismissed from active command and suspended from active duty in November 1923.

He finally retired in March 1928 after reaching the statutory age limit.

He died in 1960.

Military offices
Vacant Title last held by Major General Anastasios Charalambis	Chief of the Hellenic Army Staff Service; November 1920 – January 1921	Succeeded by Major General Konstantinos Gouvelis
