= Konstantinos Vlachopoulos =

- Κωνσταντίνος Βλαχόπουλος
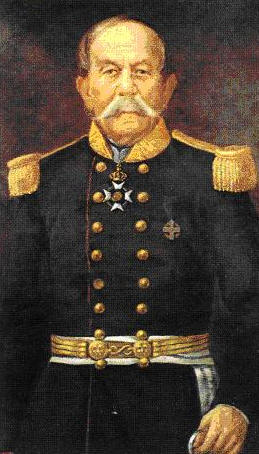
- A portrait of Konstantinos Vlachopoulos
- Born: c. 1789; Nicopolis, Eyalet of Yanina, Ottoman Empire (now Greece)
- Died: 1868; Athens, Kingdom of Greece
- Burial place: Garden of Heroes, Missolonghi, Greece
- Spouse: Ayşe
- Children: Nicholas Vlachopoulos
- Relatives: Alexakis Vlachopoulos (brother)
- Military career
- Allegiance: United Kingdom; First Hellenic Republic; Kingdom of Greece
- Branch: British Army; Hellenic Army
- Rank: Colonel
- Unit: 1st Regiment Greek Light Infantry
- Commands: Hellenic Gendarmerie
- Conflicts: Napoleonic Wars; Adriatic Campaign; Siege of Santa Maura; Greek War of Independence; Battle of Karpenisi; Second Siege of Missolonghi; Third Siege of Missolonghi; Battle of Phaleron
- Awards: Commander of the Order of the Redeemer
- Other work: Member of the Filiki Etaireia; Member of the Third National Assembly at Troezen

Konstantinos Vlachopoulos (Greek: Κωνσταντίνος Βλαχόπουλος, c. 1789–1868) was an armatolos, army leader of the Greek War of Independence and the first Greek commander of the Greek Royal Gendarmerie. He was also a member of the Filiki Eteria (Society of Friends), a secret organization whose purpose was to overthrow the Ottoman rule of Greece and establish an independent Greek state.

== Biography ==
He was born in 1789 in the area Nicopolis near Preveza, from a great family of Armatoloi, Christian Greek irregular soldiers, of Western Greece. During the pre-revolutionary period, he was, together with his brother Alexakis, also an armatolos. Later, because of Ali Pasha's persecution, he and his brother were forced to flee in Corfu. There, the two brothers joined the Greek battalions of the British Army . In 1819 he was initiated, along with his brothers, Alexios and Dimitrios, into the Filiki Eteria.

When the Greek Revolution broke out, he took part in the battle of Vrachori, in late May 1821. Later, he was involved in the persecution of the Albanian chieftain, Nourka Servani. Then, he contributed to the liberation of Zapanti. The following year, he became military leader of Vlochos and Agrinio provinces. He fought under the command of Markos Botsaris and excelled in the Battle of Karpenisi. In December 1823, he was promoted to chiliarch. He fought in the Second Siege of Messolonghi defending the bastion of Franklin. During the siege he was promoted to General. He survived the sortie of Messolonghi and fled to Attica where he fought together with Georgios Karaiskakis.

In 1827 he participated in the Third National Assembly at Troezen and during 1827-1829 he took part, under the command of General Richard Church, in the purges of Athens from the Ottomans. After the liberation, in 1833, he was appointed to the newly established Royal Gendarmerie and on 14 September 1841, he became its commander, becoming the first Greek who occupied this position. On 6 September 1843, he was replaced by Spyromilios. He retired having the rank of Colonel of Gendarmerie and died in Athens in 1868.

== Bibliography ==
- Konstantinos S. Antoniou, Ιστορία Ελληνικής Βασιλικής Χωροφυλακής 1833 – 1964, Ladias Eds., Athens 1964.
- Dionysios Kokkinos, Η Ελληνική Επανάστασις (6th Ed.), Melissa Eds., Athens 1974.
