= Chiliarch =

Military rank

Chiliarch is a military rank dating back to antiquity. Originally denoting the commander of a unit of about one thousand men (a chiliarchy) in the Macedonian army, it was subsequently used as a Greek translation of a Persian officer who functioned as a kind of vizier and of the Roman army's military tribunes. It has subsequently been used for other similar ranks and positions in other armed forces.

== Name ==
The English term chiliarch was borrowed from Latin chiliarchus, a transcription of Greek khilíarkhos (χιλίαρχος) and khiliárkhēs (χιλιάρχης), both meaning "commander of a thousand". The name has also occasionally been written as chiliarcha, chiliarchus, or chiliarchos or calqued as thousandman.

The chiliad or chiliarchy controlled by a chiliarch derives from Latin chiliarchia, from Greek khiliarkhía (χιλιαρχία).

== Ancient Macedon and Persia ==
In the Ancient Macedonian army, a chiliarch was the commander of a 1024-strong chiliarchy or taxis "order" of the pezhetairoi and the hypaspists heavy infantry, subdivided into 64 files (lochoi) of 16 men each. At the same time, officers known as pentakosiarchs ("commanders of 500") are also mentioned alongside the chiliarchs under both Alexander the Great and in the Ptolemaic armies, apparently as subordinate officers.

In addition, the title of chiliarch was used as the Greek equivalent of the Achaemenid title hazahrapatish (also transliterated azarapateis). The Achaemenid army was organized on a decimal basis, and the hazahrapatish was the commander of the melophoroi (μηλοφόροι, "apple-bearers"), the 1,000-strong personal bodyguard of the Achaemenid kings. The latter often played a role analogous to that of a majordomo or vizier in later times. The Persian office was in turn adopted by Alexander the Great, and first awarded to Hephaestion and after Hephaestion's death to Perdiccas. Likewise, Antipater shortly before his death named Polyperchon as strategos autokrator, but then named his own son Cassander as chiliarch, and thereby "second in authority" according to Diodorus Siculus (XVIII.48.4–5). This Persian-inspired office did not survive into subsequent Hellenistic practice. However, it was revived by later Iranian dynasties: while its existence in the Parthian Empire is unclear, it was certainly in existence in the 3rd century under the Sasanian Empire (Middle Persian: hazārbed or hazāruft). According to the 5th-century Armenian historian Elishe, it was equivalent to wuzurg framadār or prime minister. From Persian, the term also passed into Armenian as hazarapet and hazarwuxt.

== Roman and Byzantine Empires ==
Later Greek authors employed the term chiliarch for the Roman military tribunes, with the tribunus laticlavius in particular rendered χ[ε]ιλίαρχος πλατύσημος (ch[e]iliarchos platysemos). In the Byzantine Empire, the title was used as a more scholarly alternative to the rank of droungarios, chiefly in literary works, while in the later 10th century it became once more a technical term when Nikephoros II Phokas instituted 1,000-strong units termed chiliarchia or taxiarchia and commanded by a chiliarchos or taxiarches.

== Ancient Rus ==
A chiliarch, in Russian tysiatskii (Russian: тысяцкий), was a military leader in Kievan Rus' who commanded a people's volunteer army called a тысяча (tysyacha, or a thousand). In the Novgorod Republic, the chiliarch evolved into a judicial or commercial official and was elected from boyars at a veche for a period of one year. Like the posadniks in Novgorod, the office was often held by one man for several years in a row and he was often succeeded by his son or another close relative, indicating that the office was held within clans and was not fully elective.[1] In cities with no veche, chiliarchies were appointed by the knyaz or prince from among the noble boyars and could hand down their post to their sons. In the Novgorod Republic, chiliarchs were considered representatives of ordinary ("black") people. Along with the role as military leaders, they were also supposed to supervise the city fortifications, convene veches, act as ambassadors and as judges in the commercial courts. Like the posadniks, in the 14th century the former chiliarchs maintained considerable political influence and privileges and were known as "Old Chiliarchs". The earliest documented chiliarch of Novgorod was Putyata.

Grand Prince Dmitry Donskoy, after the death of Vassily Vassilyevich Velyaminov in 1374, abolished the post, replacing it with voyevodas and namestniks. The chiliarch in Novgorod was abolished when Grand Prince Ivan III of Moscow conquered the city in 1478. It was abolished in Pskov in 1510 when Vasily III of Russia took that city.

== Modern Greece ==
The title was once again revived during the Greek War of Independence. In January 1822, the First National Assembly at Epidaurus decided to create an organizational framework for the irregular troops of the various independent war leaders, and instituted a number of chiliarchies (χιλιαρχίες), each composed of ten centuries (εκατονταρχίες) of a hundred men under a hecatontarch (εκατόνταρχος, ekatontarchos). Each chiliarchy was commanded by a chiliarch, with a small staff comprising a deputy chiliarch (υποχιλίαρχος, ypochiliarchos), a subaltern known as taxiarchos, a physician, a surgeon, a quartermaster and a priest.

In 1828, the chiliarchies were reorganized and reduced to three, each now comprising two pentakosiarchies (πεντακοσιαρχίες) of five centuries each, comprising 1120 men in total. Each chiliarch had a small staff comprising an adjutant, a secretary, a priest, a doctor, a paymaster and a quartermaster, while a flag bearer and a trumpeter were allocated to each pentakosiarchy. The 1828-model chiliarchies were abolished after the Battle of Petra in July 1829, and thirteen light infantry battalions (tagmata) formed instead.

== Hungary ==
The Hungarian rank of ezredes, literally "of a thousand", is the modern, commonly used abbreviation of the obsolete term of ezereskapitány, literally "captain of a thousand". (The term ezereskapitány was used in the War of the Spanish Succession (1701–1714), the ezredes has been used since the Revolutions of 1848.)

An ezredes is the leader of a regiment (about 1000–1500 men in Hungary) and this rank is equivalent to the rank of colonel or major. The term ezredes is used by the Hungarian army (officially the Hungarian Defence Force) and police force too.

== Turkey ==
The Turkish rank of binbaşı, literally "head of a thousand", is equivalent to the Commonwealth and US rank of Major.

== Israel ==
An aluf (Hebrew: אלוף, romanized: allūp̄ "chilliarch") is the term used in the Israel Defense Forces (IDF) for officers who in other countries would have the rank of general, air marshal, or admiral. There are five chiliarch ranks, constituting the five highest ranks in the IDF. The term aluf comes from a Semitic root meaning "thousand", making an aluf the one who commands a thousand people. The Israel Defense Forces (IDF) is an integrated force, ranks are the same in all services.

- Chief chiliarch, Rav aluf (רב-אלוף): the highest rank in IDF
- Chiliarch, Aluf
- Sub-chiliairch, 'Tat aluf (תת-אלוף)
- Secondary chiliarch, Aluf mishne (אלוף-משנה)
- Deputy chiliarch, Sgan aluf (סגן-אלוף)

== See also ==
- chiliad, a group of 1000 things
- millennium, a group of 1000 years
- Chiliast, an alternative name for Millenarians
