= Areopagus of Eastern Continental Greece =

Regional government during the Greek War of Independence

Eastern Continental Greece Ανατολική Χέρσος Ελλάς
- 1821–1825
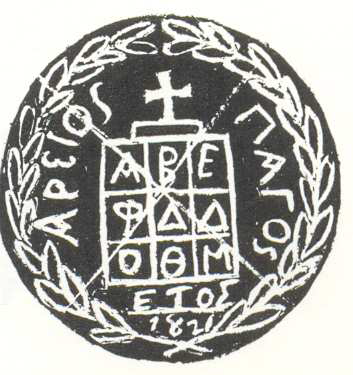
- Flag Seal
- Status: Regional government in revolt against the Ottoman Empire
- Capital: Salona (modern Amfissa)
- Common languages: Greek
- Religion: Greek Orthodox
- Government: Republic
- President
- Legislature: Areopagus
- History
  - Established: 25 March 1821
  - Disestablished: 1825
Preceded by	Succeeded by
Ottoman Empire	First Hellenic Republic

The Areopagus of Eastern Continental Greece (Greek: Άρειος Πάγος της Ανατολικής Χέρσου Ελλάδος) was a provisional regime that existed in eastern Central Greece during the Greek War of Independence.

== Background ==
During the first stages of the Greek Revolution against the Ottoman Empire, there existed no overall authority over the rebels. Each region separately elected its own assemblies and tried to put together an administration to coordinate the struggle. One of the first such entities was established in eastern continental Greece ("Roumeli").

== History ==
The uprising began in March, and established itself with the capture of the provincial capital, Salona (modern Amfissa), on 27 March 1821. The Ottoman garrison held out in the citadel until April 10, when the Greeks took it. At the same time, the Greeks suffered a defeat at the Battle of Alamana against the army of Omer Vryonis, which resulted in the death of Athanasios Diakos. But the Ottoman advance was stopped at the inn of Gravia, under the leadership of Odysseas Androutsos, who was subsequently named commander-in-chief of Eastern Greece. Vryonis turned towards Boeotia and sacked Livadia, awaiting reinforcements before proceeding towards the Morea. These forces, 8,000 men under Beyran Pasha, were however met and defeated at the Battle of Vassilika, on August 26. This defeat forced Vryonis too to withdraw, securing both Eastern Greece and the Morea.

== The Administration of Eastern Greece ==
Vryonis' defeat paved the way for the political organization of the freed territories. In 15–20 November 1821, a council was held in Salona, where the main local notables and military chiefs participated. Under the direction of Theodoros Negris, they set down a proto-constitution for the region, the "Legal Order of Eastern Continental Greece" (Νομική Διάταξις της Ανατολικής Χέρσου Ελλάδος), and established a governing council, the Areopagus, composed of 70 notables from eastern Continental Greece as well as the regions of Thessaly and Macedonia, where the Greek uprisings would soon be suppressed.

Officially, the Areopagus was superseded by the central Provisional Administration, established in January 1822 after the First National Assembly, but the council continued its existence and exercised considerable authority, albeit in the name of the national government. However, the relationship was often tense, especially as Greece soon entered a phase of virtual civil war.

== Members ==
- Ioannis Filonos from Livadeia
- Vassilakis Kalkos from Livadeia
- Rigas Kontorigas from Salona
- Panagiotis Kondilis from Lidoriki
- Neofytos Talantiou from Atalanti
- Georgios Ainian from Patratziki
- Konstantinos Sakelion from Agrafa
- Ioannis Skandalidis from Macedonia
- Anthimos Gazis from Thessaly
- Drosos Mansolas from Thessaly
- Theodoros Negris, President of the Areopagus, from Zitouni
- Panousis Sabontzis from Thebes
- Ioannis Eirinaios from Athens
- Konstantinos Chatziioannou from Chalkida
