= Battle of Gravia Inn =

1821 battle of the Greek War of Independence

- Part of the Greek War of Independence
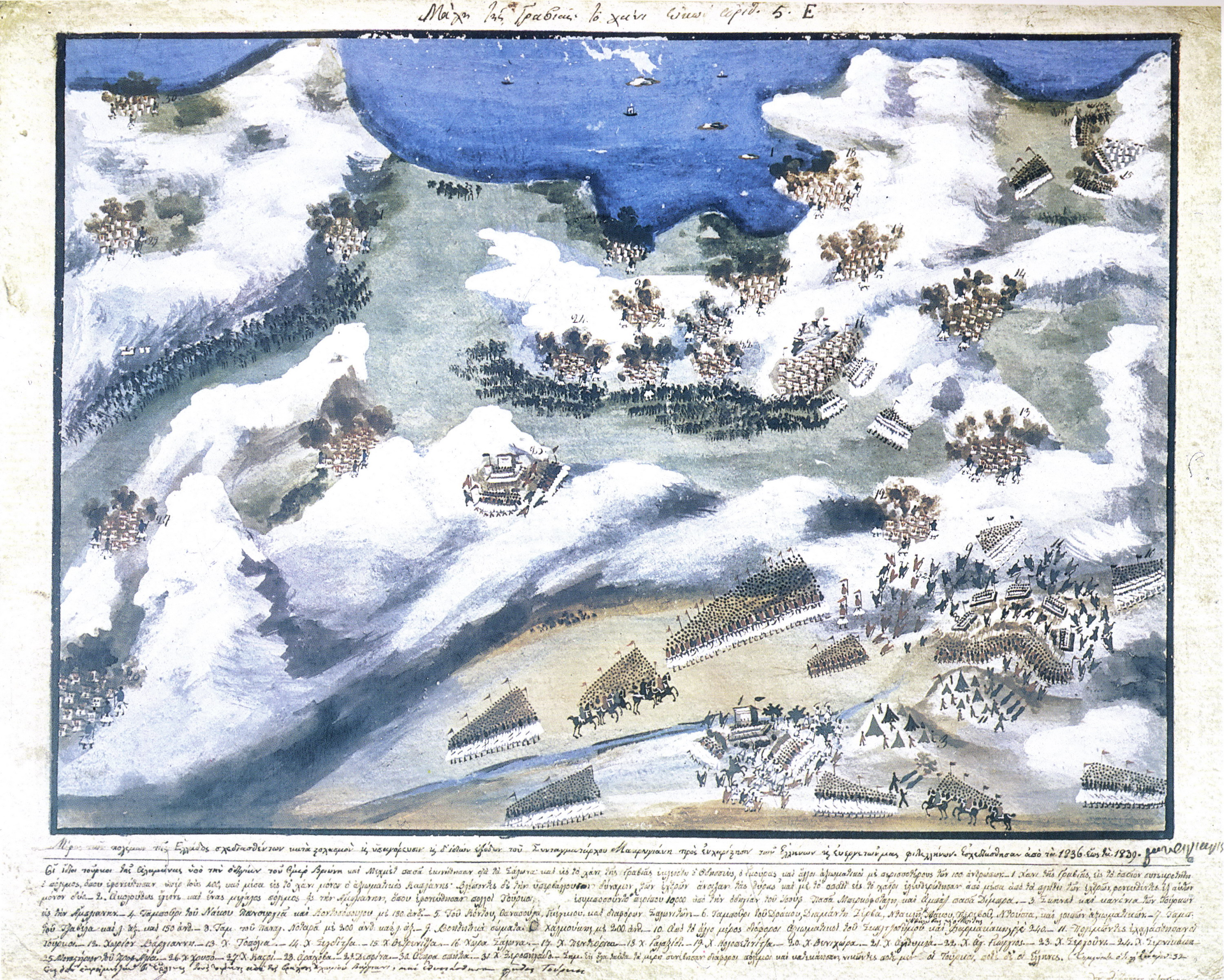
- The Battle of Gravia Inn
Date	8 May 1821
Location	Gravia, Sanjak of Eğriboz, Ottoman Empire (now Phocis, Greece) 38.6711°N 22.4289°E
Result	See aftermath; Ottomans suffer heavy casualties; Greeks managed to escape; Ottomans under Omer Vrioni forced to retreat to Euboea

Belligerents
Greek revolutionaries	Ottoman Empire

Commanders and leaders
Odysseas Androutsos; Yannis Gouras; Angelis Govios	Omer Vrioni; Köse Mehmed

Strength
117–120	8,000–9,000

Casualties and losses
2–6 killed	150–300 killed 600 wounded

The Battle of Gravia Inn (Greek: Μάχη στο Χάνι της Γραβιάς) was fought between Greek revolutionaries and the Ottoman Empire during the Greek War of Independence. The Greek leaders Odysseas Androutsos, Yannis Gouras and Angelis Govios, with a group of c. 120 men, repulsed an Ottoman army numbering 8,000 to 9,000 men and artillery under the command of Omer Vrioni and Köse Mehmed. The battle ended with heavy losses for the Ottomans and minimal casualties on the Greek side.

The Ottoman army under the command of Omer Vrioni, following his defeat of the Greeks at the Battle of Alamana and the execution of their leader, Athanasios Diakos, planned to attack the Peloponnese with an army of 11,000 men. However, his army was met by a Greek group numbering 120 men, under the command of Odysseas Androutsos, who had barricaded themselves inside an old inn. The Ottoman army surrounded the area and attacked the inn but was driven back with heavy losses. At night, while the Ottoman army paused their attacks to bring up some cannons in order to bombard the inn, the Greeks escaped the inn and found safety in the mountains before the cannons arrived.

This battle is considered important to the outcome of the Greek revolution because it forced Omer Vrioni to retreat to Euboea, leaving the Greeks to consolidate their gains in the Peloponnese and capture the Ottoman capital of the Peloponnese, Tripoli.

== Background ==
In May 1821, after crushing the Greek resistance at the Battle of Alamana and putting Athanasios Diakos to death, Omer Vrioni headed south into the Peloponnese from his base at Lamia, seeking to crush the Greek rebellion with an army of 8,000 Albanian men. However, as he was advancing, a Greek revolutionary captain, Odysseas Androutsos, and 120 men fortified themselves in an old inn near the centre of the road.

The other two Greek captains who had come with Androutsos, Dimitrios Panourgias and Ioannis Dyovouniotis, took their men and assumed a higher position on the other side of the road. They did this because they assumed that Androutsos' stand would end up a disaster like Alamana and being up high would allow them to retreat, and also to flank the assailants and cover Androutsos' men's possible retreat, if needed. When Vrioni arrived he dispersed his men through the hills and surrounded the inn. He sent a Dervish to negotiate with Androutsos, but when he was shot dead at the door Vrioni ordered the attack.

== Battle ==
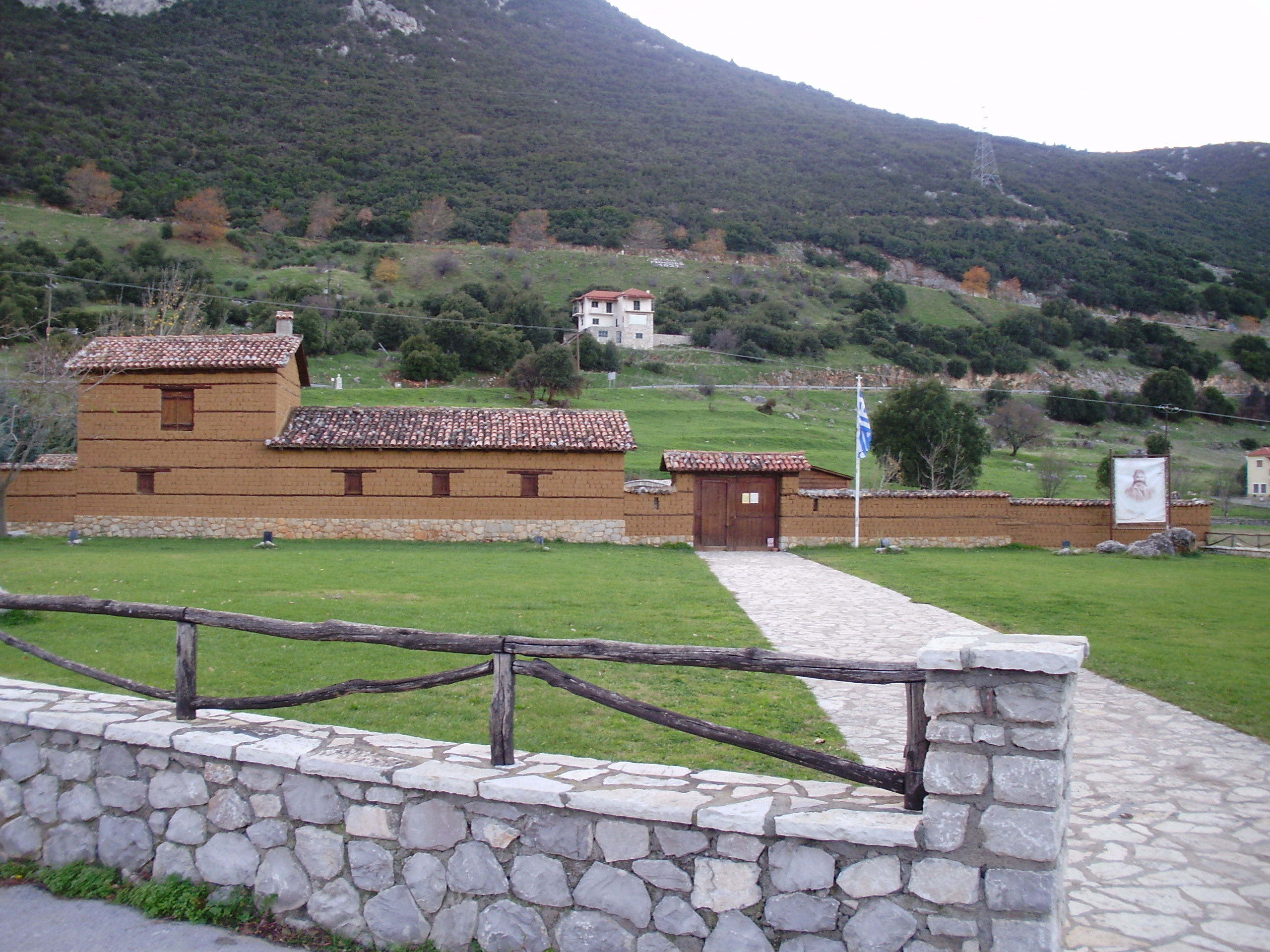
The reconstructed inn of Gravia

As soon as Vrioni ordered the attack, a detachment of Albanian soldiers charged the building. As they entered the building they were met by a barrage of gunfire. The Albanians were forced to retreat under heavy fire and suffered many casualties from the concealed Greeks. Androutsos had trained his men to fire by a European method: one group of his soldiers would fire in unison, while another group would reload their guns to fire in turn and so forth. The following Ottoman assaults also met a barrage of fire and were forced to retreat.

Vrioni, enraged by the losses he was suffering, ordered cannons to be brought from Lamia. However, Androutsos had guessed his intention and retreated with his men in the night; they left the inn and escaped into the mountains while the Albanians slept.

== Aftermath ==
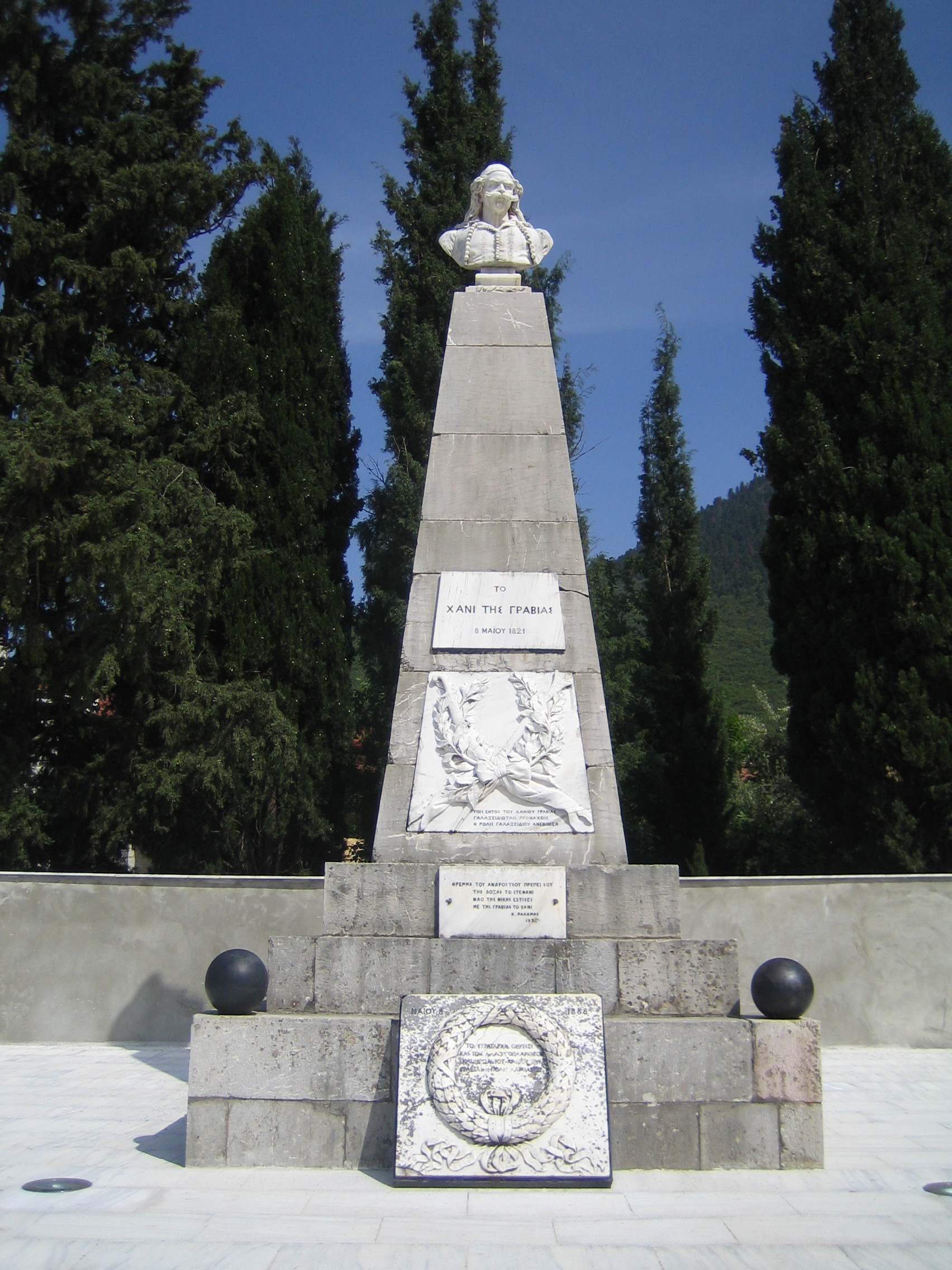
Monument of Androutsos in Gravia

The casualties suffered by Vrioni were heavy, with 300 soldiers dead and 600 wounded in a couple of hours of fighting, while the Greeks had only six countrymen dead. This battle shocked him into uncertainty and he decided to retreat to the island of Euboea, just off the coast of Attica, where he would later combine forces with Köse Mehmed. Although the final outcome of the battle is considered to be ambiguous, it is often recognized as a Greek victory of attrition. However, both Androutsos and Omer Vrioni finally retreated, so the outcome is quite equivocal. Nevertheless the Battle of Gravia was considered to be an important event in the Greek War of Independence. By forcing Vrioni to retreat, Androutsos allowed the Greeks in the Peloponnese to have more time to consolidate their gains as well as to capture the Ottoman capital of the Peloponnese, Tripoli.

== Notes ==
a: Odysseas Androutsos had grown up in Ali Pasha's court, where he received a military education.
b: Due to the proper fortification of the inn and the irregularity of the Ottoman Albanians, the Greeks had few casualties.
