= Skandalidis =

Skandalidis (Greek: Σκανδαλίδης) is a Greek surname. Notable people with the surname include:

- Ioannis Skandalidis (1775–1826), Greek politician
- Kostas Skandalidis (born 1953), Greek politician
