= Dimitrios Panourgias =

Greek military commander

- Δημήτριος Πανουργιάς
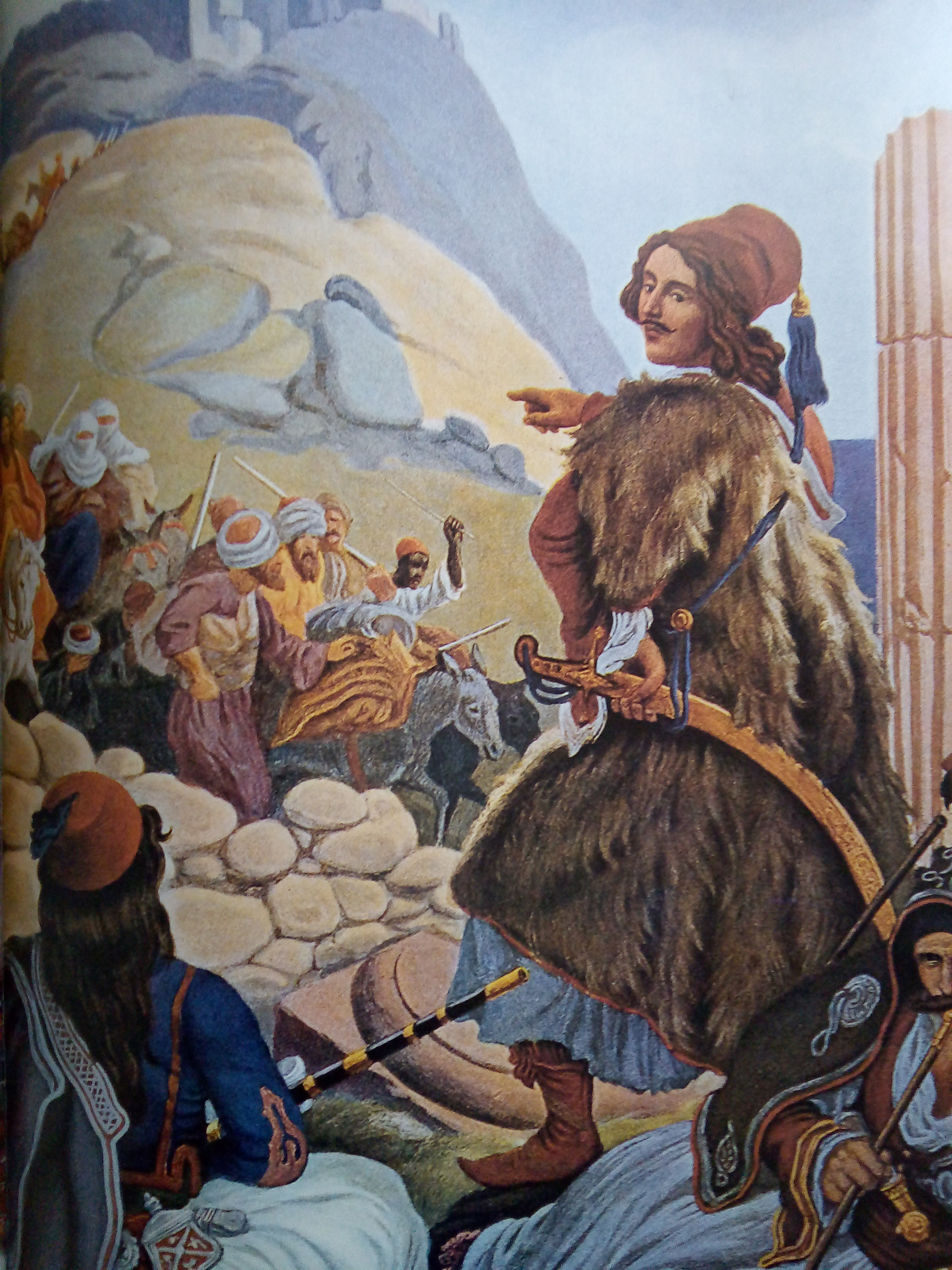
- Panourias in Acrocorinth by Peter von Hess.
- Born: Dimitrios Xiros (Δημήτριος Ξηρός) c. 1754; Dremissa, Eyalet of the Archipelago, Ottoman Empire (now Kallieis, Greece)
- Died: c. 1834; Salona, Kingdom of Greece (now Amfissa)
- Relatives: Nakos Panourgias (son); Yiannis Gouras (cousin)
- Military career
- Allegiance: Filiki Etaireia (Greece) First Hellenic Republic
- Branch: Hellenic Army
- Conflicts: Greek war of independence: Battle of Gravia Inn; Battle of Vasilika
- Other work: Representative of Salona at the First National Assembly at Epidaurus

Dimitrios Panourgias (Greek: Δημήτριος Πανουργιάς; 1754-1834), a Greek military commander during the Greek War of Independence.

== Early life ==
According to his family's tradition, they ultimately originated from Constantinople and escaped to Central Greece after the city fell to the Ottomans. The family, whose name originally was Xiros (Greek: Ξηρός), likely originated from the village Agios Georgios of Parnassida in Phocis. Upon the start of the Ottoman-Venetian war (1684-1699) the Xiros, among other families, established themselves in the near-by islands of Amfissa (then known as Salona), and after the treaty of Karlowitz (1699) they had moved and settled to the Phocian village of Dremissa where Panourgias was born. The legend had that his godfather, who baptised him, thought he was a girl and named him with the female name Panorea (Πανωραία, "very beautiful"), and because the baptismal name may not be changed in Greek Orthodoxy, he became known by a masculinized version of that name that later became the family last name.

== Klepht and Armatolos ==
Panourias in early age took part in the Orlov revolt, against the Ottomans, under Lambros Katsonis. In 1790 he entered the armatoluk of Androutsos Verousis (father of Odysseas Androutsos) and for a short time became commander of the Salona armatoluk with the support of Ali Pasha, but quickly abandoned his position and turned himself into a klepht.

In 1816, however he rejoined Ali Pasha and was once more appointed as an armatolos in the Salona district. It was there where he became a member of the Filiki Eteria.

== Greek War of Independence ==
On 24 March 1821 he declared the Revolution in Salona, forcing the surrender of the Ottoman garrison on 10 April. The surrendering Ottomans were massacred by Panourgias' men; by his personal intervention, he managed to save a handful of them.

He then collaborated with Athanasios Diakos and Dyovouniotis in order to halt Omer Vryonis from advancing further into Central Greece. Panourgias with his band was to defend the hills of Chalkomata, near Thermopylae, but was seriously wounded during the fights and had to withdraw.

He later was one of the defenders of the eponymous inn in the Battle of Gravia Inn, and fought in the Battle of Vasilika, the surrender of Corinth, the Battle of Ambliani, the battle of Haidari, the Battle of Distomo, and other battles.

He participated in January, 1822 to the First National Assembly at Epidaurus as representative of Salona. He retired from military operations some months later, after he handed the leadership of his militia band to his son, Nakos Panourgias.

He died in 1834 at Salona.
