= Odysseas Androutsos =

Greek military leader (c. 1788 – 1825)

- Οδυσσέας Ανδρούτσος
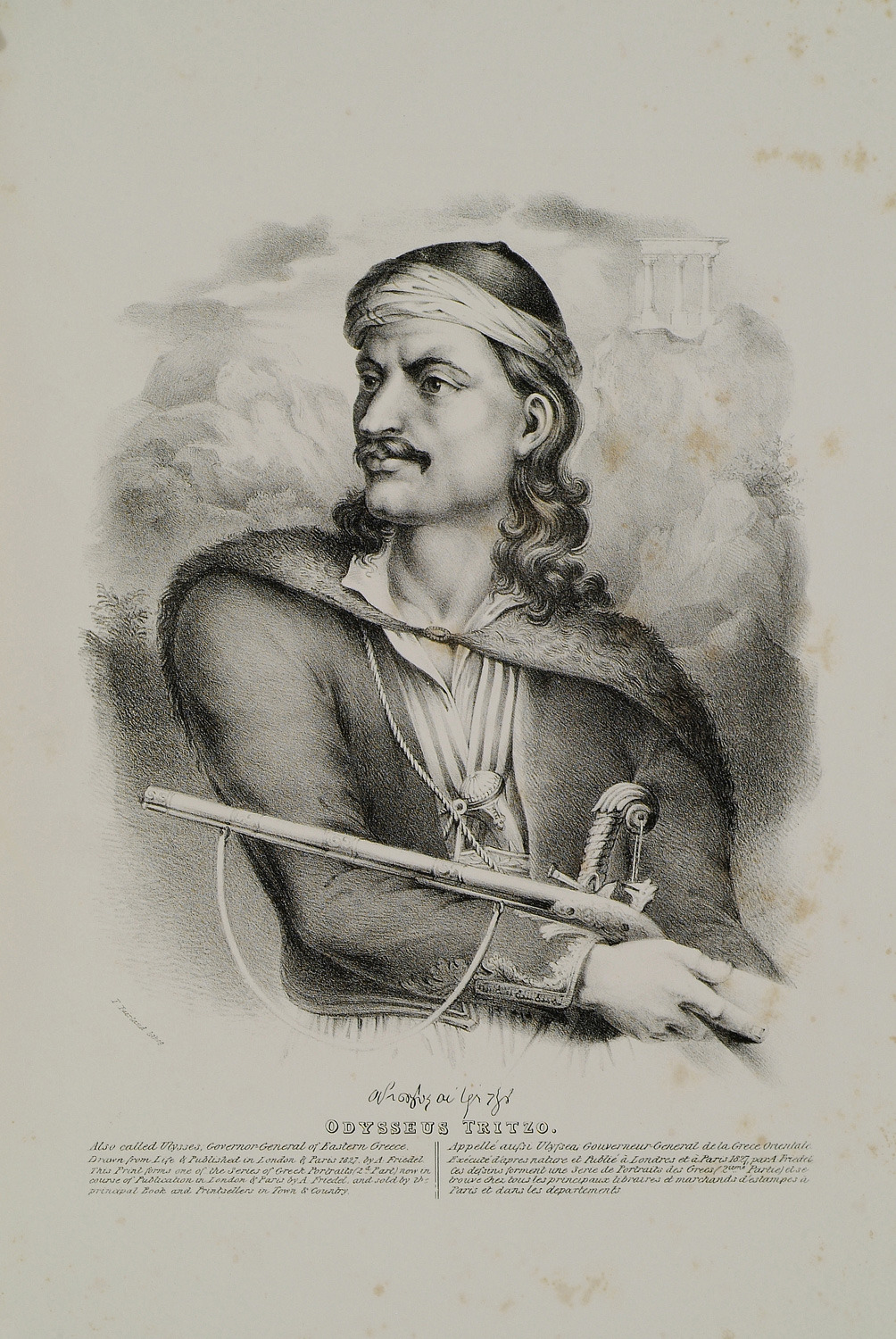
- Portrait of Androutsos entitled Odysseus Tritzo (Adam Friedel, 1830).
- Born: Odysseas Verousis; Οδυσσέας Βερούσης c. 1788–1790; Ithaca, Republic of Venice (now Greece)
- Died: 5 June 1825 (aged 37); Frankish Tower, Athens, First Hellenic Republic
- Burial place: Base of the north side of the Acropolis (1825–1865); First Cemetery of Athens (1865–1967); Central square of Preveza (1967–present)
- Spouse: Eleni Kareli
- Children: Leonidas Androutsos
- Relatives: Andreas Verousis (father); Akrivi Tsarlampa (mother); Lambros Katsonis (godfather)
- Military career
- Allegiance: Pashalik of Yanina (1805/1810–1820); Revolutionary Greece (1821); First Hellenic Republic (1822–1825); Ottoman Empire (1825)
- Branch: Hellenic Army
- Nickname: Kapudan Disava
- Commands: Commander-in-Chief of Central Greece
- Conflicts: Greek War of Independence (executed); Battle of Gravia Inn; Battle of Vasilika
- Other work: Member of the Filiki Etaireia

Odysseas Androutsos (Greek: Οδυσσέας Ανδρούτσος; 1788–1790 – 1825; born Odysseas Verousis Οδυσσέας Βερούσης) was a Greek armatolos in eastern continental Greece and a prominent figure of the Greek War of Independence.

Born in Ithaca, the son of an Arvanite klepht and privateer from Roumeli and a Greek mother from a family of notables from Preveza in the Ionian Islands. He joined the court of his father's old friend, the Ottoman Albanian ruler Ali Pasha of the increasingly independent Pashalik of Yanina, became one of his commanders and was appointed armatolos of Livadeia in 1816. In 1818 or 1820 he became a member of the Greek revolutionary organization Filiki Eteria.

When Ali Pasha rebelled against the Sultan, Androutsos initially supported Ali, but he abandoned besieged Yannina for the Ionian Islands in October 1820. He joined the Greek War of Independence in 1821, and he was distinguished as a commander in the Battle of Gravia Inn in May 1821. As a result of the battle, he was appointed military commander of eastern mainland Greece by the Greek revolutionary government. Androutsos was twice accused by the Greek revolutionary government of treachery owing to his negotiating initiative with his Albanian enemies as a means of effective distraction when he could not repel them. In 1824 Androutsos did not take sides in the Greek civil war. After falling out with the rebels in 1825, he asked for and received amnesty from the Imperial court, switching allegiances permanently and joining the army of the Ottoman Albanian ruler Omer Vrioni, pasha of Ioannina. In a battle near Livadeia, he was captured by the units of the revolutionary army and executed a few days later.

Scholars have variously described him as a hero or a traitor to the Greek cause in the Greek War of Independence. In Greece he is today considered one of the most prominent heroes of the Greek War of Independence.

== Early life ==
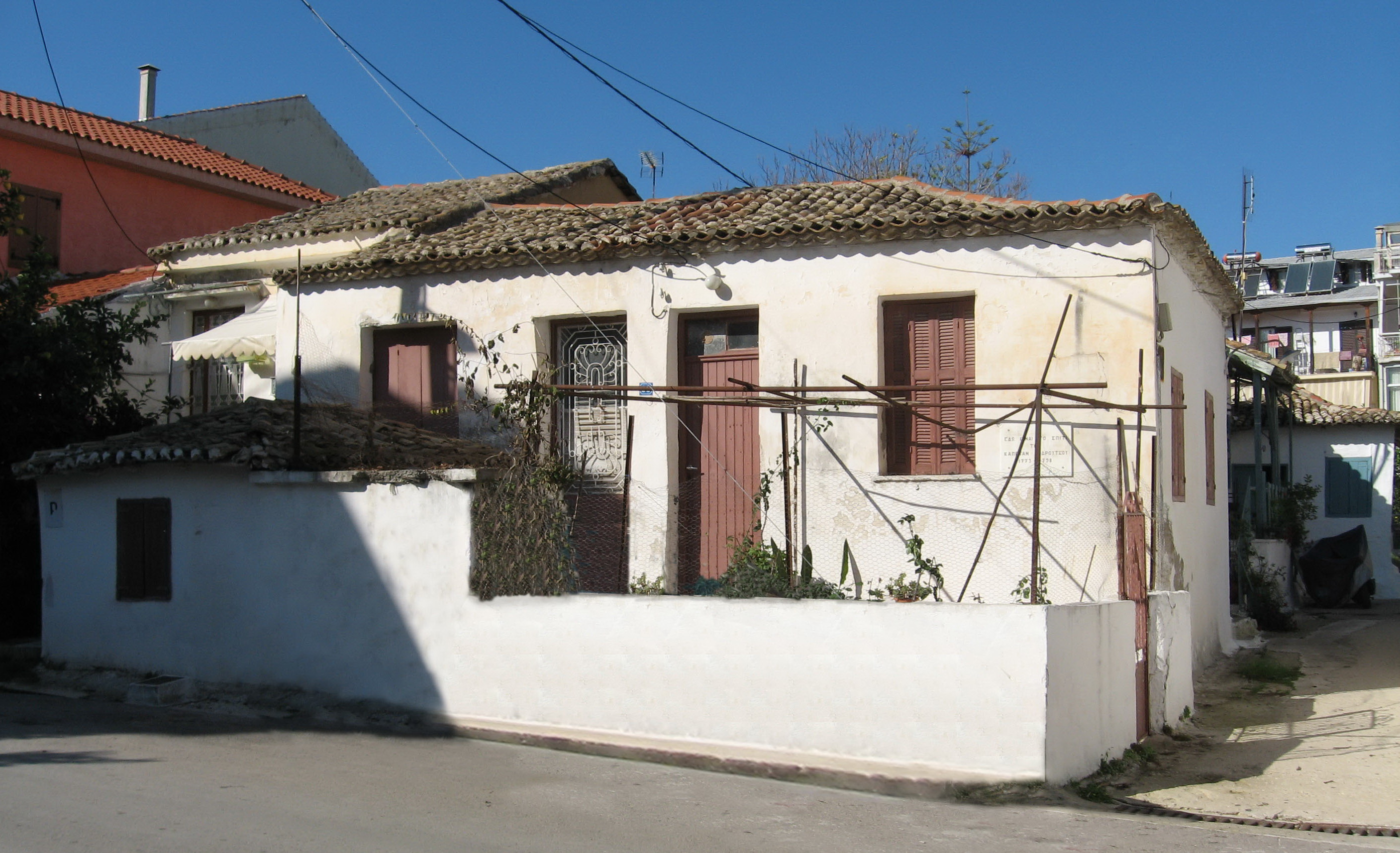
The house of Androutsos's father in Preveza (2008).

Androutsos born in Ithaca between 1788 and 1790. His father was Andreas Verousis (Greek: Ανδρέας Βερούσης, Albanian: Andruc Verushi), an Albanian and klepht from Livanates, in Phthiotis prefecture, who sought to become armatolos of Livadeia and later cooperated with Ali pasha, became again a klepht and finally joined Lambros Katsonis (Greek: Λάμπρος Κατσώνης) as a privateer in the Greek insurrection of 1770. He was raised by his mother Akrivi Tsarlampa (Greek: Ακριβή Τσαρλαμπά), a native of Preveza. His godparents were Maria Sofianou, Katsonis's wife, and Ioannis Zavos, a notable of Ithaca, who gave him a name that relates to the reappropriation of antiquity by Orthodox Christians in the context of the modern Greek Enlightenment.

Odysseas did not get to know his father, who was captured in 1792 and committed to an Ottoman jail, where he died. He was raised by his mother's family of wealthy notables from Preveza, who also moved in Lefkada and Ithaki. In the Ionian islands, ruled by Western powers at the time, he grew up in a social environment that received modern ideas, including the reevaluation of Greek antiquity by Greek Enlightenment scholars. After his mother's family participated in the failed defense of Preveza against the attack of Ali Pasha in 1798, they sought refuge to Lefkada, where Odysseas was raised for two years along with future poet Ioannis Zambelios.

== Ali Pasha era ==
As his family probably faced economic difficulties, influenced by his father's fame and, as per his biographers, due to his father's old acquaintance with Ali Pasha, at a certain point between 1805 and 1810 Odysseas opted to follow a career as a man of arms and decided to join Ali's army in Ioannina, signifying a shift of his family's orientation towards the only stable power of the area. Odysseas is recorded to have taken part and displayed his military qualities in Ali's campaign against Berat, Gjirokastër and the Christians of Kardhiq. Androutsos was among Ali's closest military personnel, who also became members of his personal guard. In March 1814 he had become the leader of Ali's personal guard. In Ali's court Androutsos became one of his distinguished armatoles. Most of the armatoles had learned their military skills among the Christian Albanian Souliotes and other Albanian groups who had a renowned tradition in irregular warfare. Androutsos also managed to learn Albanian and Italian fluently. Androutsos was influenced by Ali Pasha's political attitudes and behavior: as such Androutsos became later particularly notorious for his brutality, suspiciousness and personal ambition. Androutsos was soon found in antagonism with Ali's men, as such Ali had ordered his execution but was saved after intervention by Alexis Noutsos. While at Yanina, Odysseas, influenced by the religiously liberal environment of the city and probably in an effort to enter a support network, joined the Bektashi order, as Ali pasha is also said to have. Religion was not a determinant factor for Odysseas and, even during the Greek Revolution, two of his most trusted lieutenants were Muslim.

In 1816 Ali Pasha positioned him as armatolos of Livadeia in eastern central Greece. In a short time Odysseas managed to restore security in his region, with minor klephts, like Yannis Gouras, joining his tayfa and stronger, like Dimitrios Panourgias, being forced to submit, and implemented Ali's policy and traditional armatole practice of raids in neighboring areas, namely Athens and Evia. With Ali's support and using despotic methods, he came into conflict with Christian and Muslim notables and succeeded in curbing their power. While an armatolos, he used his authority to increase his economic power, formed a close circle of trusted lieutenants, like Gouras and Angelis Govginas, amassed considerable mobile property, married Eleni Kareli, daughter of a notable of Kalarrytes, and emerged as the most powerful man of arms in eastern Central Greece. It seems that he was promoted to general derven-aga of eastern Central Greece, a superintendent of the region's armatoloi.

Along with Athanasios Diakos, Androutsos became a member of the Filiki Eteria, an organisation that aimed at the independence of Greece, in 1818 or 1820. At the time, the Eteria was drafting members without requesting full agreement to its revolutionary, military and political program, which, besides, had not been yet finalised. In a council of Ali's armatoloi in spring 1820, when military conflict with the Sultan seemed impending, Androutsos was tasked with the defense of Livadeia. In June 1820 Androutsos and other Ali Pasha's advisors urged him to convert to Christianity arguing that this would bind the Greeks more solidly to his cause. When in June or July the Sultan's army reached Livadeia, Odysseas, whose course and interests were identical to those of Ali, sought to combat against the Sultan, but the armatoloi of his band and the local notables, who wished to get rid of his despotic rule, chose to submit and Androutsos lost the armatolik of Livadeia to Athanasios Diakos, his thitherto first lieutenant, and went to Yannina.

In late 1820, the Ottomans sent an army to remove Ali Pasha from power in Yannina. Androutsos, who was aware of the plans of the upcoming Greek revolts, met on 1 September 1820 with Albanian commanders from Ali Pasha's court who had defected to the Ottomans – including Omer Vrioni, Ali Pasha's steward. He condemned their betrayal of Ali Pasha and after negotiations they all signed an agreement, which stipulated that in the upcoming revolt in Greece they would not send their troops against the rebels, but revolt in favor of Ali Pasha. When during autumn the Sultan seemed to gain the upped hand, Androutsos abandoned besieged Yannina for the Ionian islands in October. In January 1821, Androutsos together with the other armatoli of Rumeli, among them Georgios Varnakiotis, Dimitrios Panourgias, Dimitrios Makris, Georgios Karaiskakis, gathered at Lefkada and agreed to join the upcoming Greek revolution.

== Greek Revolution ==
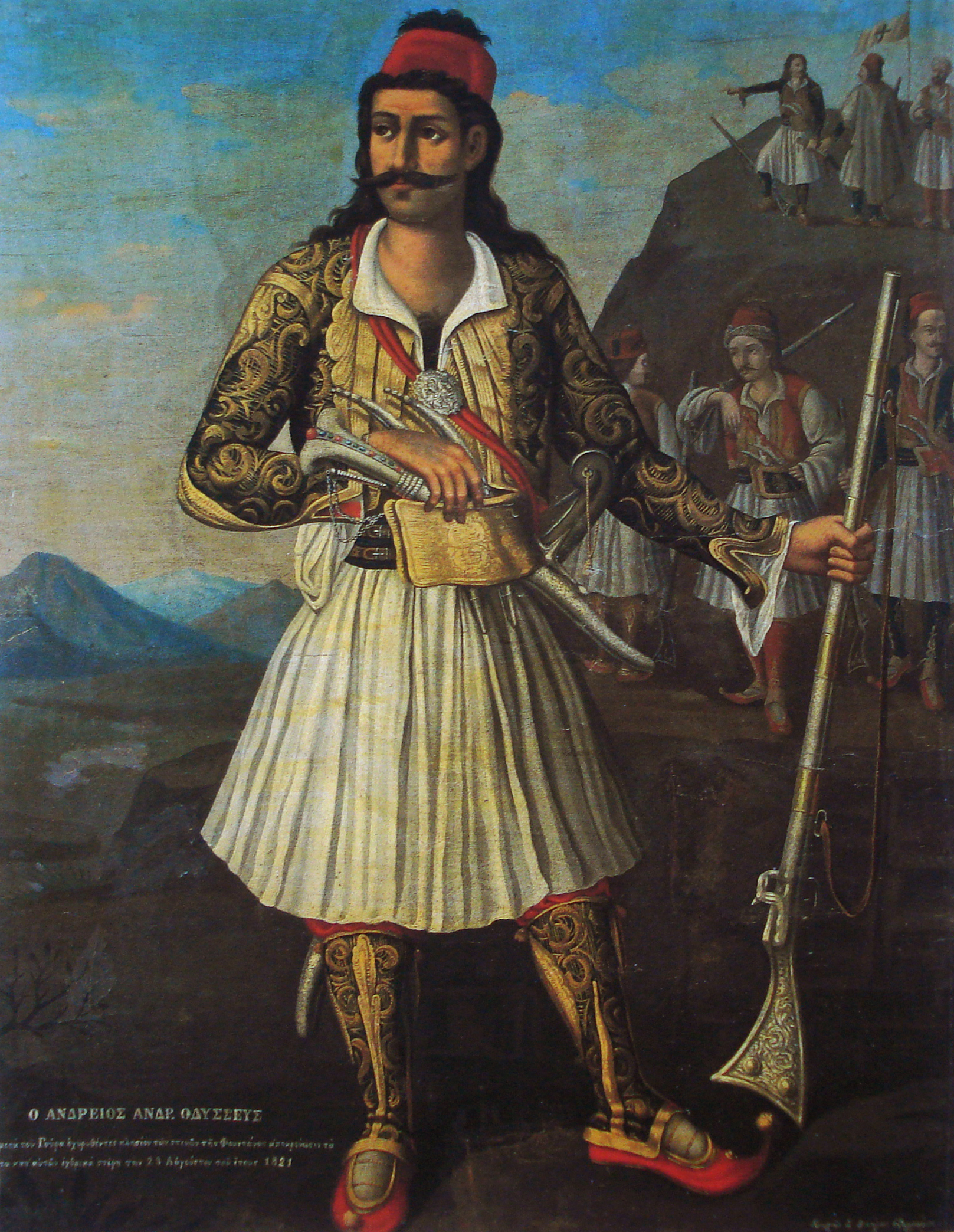
Portrait of Odysseus Androutsos by Kozis Desyllas.

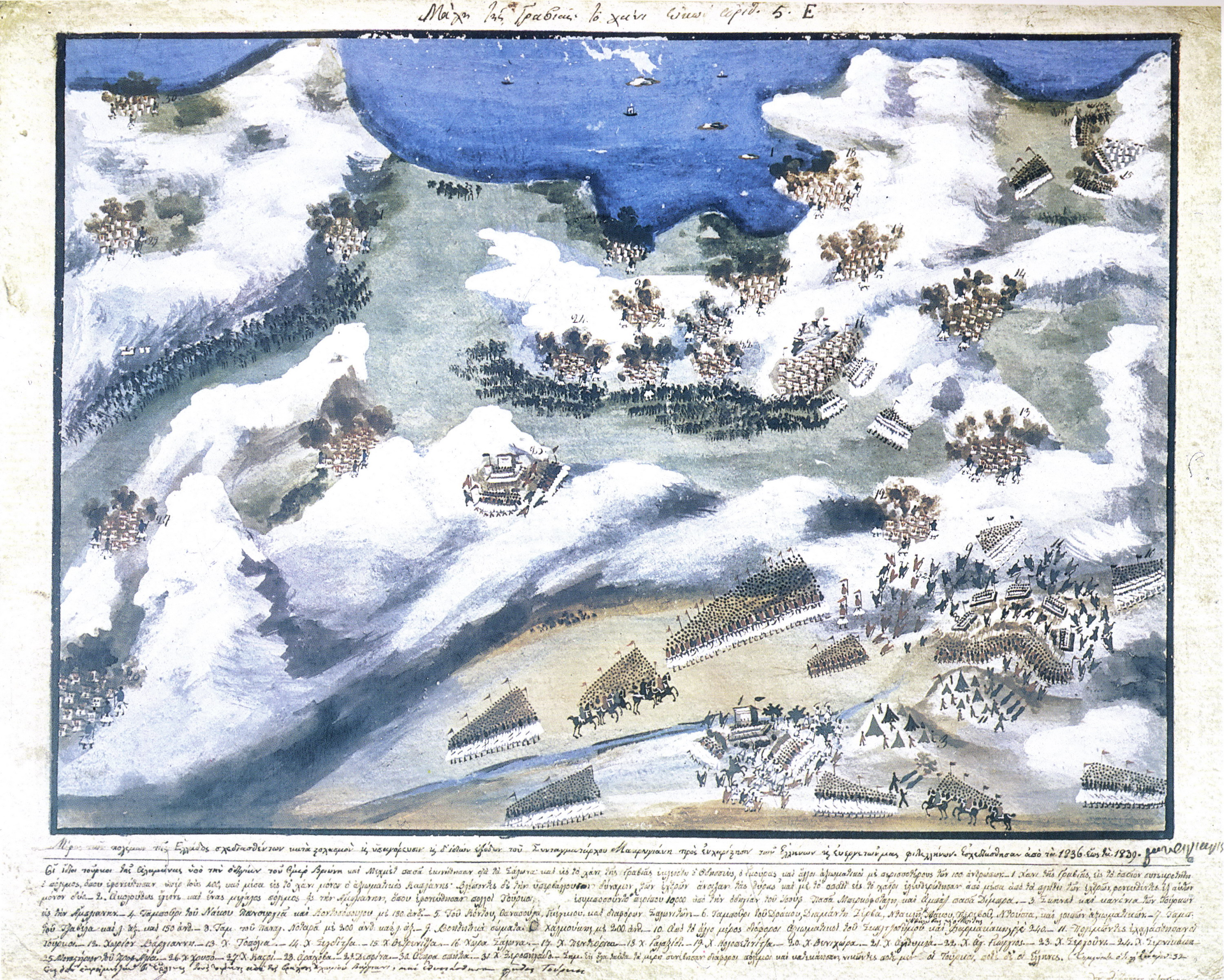
Depiction of the Battle of the Inn of Gravia by Panagiotis Zographos.

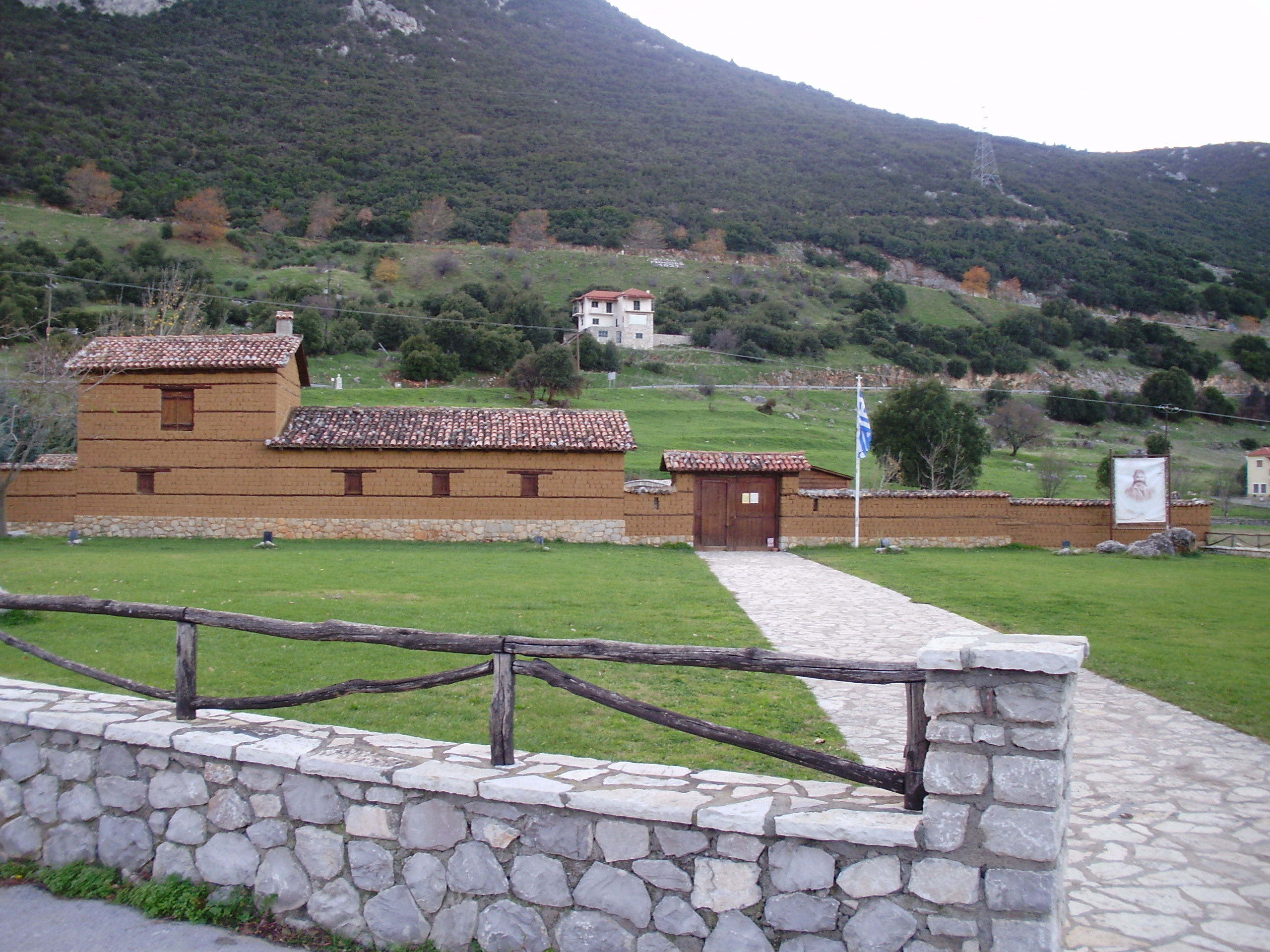
Gravia Inn.

In March 1821 Androutsos went to western Continental Greece, where he tried to organise local chieftains, notables and Albanian agas against the Sultan and made a failed attempt to force the region's armatoloi to revolt by attacking Ottomans in Tatarna of Evritania. In May 1821, Omer Vrioni, now the commander of the Ottoman army, advanced with 8,000 men, after crushing the resistance of the Greeks at the river of Alamana and putting Athanasios Diakos to death, headed south into the Peloponnese to crush the Greek uprising.

With Diakos, his opponent, dead, the field was now auspicious for Androutsos to return to Livadeia and assume a leading position in eastern Central Greece. With a band of 100 or so men, he took up a defensive position at an inn near Gravia, supported by Panourgias and Diovouniotis and their men. Vrioni attacked the inn but was repulsed with heavy casualties of over 300 dead. Finally, he was forced to ask for reinforcements and artillery, but the Greeks managed to slip out before the reinforcements arrived. Androutsos lost six men in the battle and earned the title of Commander in Chief of the Greek forces in Central Greece.

Androutsos sought to establish his power base in Attica and Euboea and sent his bands to the region in 1822. In April 1822, Androutsos, in cooperation with other revolutionary leaders, attempted to thwart Dramali’s expedition in Phthiotis. His plan failed, however, because the Greek Government did not provide him with the military supplies that he had requested. Androutsos's failure in Phthiotis was used as a pretext by the Government to degrade him, and two other revolutionaries, Christos Palaskas and Alexios Noutsos, were sent to replace him. Palaskas was to relieve him of the military command and Noutsos was to take over the taxation apparatus, but Androutsos had both men killed. The regional assembly, fearing for their lives, fled to other areas and the army of Dramali passed through his area of command virtually untouched. In the consequent clash with his political opponent Ioannis Kolettis and the Areopagus of Eastern Continental Greece, he was accused of collaboration with the Ottomans and the government dismissed him from his commanding duties. However, he was soon restored and kept his command in Eastern Central Greece. In September 1822, at the insistence of the Athenian municipal authorities, Androutsos, Yannis Gouras, and Yannis Makriyannis took control of the Acropolis of Athens, which had been surrendered in June. To ensure the occupation he had a bastion built to protect the ancient Klepsydra spring, which had just been rediscovered by chance on the north-western slope of the rock. Androutsos made himself general-in-chief of Attica, and sent his men to plunder the wealthy villages of the region.

In late 1822 Androutsos contacted the Ottomans and offered to sign a secret agreement under which he would recognize their authority if they gave him a hereditary title of armatoliki. Androutsos (referred to as Kapudan (Captain) Disava in Ottoman Archival Documents) explained his position in a letter to the Ottoman government in November 1822, where he presented the Greek revolt not as a national revolution, but as the result of social grievances which could be resolved if he was to be appointed to the right position. In 1822-25 his military campaigns deteriorated and a series of military failures followed: the two sieges of Chalkis and the battle of Agia Marina. Those initiatives had not the appropriate support by the revolutionary government. His energy was consumed by the exigencies of the internal strife among the faction of the Greek administration however he retained his high profile as a warrior and his strong influence among the peasants.

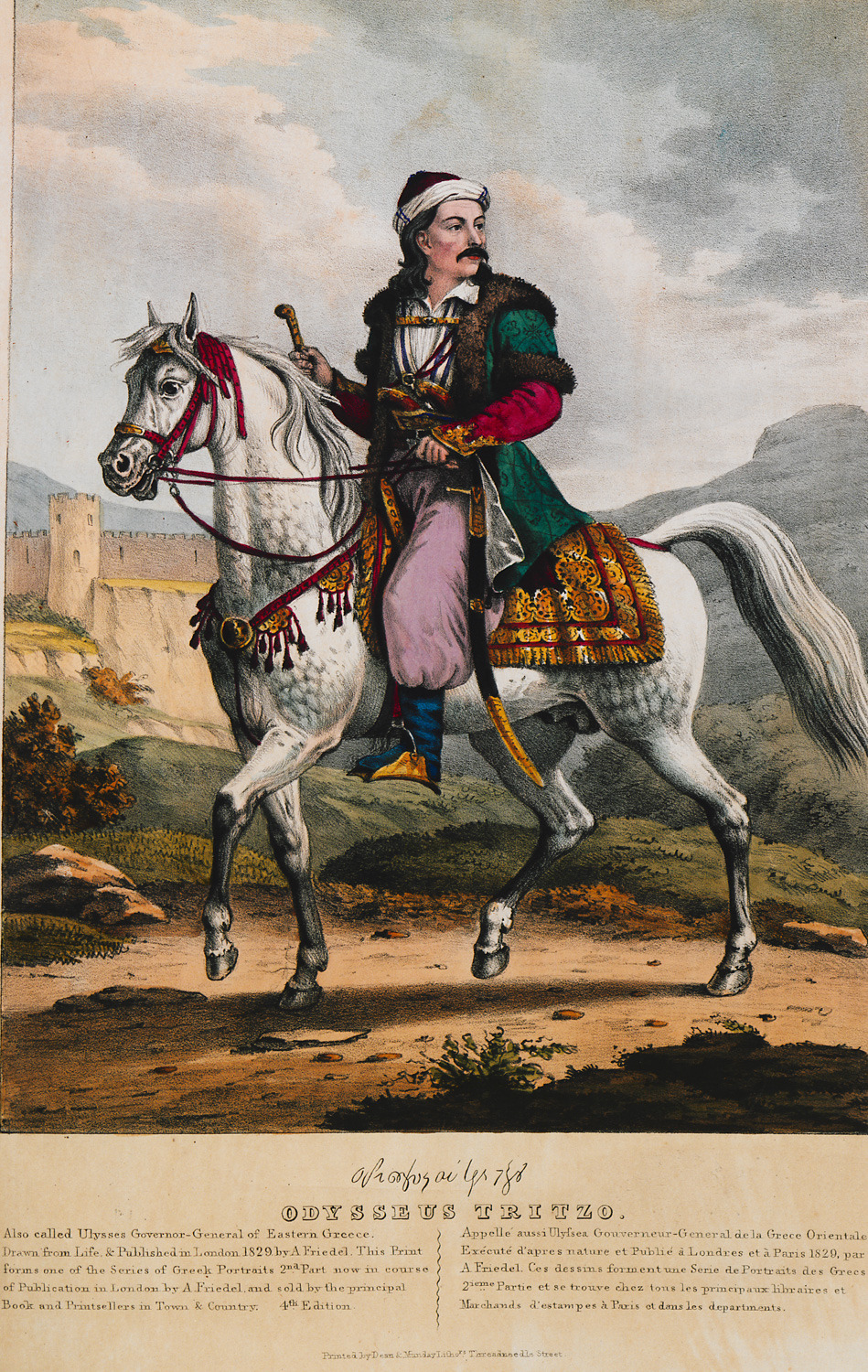
Androutsos as "Governor-General of Eastern Greece" (Odysseus Tritzo, Adam Friedel, 1829).

In his letters to the Greek chieftains and to the kodjabashis of Hydra, however, Androutsos claimed that the agreements made with the Ottomans were a ruse so that the revolutionaries would have time to transfer their people to more secure areas. In a letter to Demetrios Ypsilantis, the president of the Greek Legislative Corps, Androutsos also reports that he attempted to lure the Ottomans under the command of Köse Mehmed Pasha into a trap, to no avail. Eventually, Odysseas Androutsos completely paralyzed Köse Mehmed's operations in Central Greece.

== Downfall ==
In early 1825, as the Greek Government still wanted to take the command and replace him, Androutsos, in anger, began a correspondence with Omer Pasha of Karystos, offering to hand over the Acropolis if aided by Ottoman troops and placed in control of the districts of Livadia, Thebes, and Atalanti. Though the terms of their agreement are not preserved in Ottoman archives, Androutsos was sent a firman granting him amnesty on 31 March. In the following days, the locals from Livadeia, Thebes, and Atalanti asked for amnesty from the court. He joined forces with the Ottoman army to defend the villages around Livadia. After promised reinforcements failed to arrive, he wanted to retreat towards Megara but was captured by Greek insurgents.

The provisional government accused Androutsos of collaboration with the Ottomans and imprisoned him in the Frankish Tower of the Acropolis of Athens. He was not given a trial due to the belief that his democratic character could turn the people against the government.

Once he was imprisoned, Androutsos was tortured and ultimately executed. The execution came at the order of Ioannis Gouras, who was once Androutsos' second in command. His execution took place on 5 June 1825 and was carried out by Ioannis Mamouris and two others. This treatment by Gouras is often viewed negatively. Androutsos' body was thrown from the Acropolis and was buried at its base on the north side.

Androutsos' sister Tarsitsa Kamenou married Edward John Trelawny, who had commanded Androutsos' forces in his absence.

== Posthumous recognition ==
In 1865, his body was recovered from the base of the Acropolis and given a proper funeral at the Metropolitan Cathedral of Athens. He was buried in the First Cemetery of Athens, where he remained for just over a century. On 15 July 1967, his bones were moved to an ossuary beneath a statue of himself in the central square of Preveza.

== Legacy ==
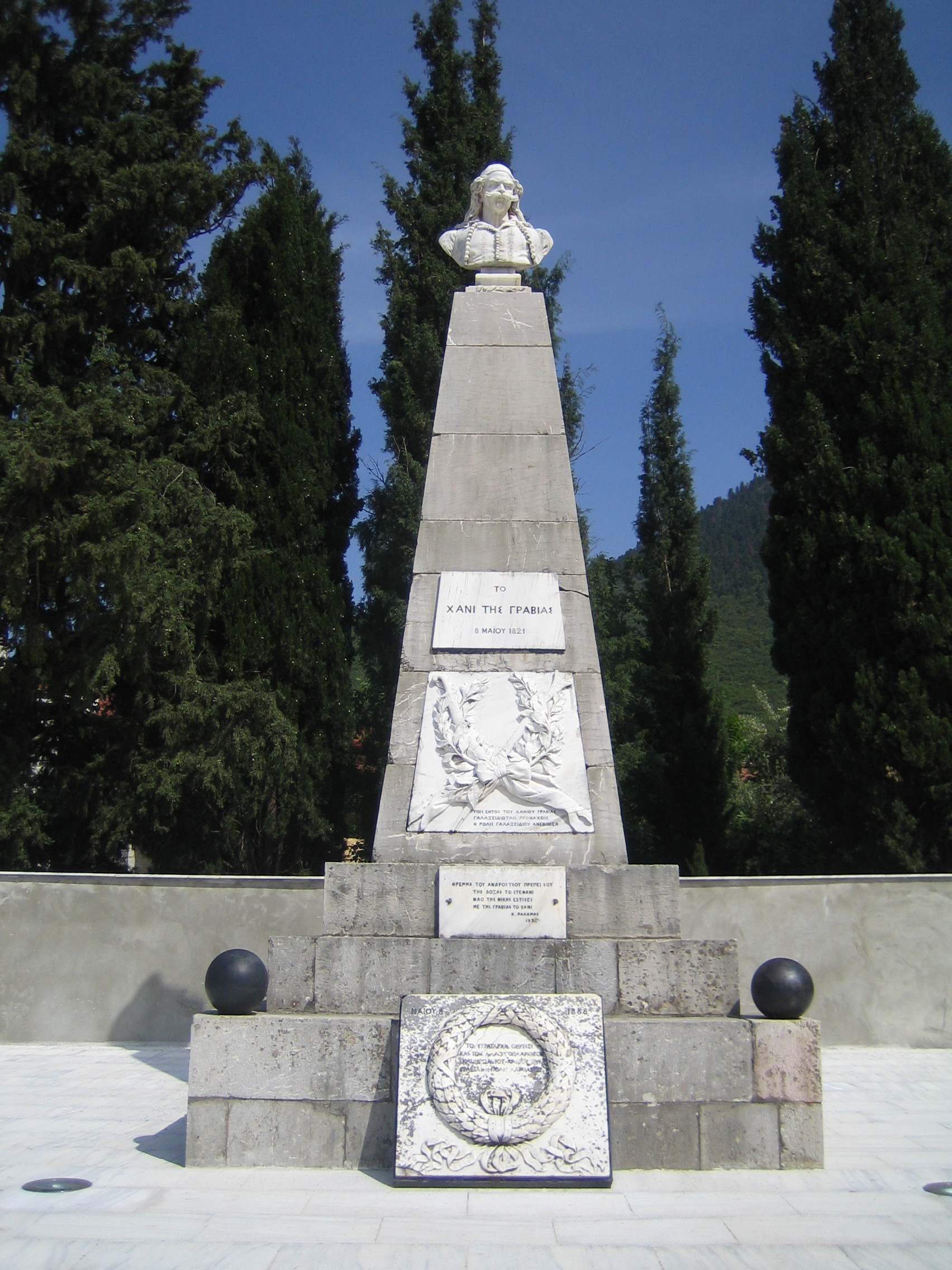
Monument to Androutsos in Gravia.

Popular tradition in Greece considers him a tragic hero. According to some scholars, Androutsos is listed among the main Greek military figures and heroes of the Greek war of Independence. According to others, he was a traitor to the Greek cause.

Among those who lived in the same period, Edward Trelawny who was married to his half-sister presents him as a noble figure, while Thomas Gordon calls him a "physically imposing man" who was "bloodthirsty, vindictive and as treacherous as an Arnaut" and "guilty of barbarious acts". Roessel says that through his connection with Trelawny, the traitor Androutsos became in England a hero of the Greek War of Independence. According to Thanos M. Veremis, Androutsos was among those Greek freedom fighters who became heroes in a West lacking its own similar heroes at the time. G. Finlay files him in his index as "Odysseus, a partisan of Ali's" providing for his character the description: "his ambition was to ape the tyranny of Ali in a small sphere". Finlay called Androutsos' agreement with the Ottomans "the most celebrated instance of treachery among the Greeks during their Revolution".

Many klephts, such as Androutsos, fought only when it suited them. As a matter of policy, they also made temporary agreements with the enemy. According to Alexander Elliot, they did not see that as treason to the infant Greek nation, because the notion of nationhood itself was foreign to them. Vasileios Sfyroeras argues that long-lasting negotiations with the Ottomans, which were conducted by Androutsos and many other chieftains during the revolution, had benefited the Greek cause multiple times and were often arranged for tactical reasons. In his view, such negotiations were providing the revolutionaries enough time to save Christian populations from plunder and murder by the Ottoman armies, rally troops and, later, fight and defeat their enemies in numerous engagements.

Apart from his military nature, Androutsos also corresponded with representatives of the modern Greek Enlightenment such as Adamantios Korais and Neophytos Vamvas, whom he invited in 1823 to come to Athens in order to "teach the children of the Greeks the virtue, the patriotism, and the wisdom of our ancestors." Androutsos also founded a number of schools (1824–1825), started a charitable society and preserved Greek antiquities. His style generally displayed that of the noble brigrand. According to Bruce Merry, in his speeches and letters Androutsos expressed extraordinary patriotic feelings for the Greek national cause. According to William St Clair, Androutsos' higher ambition was only to be a local chieftain and he certainly did not care for any concept of Greece, or regeneration, or the typical Greek and Philhellenic myths. As such St Clair states that Androutsos was a typical Greek of his time but his perspective was inconsistent to many Philhellenes who were struggling to comprehend the Greek political scene. For them Androutsos had to be inserted into some philhellenic ideal because to them he was a "true Greek", who dwelled in the mountains and was a "colourful" and "powerful" figure with a prominent Greek-sounding name. Stanhope even viewed Androutsos as the hope of restoring a constitutional republic in Greece, which is probably the most misconstrued of all views of Androutsos' character.

Androutsos has been held up as a symbol of innate Greek values and freedom, in particular by the Greek left wing in times of political repression.

=== Arts ===
Poems dedicated to Androutsos have been written by various Greek poets: Georgios Zalokostas, Spyros Zampelios, Parashos, Kostis Palamas, Georgios Stratigis and Zacharias Papantoniou. In Nikos Engonopoulos Bolivar, a Greek poem (1944) Androutsos is the main protagonist together with southern-Central American revolutionary, Simón Bolívar.

Odysseas Androutsos (1928) by Dimitris Kaminakis became the first Greek movie dedicated to events of the Greek War of Independence.

=== Sports ===
The soccer team of the town of Gravia, Odysseas Androutsos F.C. is named after him, as is the cultural association of his ancestral village of Livanates.

== See also ==
- Battle of Gravia Inn

== Sources ==
- Merry, Bruce (30 May 2004). Encyclopedia of Modern Greek Literature. Greenwood Publishing Group. p. 230. ISBN 978-0-313-30813-0.
- Ilıcak, Şükrü, ed. (2021). Those Infidel Greeks: The Greek War of Independence through Ottoman Archival Documents. Brill. doi:10.1163/9789004471306. hdl:20.500.12657/50791. ISBN 978-90-04-47129-0.
- Isabella, Maurizio (2023). Southern Europe in the Age of Revolutions. Princeton University Press. ISBN 9780691246192.
- Karasarinis, Markos (2021). "Rumeli". In Paschalis M. Kitromilides, Constantinos Tsoukalas (ed.). The Greek Revolution: A Critical Dictionary. Harvard University Press. pp. 297–314. ISBN 978-0674259317.
- Magliveras, Simeon (2009). The ontology of difference: nationalism, localism and ethnicity in a Greek Arvanite village (PDF) (PhD). Durham University. p. 55.
- Mazower, Mark (4 November 2021). The Greek Revolution: 1821 and the Making of Modern Europe. Penguin Books Limited. ISBN 978-0-14-197875-8.
- Papastamatiou, Dimitrios (2021). "Military Leaders". In Paschalis M. Kitromilides, Constantinos Tsoukalas (ed.). The Greek Revolution: A Critical Dictionary. Harvard University Press. pp. 399–419. ISBN 978-0674259317.
- Stabakis, Nikos (2010). Surrealism in Greece: An Anthology. Surrealist Revolution Series. University of Texas Press. ISBN 9780292773424.
- Ricks, David (2022). "The Shot Heard Round the World: The Greek Revolution's Legacy in Poetry". In Yianni Cartledge, Andrekos Varnava (ed.). New Perspectives on the Greek War of Independence: Myths, Realities, Legacies and Reflections. Springer Nature. pp. 297–390. ISBN 9783031108495.
- Schuberth, Richard (2021). Lord Byrons letzte Fahrt: Eine Geschichte des Griechischen Unabhängigkeitskrieges. Göttingen: Wallstein Verlag. ISBN 9783835345959.
- Skiotis, Dennis (1976). "The Greek Revolution: Ali Pasha's Last Gamble" (PDF). Hellenism and the First Greek War of Liberation (1821–1830): Continuity and Change. University of York, Faculty of Liberal Arts & Professional Studies: 97–109. Archived from the original (PDF) on 17 November 2015.
- Στάθης, Παναγιώτης (2003). "Ο Οδυσσέας Ανδρούτσος πριν από τον ξεσηκωμό". Ιστορικά: Οδυσσέας Ανδρούτσος (188). Eleftherotypia: 6–16.
- Stergellis, Aristeidis (2013). "New Archival Information about Odysseus Androutsos' Drama" (PDF). Neoellinika Istorika.
- Suparaku, Sokol (2013). Albanità in Ebollizione. Studio delle dinamiche dell'identità e delle rappresentazioni sociali degli Albanesi nella transizione tra epoca moderna e postmoderna (PhD). Università Ca' Foscari Venezia.
- Vranousis, L.; Sfyroeras, V. (1997). "The Culmination of Cultural Activity in Epirus". Epirus, 4000 Years of Greek History and Civilization. Ekdotike Athenon: 266–269. ISBN 9789602133712.
