= Nakos Panourgias =

Greek military commander (c. 1795 – c. 1863)

- Νάκος Πανουργιάς
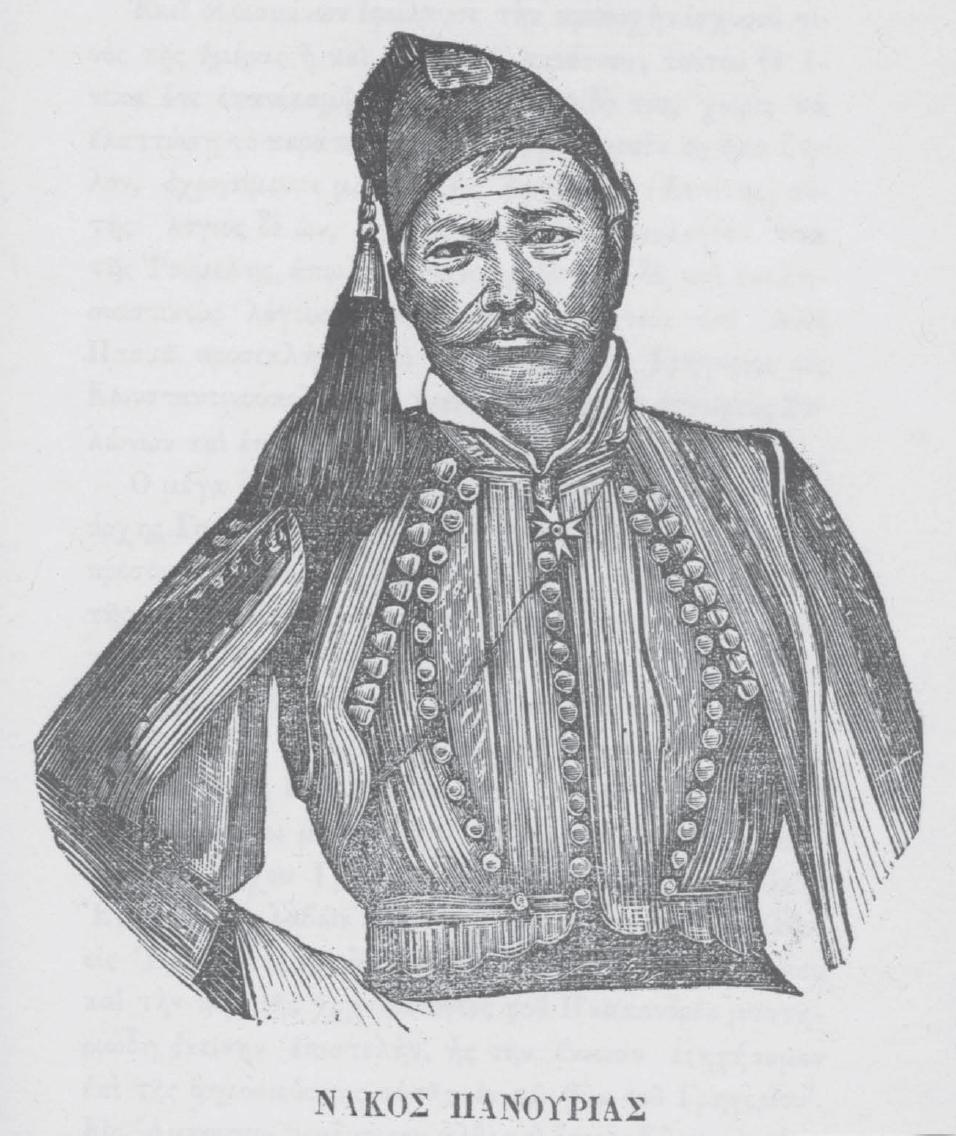
- Woodcut of Nakos Panourgias as a general in the dress of the Royal Phalanx.
- Born: Ioannis Panourgias (Ιωάννης Πανουργιάς) c. 1795; Salona, Eyalet of the Archipelago, Ottoman Empire (now Amfissa, Greece)
- Died: c. 1863; Amfissa, Kingdom of Greece
- Relatives: Dimitrios Panourgias (father); Yiannis Gouras (uncle)
- Military career
- Allegiance: First Hellenic Republic; Kingdom of Greece
- Branch: Hellenic Army
- Rank: Major General
- Conflicts: Greek War of Independence: Battle of Vasilika; Civil Wars; Battle of Arachova; Battle of Petra
- Other work: MP for Amfissa

Nakos Panourgias (Greek: Νάκος Πανουργιάς) was a Greek commander during the Greek War of Independence, who rose to the rank of major general and was elected an MP in the independent Kingdom of Greece.

== Life ==
Nakos Panourgias was born in Salona in 1795, as the son of the prominent armatolos chieftain Dimitrios Panourgias. He became a warrior like his father, and distinguished himself for his bravery during the Greek War of Independence, fighting both under his father and under other chieftains. Governor Ioannis Kapodistrias named him a chiliarch in 1827.

After independence, King Otto of Greece promoted him to major general, and he was elected as a member of the Hellenic Parliament for his native Amfissa from 1844 on.

He died at Amfissa in 1863.
