= Royal Phalanx =

Veteran military body of the Kingdom of Greece

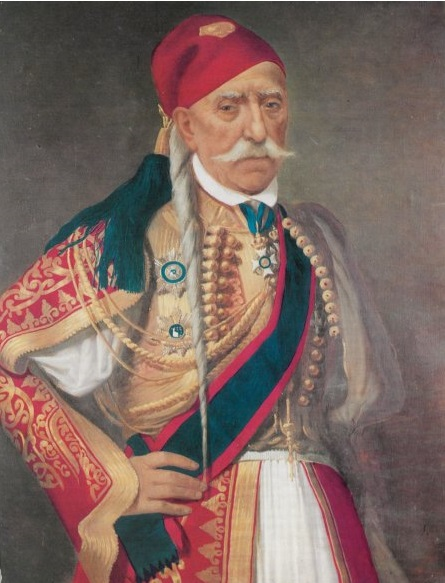
Dimitrios Plapoutas, commander of the 12th Tetrarchy of the Phalanx, in the traditional dress worn by the Phalanx members

The Royal Phalanx (Greek: Βασιλική Φάλαγξ) was a military body composed of veteran officers of the Greek War of Independence, established on 18 September 1835. The Phalanx entailed military garrison duties, but mostly it was an honorific appointment, and a means to sustain veteran soldiers who had no other means of upkeep.

== Background ==
The end of the Greek War of Independence (1821–29) had bequeathed several problems to the nascent Kingdom of Greece, among them the organization of a new and reliable regular army following the collapse of the first such attempts after the murder of Governor Ioannis Kapodistrias in 1831 and the period of political anarchy and infighting that followed. This process began with the arrival of the Bavarian King Otto, accompanied by Bavarian troops, in 1833. The new regime abolished the irregular forces that had been left over from the War of Independence, and organized a new military, with mixed Greek and Bavarian command staff.

== Establishment of the Phalanx ==
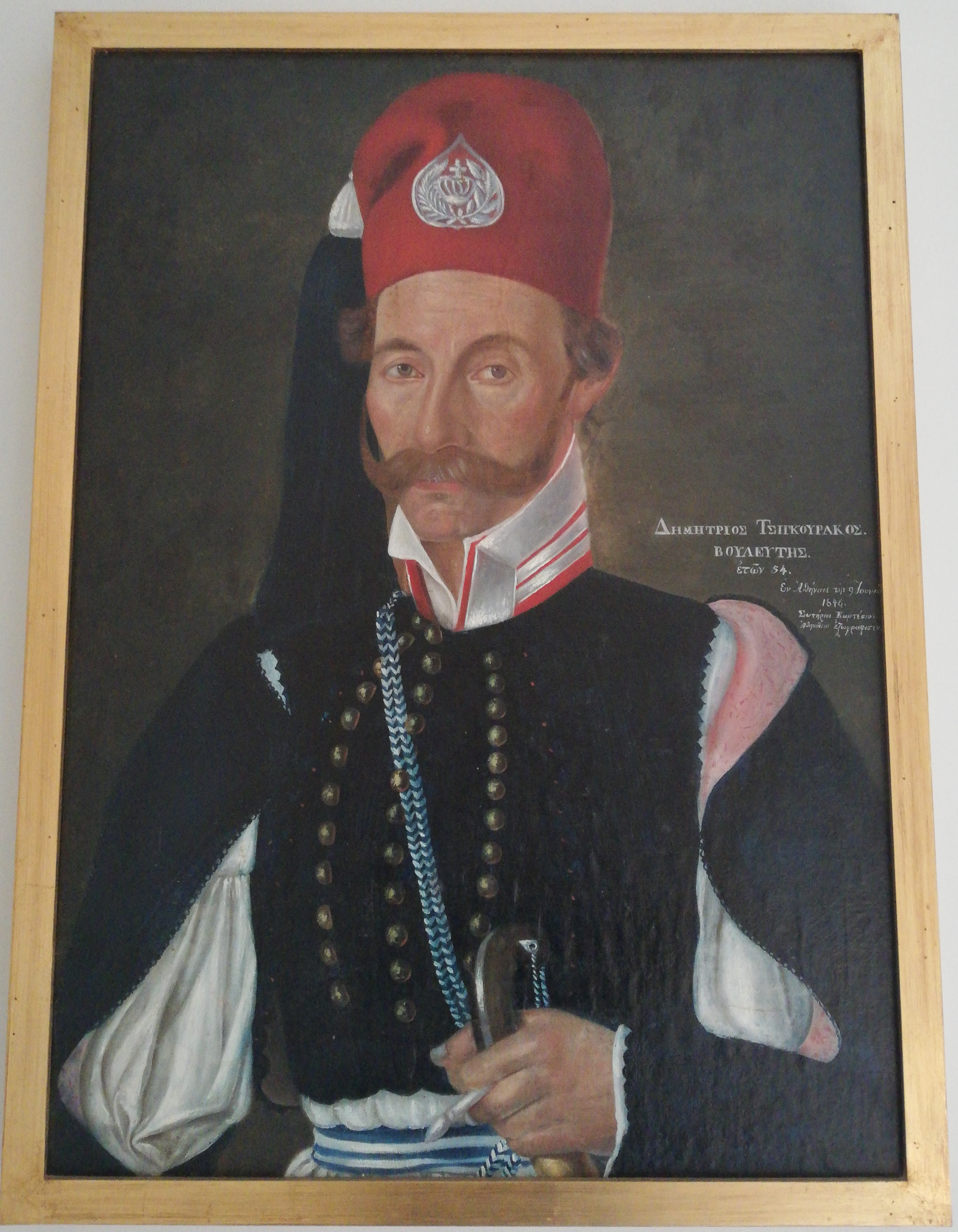
The soldier and MP Dimitrios Tsingourakos Grigorakis in 1846, as a lieutenant of the Phalanx, wearing the rank insignia of a lieutenant colonel and the distinctive emblem of the Phalanx on his fez

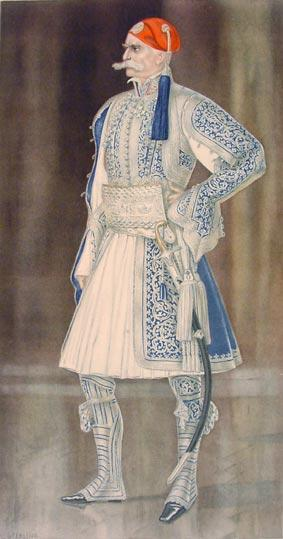
A general in Phalanx dress, 1835

Another major problem was the fate of the many warriors who had taken part in the War of Independence but had been left out of the new army; knowing no other trade and faced with poverty, they were a potentially unstable element, as had been demonstrated in the uprisings and civil wars of previous years. As an attempt to solve this problem, on 18 September and 11 October 1835 two Royal Decrees were promulgated founding the "Royal Phalanx" to be recruited among deserved veterans of the War of Independence. The decrees stressed the honorific nature of the Phalanx, pointing out that the new corps would precede all other military formations on parade and accompany the king. For the same reason, all members of the Phalanx were automatically awarded the Silver Cross of the War of Independence, which entailed certain privileges such as the right to bear arms, the exemption from corvee labour, or the right of precedence in public ceremonies. Further privileges included the right to serve near their place of residence, and the right to be eligible, despite their salaried position, for the distribution of public lands intended for destitute fighters of the War of Independence. Finally, the uniform of the new corps was decreed as the traditional Greek foustanella dress that its members had worn during the War of Independence, instead of the unpopular "tight" Western European-style uniforms of the regular army. The only additions were a standing collar with the Bavarian-style rank insignia of the regular army, and a special emblem on the fez, consisting of a gold or silver-embroidered, heart-shaped wreath surrounding a royal crown.

The decrees provided that only veteran officers of impeccable conduct—in view of the turmoils of the previous years which had convulsed all of Greek society, in practice this meant loyalty to the Bavarian regime—and who could certify their status as veterans were eligible. Many veterans' claims had already been checked by a commission established in March 1833, but another, extraordinary, commission, composed of Richard Church, Nikitas Stamatelopoulos, Dionysios Evmorfopoulos, Ioannis Makriyannis, Nikolaos Krieziotis, and Kitsos Tzavellas, was set up to examine the claims specifically for admission to the Phalanx. In an attempt to ensure its impartiality, the new commission was formed from among the various dominant political factions—the French, English, and Russian parties—as well as the various regions of provenance of veterans, including the Souliotes and fighters from Ionian Islands, which were outside the boundaries of the Greek kingdom. Nevertheless, it is documented that the selection process was often abused: parliamentary debates from 1866 refer to people "who were not even born during the Revolution, or stableboys and cooks" as having gained admittance to the corps.

According to the Decree of 11 October 1835, the Phalanx was to be divided into tetrarchies (τετραρχίαι, sing. τετραρχία), each commanded by a captain as commander or tetrarch (τετράρχης), one lieutenant, two sub-lieutenants, one ensign, four master sergeants, 54 corporals and ordinary phalangites, and one trumpeter. The ranks in the Phalanx corresponded to higher officer ranks in the Army, with a captain corresponding to colonel with a monthly pay of 250 to 300 drachmas, a lieutenant (180 drachmas) corresponding to lieutenant colonel, a sub-lieutenant (140 drachmas) to major, an ensign or master sergeant (90 drachmas) to captain, a corporal (60 drachmas) to lieutenant, and an ordinary phalangite (48 drachmas) to sub-lieutenant. The poorer lower ranks also had the right to additional free flour and free lodgings for their use when serving away from their garrison, as well as free healthcare.

Following some delays, in early 1836 eleven provisional tetrarchies were established, but the first formal organization of the Phalanx came with the publication of an Army Order on 25 April 1836, whereby 800 veterans were assigned to 13 tetrarchies. These were:

Tetrarchy	Garrison	Commander
1st	Lamia	Nakos Panourgias
2nd	Vonitsa	Georgios Tsongas
3rd	Nafplion	Giannakis Staikos
4th	Areopolis	Georgios Kitsos
5th	Missolonghi	Dimitrios Makris
6th	Nafpaktos	Diamantis Zervas
7th	Thebes	Dionysios Evmorfopoulos
8th	Athens	Ioannis Makriyannis
9th	Corinth	Gennaios Kolokotronis
10th	Patras	Vasileios Petmezas
11th	Sparti	Panagiotis Giatrakos
12th	Arcadia	Dimitrios Plapoutas
13th	Chalcis	Nikolaos Kriezotis

The organization and membership of the Phalanx and the tetrarchies was very fluid, reflecting the role of the corps as an honorary appointment rather than an actual military unit, and underwent many changes and modifications during its existence. For instance, on 1 April 1837 three new tetrarchies of modified composition (80 corporals and phalangites with 16 officers) were established for veterans who could lay no claim to public land. The composition and roles assigned to each of them shows how much the institution of the Phalanx reflected ad hoc priorities and needs: The first new tetrarchy, under Colonel Giatrakos, was composed of the younger veterans, and doubled as a transit unit for the other tetrarchies. The second, under Nikolaos Tzavellas, was composed of Souliotes and other Epirotes as well as Aetoloacarnanians, and tasked with garrisoning Nafpaktos. The third tetrarchy contained veterans of advanced age, who were not called upon for active service.

The Royal Phalanx survived until c. 1873.

== "Endowed Phalanx" ==
The cost of the Phalanx, with the extensive privileges it afforded to its members, quickly became a major burden on the budget of the cash-strapped Greek state. By 1838, it comprised over 900 members, whose upkeep required over one million drachmas annually. In an attempt to reduce this exorbitant expenditure, on 1 January 1838, a new law proposed the award of land to members of the Phalanx with no other sources of income, provided that they renounced their previous salary. If they agreed, the members of the Phalanx were to receive a year's salary as capital and a promissory note for a value of public land, to be purchased at public auctions. The value of the land given was graded according to the salary, e.g. ordinary phalangites who received a pay of 48 drachmas were entitled to land worth 2,880 drachmas, those with a salary of 90 drachmas land worth 5,440 drachmas, and those with a salary of 140 drachmas and above land worth 8,400 drachmas, with the difference paid as salary. The lands thus acquired would be inalienable for three years without prior royal approval, but could be mortgaged. The members of this "Endowed Phalanx" (προικοδοτημένη φάλαγξ) maintained their privileges of rank and uniform, and were further eligible for appointments to the National Guard, while those who remained in the ordinary Phalanx faced curtailment of the privileges and pay, although it was possible to be transferred to the status of seniors (πρεσβύτες), which was reserved for particularly distinguished officers of the War of Independence "in need of special assistance".

Many phalangites made use of this provision, and from 1838 until 1843, promissory notes to the value of 5,493,639 drachmas were issued, with the membership of the Phalanx declining during this time to around 400. However, as most of the phalangites lacked the funds to adequately establish themselves as farmers, usually these notes were not used for the purchase of land, but immediately resold at a fraction (usually 25%–30%) of their value, with the result that the veterans remained destitute, and public land was acquired by profiteers. As a result, the "Endowed Phalanx" proved a failure, and many of the veterans who joined it were left with no choice than to petition—in most cases successfully—to be readmitted to the Royal Phalanx.

== Sources ==
- Malesis, Dimitris (1993). Ο Ελληνικός Στρατός στην πρώτη Οθωνική δεκαετία (1833–1843). Πολιτική οργάνωση και πελατειακές σχέσεις [The Greek Army in the First Othonian Decade (1833–1843). Political Organization and Clientelistic Relations] (Ph.D. thesis). Panteion University. doi:10.12681/eadd/3258. hdl:10442/hedi/3258.
- Mylonas, Yiannis (1998). Οι Εύζωνοι [The Evzones] (in Greek). Athens: Ioannis Floros. ISBN 960-7178-39-4.
