= Yannis Gouras =

Greek soldier (1771–1826)

Yiannis Gouras
- Γιάννης Γκούρας
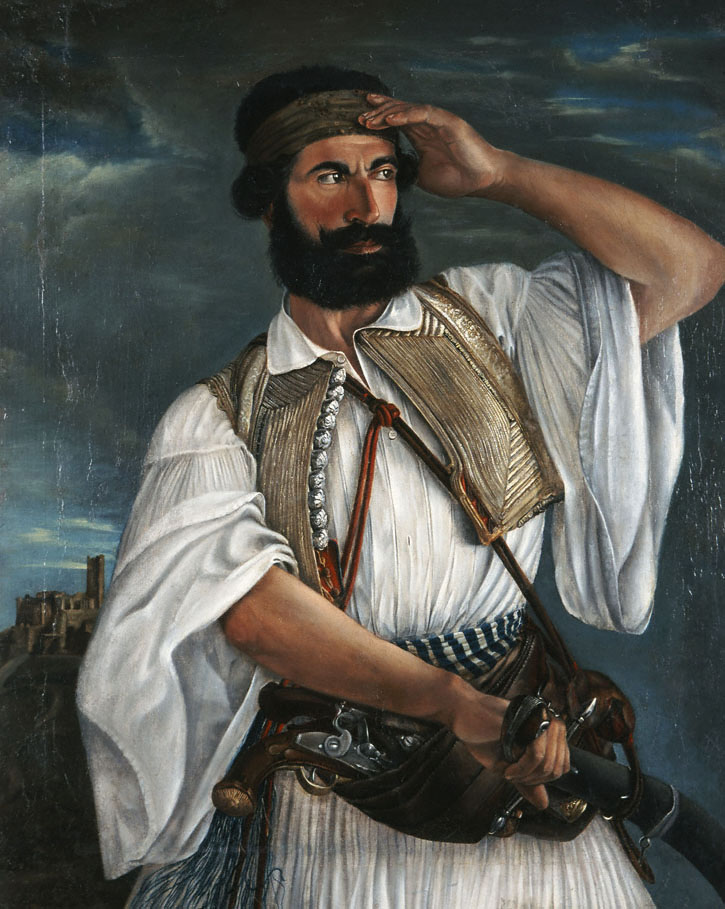
- A portrait of Gouras by Filippos Margaritis
- Born: Ioannis Gouras; Ιωάννης Γκούρας; 1771; Dremissa, Eyalet of the Archipelago, Ottoman Empire (now Greece)
- Died: 1 October 1826 (aged 54–55); Athens, First Hellenic Republic
- Burial place: Holy Monastery of Faneromeni, Salamis
- Spouse: Asimo Lidoriki
- Relatives: Dimitrios Panourgias (cousin); Nakos Panourgias (nephew)
- Military career
- Allegiance: (Greece) First Hellenic Republic
- Branch: Hellenic Army
- Conflicts: Greek War of Independence; Battle of Gravia Inn; Battle of Vasilika; Greek Civil Wars; Second Siege of the Acropolis †

Yiannis Gouras (Greek: Γιάννης Γκούρας; 1771–1826) was a Greek military leader during the Greek War of Independence.

Gouras was an Arvanite. A cousin of Panourgias, he distinguished himself in the battles in eastern Continental Greece, but became notorious for his invasion of the Peloponnese during the Greek civil wars of 1823–25 and his murder of his former chief, Odysseas Androutsos.

He was killed during the Second Siege of the Acropolis.

He was buried in a monastery in Salamis.

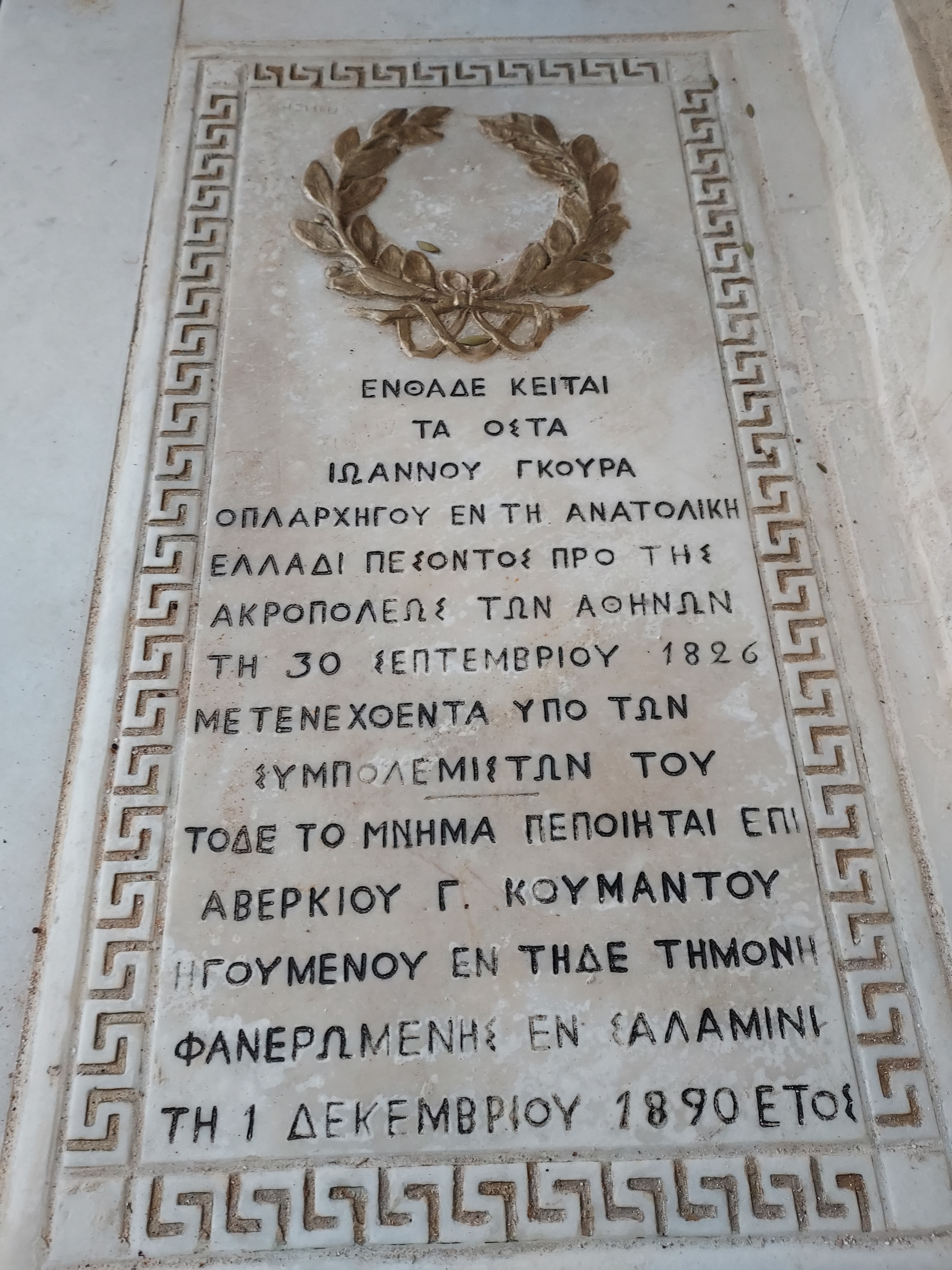
The grave of Yiannis Gouras.
