= Battle of Vasilika =

Battle during the Greek War of Independence

- Part of the Greek War of Independence
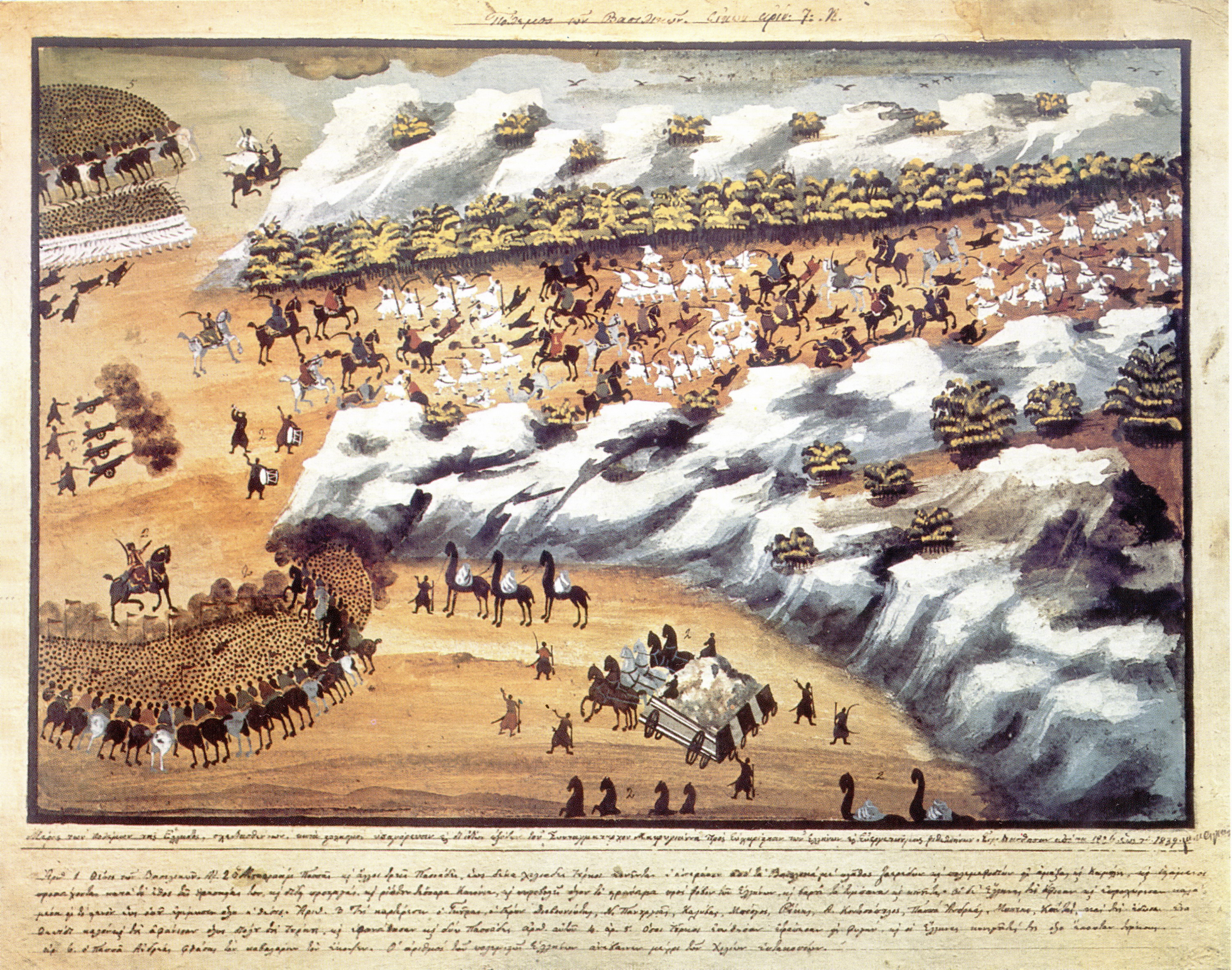
- The Battle of Vasilika, by Panagiotis Zographos
Date	7 September 1821 (26 August O.S.)
Location	Vasilika, Sanjak of Eğriboz, Ottoman Empire (now Phthiotis, Greece) 38.708°N 22.754°E
Result	Greek victory

Belligerents
Greek revolutionaries	Ottoman Empire

Commanders and leaders
Ioannis Gouras; Dimitrios Panourgias; Ioannis Dyovouniotis; Odysseas Androutsos	Behram Pasha

Strength
1,600–2,300	5,000–8,000

Casualties and losses
Unknown	700 dead, 1 officer dead, 800 horses, 18 flags, 7 cannons

The Battle of Vasilika was fought between Greek revolutionaries and the Ottoman Empire during the Greek War of Independence.

== Battle ==
After the battle of Alamana, the route to Eastern Central Greece and Morea was clear for the Ottoman armies. During August 1821, an Ottoman force of 5,000-8,000 men under the command of Behram Pasha campaigned south to quell the Greek revolution and lift the siege of Tripolitsa. To intercept this expedition, the revolutionaries under the command of Yannis Gouras and Ioannis Dyovouniotis assembled in the desolate village of Vasilika of Phthiotis, where the road led to a long and narrow path.

On 7 September 1821, the Turkish forces attempted to continue their march through Vasilika, but they engaged with the revolutionaries and fierce battle ensued. The Greeks, after using their firearms, they assaulted the Ottomans since they had heard a rumor that Odysseas Androutsos, a prominent military captain of Eastern Central Greece, was approaching the battlefield to reinforce them. The Ottomans suffered heavy casualties, and eventually they retreated to Lamia, leaving many of their war supplies and seven cannons behind. They also knocked down the bridge of Alamana to prevent the Greeks from pursuing them.

The battle of Vasilika was a significant victory for the revolutionaries since Behram Pasha’s large army were successfully repulsed. Furthermore, the Sublime Porte was unable to organize another campaign until 1822, thus the Greeks gained the opportunity to regroup. This victory prevented the Ottoman army in central Greece from entering the Peloponnese and relieving the Ottoman garrisons besieged by the Greeks.
