= Klepht =

Greek anti-Ottoman highwayman and insurgent

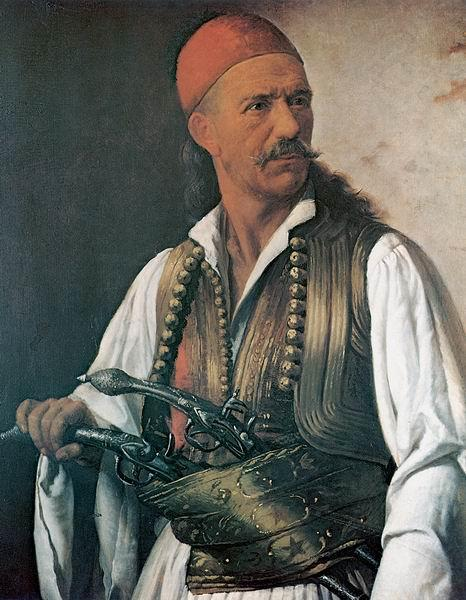
Dimitrios Makris, a Greek klepht chief of the 19th century.

Klephts (/klɛfts/; Greek κλέφτης, kléftis, pl. κλέφτες, kléftes, which means "thieves" and perhaps originally meant just "brigand") were highwaymen turned self-appointed armatoloi, anti-Ottoman insurgents, and warlike mountain-folk who lived in the countryside when Greece was a part of the Ottoman Empire. They were the descendants of Greeks who retreated into the mountains during the 15th century in order to avoid Ottoman rule. Klepht bands also included many ethnic Albanians. They carried on a continuous war against Ottoman rule and remained active as brigands until the 19th century.

The terms kleptomania and kleptocracy are derived from the same Greek root, κλέπτειν (kléptein), "to steal".

== Origins ==
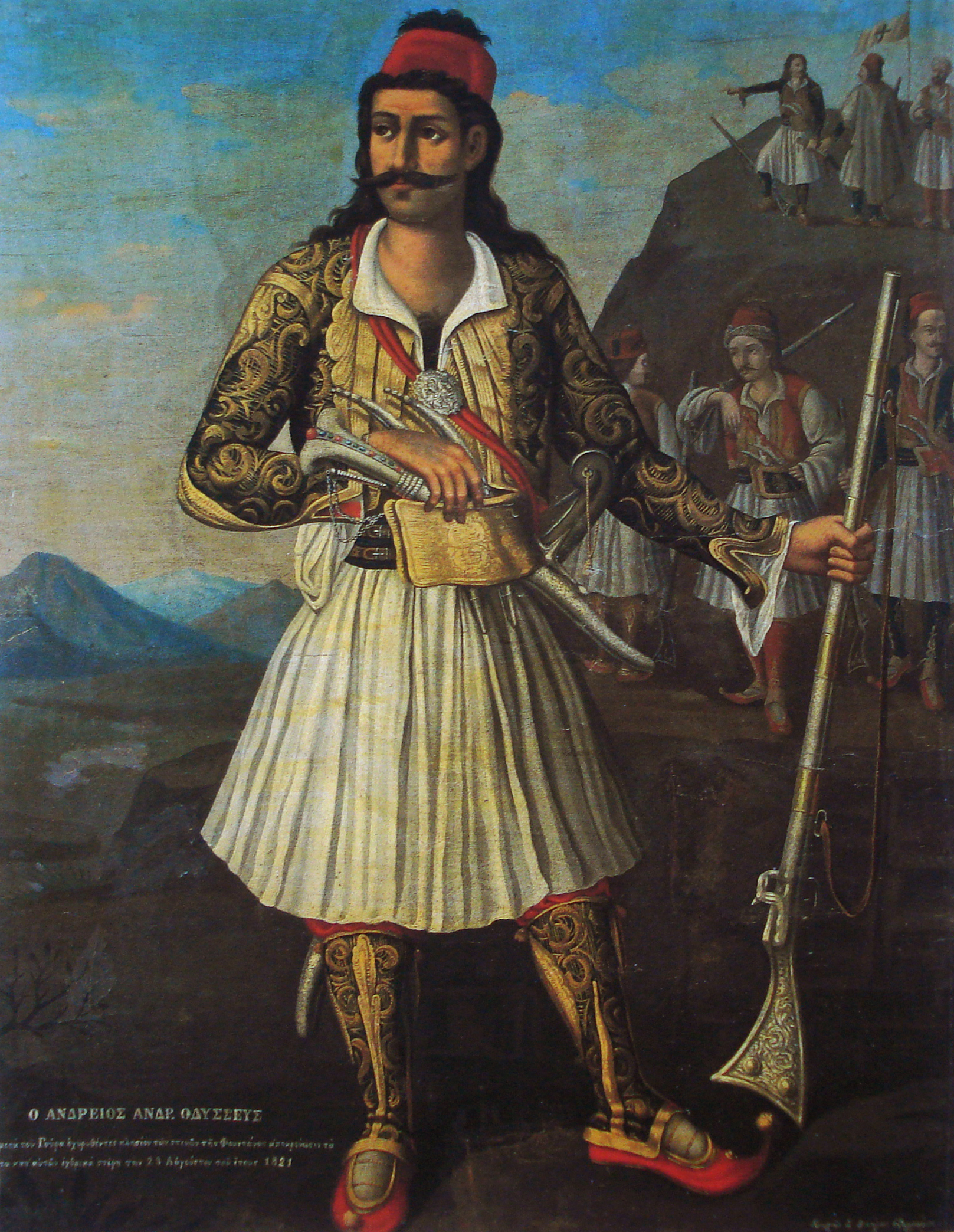
Portrait of Odysseas Androutsos by Kozis Desyllas

After the Fall of Constantinople in 1453 and then the fall of Mistra in the Despotate of the Morea, most of the plains of present-day Greece fell entirely into the hands of the Ottoman Empire. The only territories that did not fall under Ottoman rule were the mountain ranges (populated by Greeks and inaccessible to the Ottoman Turks), as well as a handful of islands and coastal possessions under the control of Venice. This situation lasted until 1821. However, later acquired territories of Greece – including Macedonia, Western Thrace and Epirus – were in Turkish hands until the 20th century. This period of time in Greece is known as the Turkocracy.

Ottoman lands were divided up into pashaliks, also called eyalets; in the case of the lands that form present-day Greece, these were Morea and Roumelia. Pashaliks were further sub-divided into sanjaks which were often divided into feudal chifliks (Turkish çiftlik (farm), Greek τσιφλίκι tsifliki). Any surviving Greek troops, whether regular Byzantine forces, local militia, or mercenaries had either to join the Ottoman army as janissaries, serve in the private army of a local Ottoman notable, or fend for themselves. Many Greeks wishing to preserve their Greek identity, Orthodox Christian religion, and independence chose the difficult but liberated life of a bandit. These bandit groups soon found their ranks swelled with impoverished and/or adventurous peasants, societal outcasts, and escaped criminals.

Klephts under Ottoman rule were generally men who were fleeing vendettas or taxes, debts and reprisals from Ottoman officials. They raided travelers and isolated settlements and lived in the rugged mountains and back country. Most klephtic bands participated in some form in the Greek War of Independence. During the Greek War of Independence, the klephts, along with the armatoloi, formed the nucleus of the Greek fighting forces, and played a prominent part throughout its duration. Despite being ineffective, they were the only viable military force for the provisional governments of the 1821–1827 period. During that time period, three attempts were made at creating a regular army, and one of the reasons for their failure was the resistance of the klepht and armatoles leaders. Yannis Makriyannis referred to the "klephtes and armatoloi" as the "yeast of liberty". John Koliopoulos studied the klephts in the 19th century, and stated that the principle of kinship and honour seen in Albanian besa could be seen among the klephts after centuries of contact with Albanian irregulars.

Contrary to conventional Greek history, many of the klephts and armatoles participated at the Greek War of Independence according to their own militaristic patron-client terms. They saw the war as an economic and political opportunity to expand their areas of operation. Balkan bandits such as the klephts and armatoles – glorified in nationalist historiography as national heroes – were actually driven by economic interests, were not aware of national projects, made alliances with the Ottomans and robbed Christians as much as Muslims.

== Songs ==
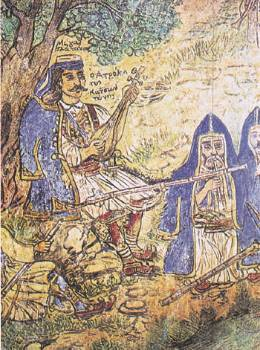
Antonis Katsantonis (Greek klepht) by Theophilos Hatzimihail.

Klephtic songs (κλέφτικα τραγούδια), or ballads, were developed in mainland Greece. They are part of the Greek folk music genre, which includes folk poetry, and are thematically oriented on either the achievements and death of a single klepht or the generic life of the klephts as a group. Klephtic songs are especially popular in Epirus and the Peloponnese. The Czech composer Antonín Dvořák wrote a song-cycle named Three Modern Greek Poems: the first one is entitled "Koljas – Klepht Song" and tells the story of Koljas, the klepht who killed the famous Ali Pasha.

The most famous klephtic and modern Greek folk song is "The Battle of Mount Olympus and Mount Kisavos", a ballad based on a musico-poetic motif dating back to classical Greece (specifically to the poetic song composed by Corinna pertaining to a contest between Mount Helicon and Mount Cithaeron).

== Cuisine ==
The famous Greek dish klephtiko (or kleftiko), a dish entailing slow-cooked lamb (or other meat), can be translated "in the style of the klephts". The klephts, not having flocks of their own, would steal lambs or goats and cook the meat in a sealed pit to avoid the smoke being seen.

== Famous klephts ==
- Antonis Katsantonis
- Giorgakis Olympios
- Odysseas Androutsos
- Athanasios Diakos
- Geórgios Karaïskákis
- Theodoros Kolokotronis
- Dimitrios Makris
- Nikitas Stamatelopoulos

== See also ==
- Hajduk
- Uskok
