= Ioannis Skandalidis =

Greek politician

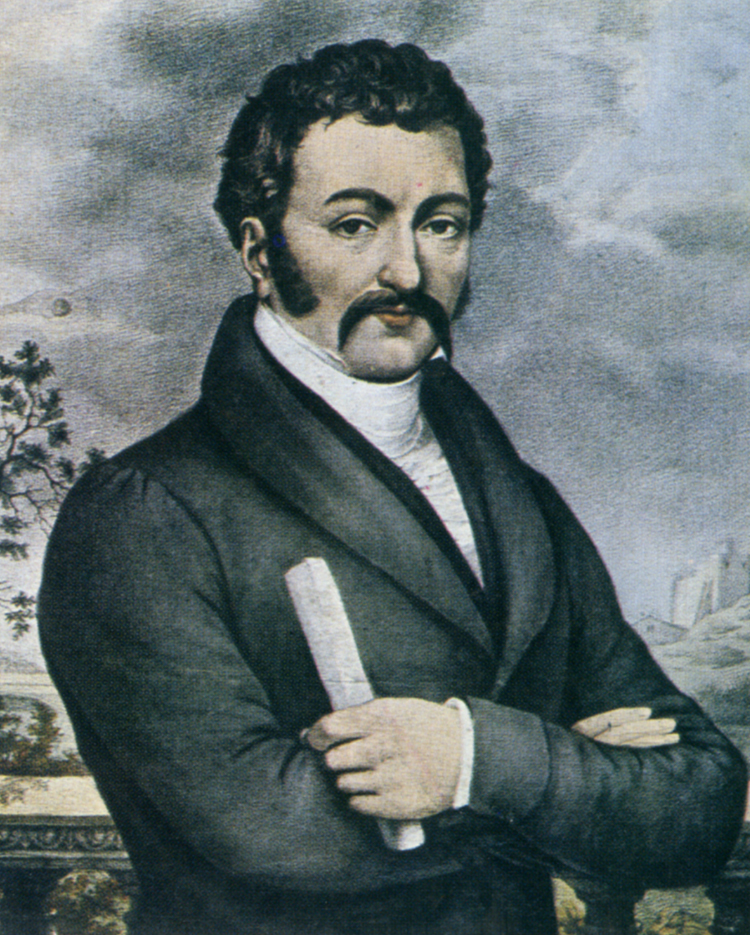
Ioannis Skandalidis in the late 18th or early 19th century

Ioannis Skandalidis (Greek: Ιωάννης Σκανδαλίδης, romanized: Ioánnis Skandalídis) was a Greek politician before and during the Greek War of Independence.

== Life ==
Skandalidis was born c. 1775 in Thessaloniki. He went as a representative of Macedonia to the Areopagus of Eastern Continental Greece, a provisional administrative authority established in Central Greece during the early stages of the revolution, where he used to sign as "Ioannis Skandalidis the Macedonian". He took part at the First National Assembly at Epidaurus as a member and secretary, subsequently becoming secretary of the Legislative Corps set up by the assembly. In 1821 he joined the Vytina Assembly of the supporters of Alexandros Mavrokordatos against the rival Zarakova Assembly of Demetrios Ypsilantis; this division was the herald of the Greek civil wars of 1824–1825.

He died in 1826.

== Sources ==
- Στασινόπουλος Χ., "Λεξικόν της Ελληνικής Επαναστάσεως" [Lexicon of the Greek Revolution], vol. 3, p. 461
