= Battle of Alamana =

1821 battle during the Greek War of Independence

- Part of the Greek War of Independence
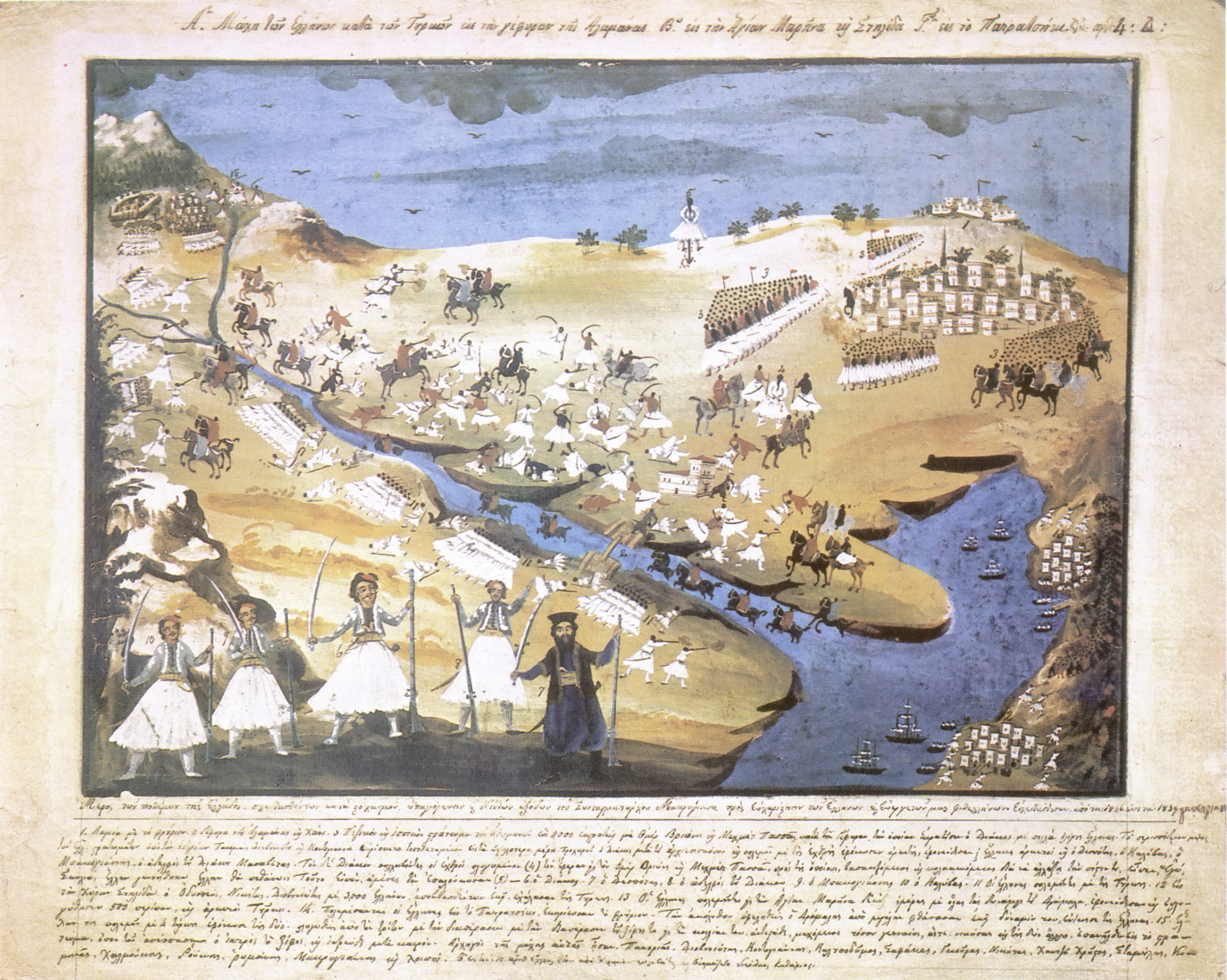
- Battle of Alamana by Panagiotis Zographos under the guidance of Yannis Makriyannis
Date	22 April 1821
Location	Thermopylae, Sanjak of Eğriboz, Ottoman Empire (now Phthiotis, Greece)
Result	Ottoman victory

Belligerents
Greek revolutionaries: Diakos' contingent	Ottoman Empire

Commanders and leaders
Athanasios Diakos (executed); Dimitrios Panourgias; Ioannis Dyovouniotis	(Ottoman Empire) Omer Vrioni

Strength
Unknown	Unknown

Casualties and losses
200	150

The Battle of Alamana was fought between the Greeks and the Ottoman Empire on 22 April 1821, during the Greek War of Independence.

== Battle ==
After the fall of Livadeia on 1 April 1821 to a contingent of Greek fighters under the command of Athanasios Diakos and Vasilis Bousgos, Hursid Pasha sent two of his most competent commanders from Thessaly, Omer Vrioni and Köse Mehmed, at the head of 8,000 men with orders to put down the revolt in Roumeli and then proceed to the Peloponnese and lift the siege at Tripolitsa.

Athanasios Diakos and his band, reinforced by the fighters of Dimitrios Panourgias and Yiannis Dyovouniotis, decided to halt the Ottoman advance into Roumeli by taking defensive positions near Thermopylae. The Greek force of 1,500 men was split into three sections - Dyovouniotis was to defend the bridge at Gorgopotamos, Panourgias the heights of Halkomata, and Diakos the bridge at Alamana.

Setting out from their camp at Lianokladi, near Lamia, the Ottoman Turks soon divided their force. The main force attacked Diakos, the other attacked Dyovouniotis, whose force was quickly routed, and then Panourgias, whose men retreated when he was wounded. The majority of the Greek force having fled, the Ottomans concentrated their attack on Diakos's position at the Alamana bridge. Seeing that it was a matter of time before they were overrun by the enemy, Bousgos, who had been fighting alongside Diakos, pleaded with him to retreat to safety. Diakos chose to stay and fight with 48 men; they put up a desperate hand-to-hand struggle for a number of hours before being overwhelmed. Diakos, wounded in the battle, was captured after his sword broke.

=== Death of Diakos ===
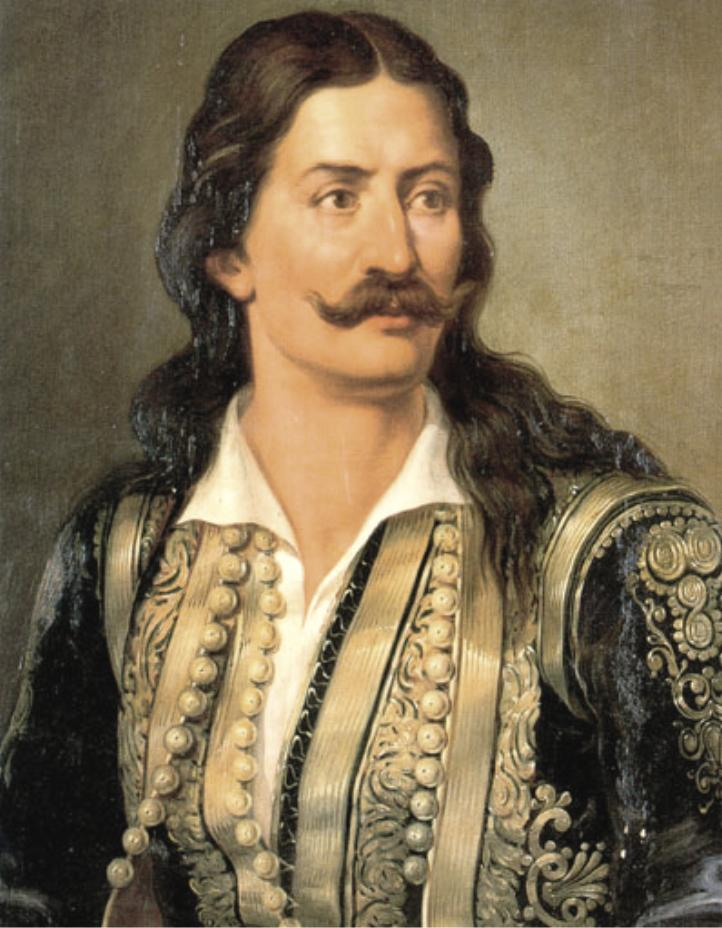
Athanasios Diakos.

Athanasios Diakos was brought before Omer Vrioni, who offered to make him an officer in his army. Diakos immediately refused and replied:

"I was born a Greek and I will die a Greek".

Vrioni then ordered that Diakos be impaled. The Ottomans tried to make Diakos carry the sharpened pole, but he threw it down with contempt. As he was led off to be impaled, it was said that onlookers heard him sing:

"Look at the time Charon chose to take me, now that branches are flowering, now that the earth sends forth grass".

Diakos's song was in reference to the Greeks' uprising against the Ottoman Empire. One popular version mentions that Diakos was also roasted over a fire, however, this is questionable because of another local, oral tradition that has him being killed by a Greek rebel the next day out of mercy, as he was found to be in a near-death state from the impalement.

== Aftermath ==
Even though the battle was ultimately a military defeat for the Greeks, Diakos's death provided the Greek national cause with a stirring myth of heroic martyrdom and enhanced the morale of the Greek uprising against the Ottoman Empire
