= Omer Vrioni =

Ottoman Albanian military commander and ruler

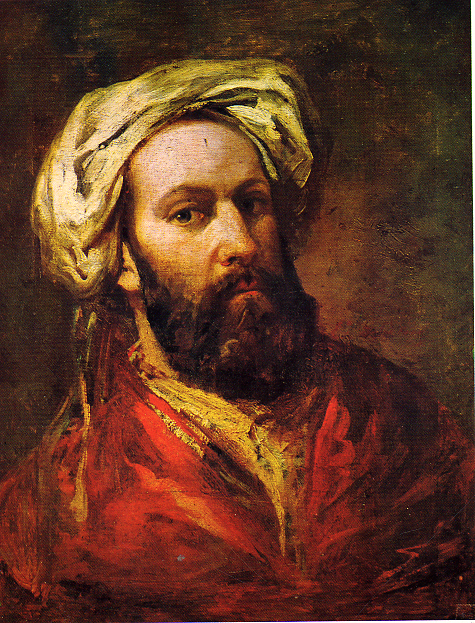
Vizier Omer Pasha Vrioni

Vizier Omer Pasha Vrioni (Albanian: Omer Vrioni, [ˈomeɾ vɾiˈoni]) was an Ottoman Albanian military commander and ruler, and a prominent figure in the Greek War of Independence. He succeeded Ali as Pasha of Yanina.

== Early life ==
Omer Vrioni was a Muslim Tosk Albanian from the village of Vrioni near Berat (hence his surname).

He started his military career as the commander of the forces of the ayan of Elbasan, whose name is not documented. He was sent in Vidin, probably for the Pazvandoğlu revolt and the consequent siege of Vidin in 1797. He was among the Ottoman Albanian troops sent to recover Egypt from a French occupation between 1798 and 1801 under Napoleon, against whom Vrioni was distinguished in battles. In Egypt he served the Ottoman Albanian ruler Muhammad Ali Pasha after his seizure of power, and there he became acquainted with Hurshid Pasha, who also served Muhammad Ali.

== Ali Pasha era ==
Vrioni captured Ibrahim Pasha of Vlorë and Berat, incorporating his domains into Ali Pasha's state in 1810. Until Ali's revolt against the Ottoman Empire, Vrioni was the treasurer (hazinedar) of the Pasha of Yanina. When Ali Pasha of Yanina revolted against the Sublime Porte, Vrioni initially commanded the army tasked with defending the eastern approaches to Ioannina, but in September 1820 he defected to the Porte entering into an agreement with Ismail Pasha, the then commander-in-chief of the Sultan's forces, disbanding his army in exchange for the former Pashalik of Berat (Sanjak of Vlorë). In January 1821 he was appointed sanjak-bey of Vlorë.

== Greek Revolution era ==
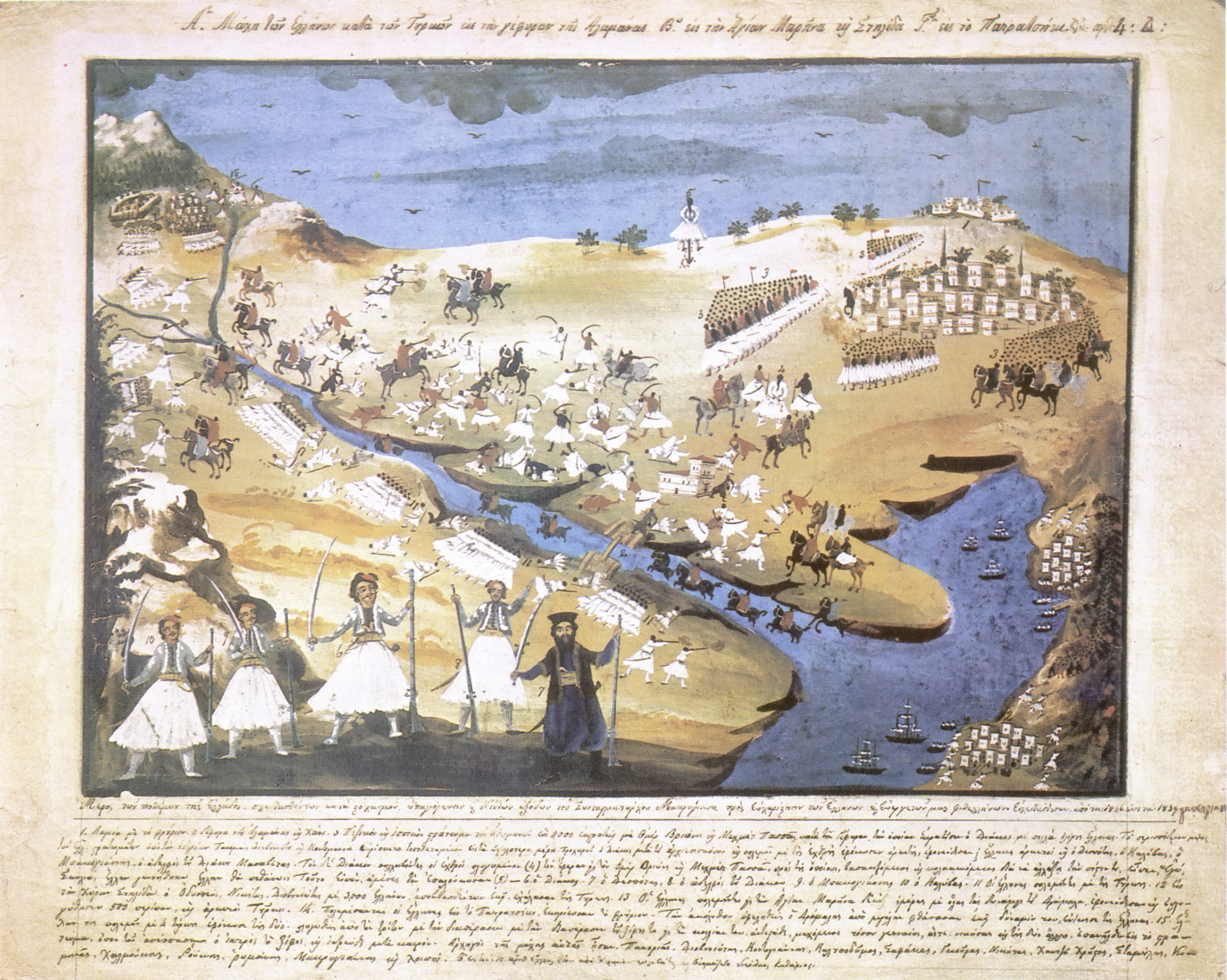
Battle of Alamana, Painting by Panagiotis Zographos, under the guidance of Yannis Makriyannis: 1) Lamia; 2) Bridge and khan of Alamana; 3) Troops of Omer Vrioni and Köse Mehmet Pasha; 4) Athanasios Diakos captured; 5) Diakos impaled.

After the death of Ali Pasha, Omer was among the commanders who were sent by Hurşid Ahmed Pasha, the new commander-in-chief, to suppress the Greek Revolution which had broken out in March 1821. On 24 April 1821, he defeated the Greeks at the Battle of Alamana and had their commander, Athanasios Diakos, impaled. Vrioni's advance was temporarily halted by Odysseas Androutsos who, with a handful of men, inflicted heavy casualties upon him at the Battle of the inn of Gravia on 8 May 1821.

=== Siege of Missolonghi ===
In late 1822, he and Mehmed Reshid Pasha joined forces to besiege the town of Missolonghi. The town was completely surrounded on 25 October, and might have fallen, had the locals left the city. However they successfully resisted the siege and Vrioni resorted to negotiations in order to save his men, against the opinion of Mehmed Reshid and Yussuf Pasha. The besieged Greeks destroyed the morale of the Ottoman army and when they were reinforced by sea the novice Turkish captains and the two pashas scheduled their main assault for Christmas night, 24 December, calculating that the Greeks would be caught by surprise. However, the attack failed. Six days later, the siege was lifted.

== Later career ==
As a result of this failure, the antagonism between Omer Vrioni and Mehmed Reshid escalated, resulting in his recall by the Porte in 1824, when he was assigned a command in Macedonia. During the later Russo-Turkish War of 1828, he led a 20,000 strong army in an unsuccessful attempt to relieve the siege of Varna.

== Sources ==
- Ilıcak, Şükrü, ed. (2021). Those Infidel Greeks: The Greek War of Independence through Ottoman Archival Documents. Brill. doi:10.1163/9789004471306. hdl:20.500.12657/50791. ISBN 978-90-04-47129-0.
- Isabella, Maurizio (2023). Southern Europe in the Age of Revolutions. Princeton University Press. ISBN 9780691246192.
- Brewer, David. The Greek War of Independence. The Overlook Press, 2001. ISBN 1-58567-395-1
- Finlay, George (1861). History of the Greek Revolution. London: William Blackwood and Sons.
