= Sanjak of Eğriboz =

Former Ottoman province in Greece

- Sanjak of the Ottoman Empire
- 1471–1821/1833
- Central Greece in the early 19th century, showing the sanjak of Eğriboz ("Negropont") in the lower right corner
- Capital: Chalkis (Eğriboz or Negroponte)
- History
  - Established: 1471
  - Greek War of Independence: 1821/1833
| Preceded by | Succeeded by |
| Sanjak of Tirhala; Triarchy of Negroponte | Areopagus of Eastern Continental Greece; Kingdom of Greece |
- Today part of: Greece

The Sanjak of Eğriboz or Ağriboz (Greek: Σαντζάκι Ευρίπου) was an Ottoman province (sanjak) encompassing eastern Continental Greece. Its name derives from its capital, Eğriboz/Ağriboz, the Turkish form of Euripos, another name of Chalkis. In contemporary English sources it is usually known as Negropont after the Italian name for Chalkis and the island of Euboea, Negroponte.

The sanjak was formed in 1471, after the Ottoman conquest of the Venetian colony of Negroponte (1470). Negroponte was joined with the territories taken from the recently (1456) conquered Duchy of Athens, which had until then been administered by the sanjakbey of Trikala, to form the new province, which encompassed all of eastern Continental Greece.

According to the 17th-century geographer Hajji Khalifa, it was divided in ten districts (kazas): Eğriboz proper, encompassing central Euboea; Kizil Hissar (Karystos, in southern Euboea); Oderbos (Oreoi, in northern Euboea); Izdin/Zeitun (Zitouni, modern Lamia); Modunish (Mendenitsa); Talanda (Atalanti); Atina (Athens with most of Attica); Egina (Aigina); Istifa (Thebes); Esedabad (Tourkochori); Mestube; Rubus (Oropos); Kefsa (Kifissia); Megara. Early 19th-century sources report only nine: Eğriboz, Talanda, Livadya (Livadeia), Kizil Hissar, Salna (Salona, Amfissa), Izdin, Istifa, Athens, and Esedabad. However, the city of Athens itself was a personal property of the kizlar agha, the powerful Chief Black Eunuch of the Imperial Harem, and administered in his name by a voivode.

Like all other provinces of southern Greece, from 1533 the sanjak was subordinated to the Eyalet of the Archipelago, under the chief admiral of the Ottoman Navy, the Kapudan Pasha.

Most of the sanjak rose up in revolt during the early period of the Greek War of Independence, and the Greek rebels established a regional administration known as the Areopagus of Eastern Continental Greece. Control of the region shifted between Greeks and Turks during the war, but Thebes remained in Ottoman hands and Euboea was held by the capable Omer Pasha of Kizil Hissar. The last Ottoman strongholds were surrendered to Greek control only in 1832–1833, after the Ottoman government recognized Greek independence.

== See also ==
- Hadji Ali Haseki
