= 1829 =

1829 in various calendars
- Gregorian calendar: 1829; MDCCCXXIX
- Ab urbe condita: 2582
- Armenian calendar: 1278; ԹՎ ՌՄՀԸ
- Assyrian calendar: 6579
- Balinese saka calendar: 1750–1751
- Bengali calendar: 1235–1236
- Berber calendar: 2779
- British Regnal year: 9 Geo. 4 – 10 Geo. 4
- Buddhist calendar: 2373
- Burmese calendar: 1191
- Byzantine calendar: 7337–7338
- Chinese calendar: 戊子年 (Earth Rat); 4526 or 4319 — to — 己丑年 (Earth Ox); 4527 or 4320
- Coptic calendar: 1545–1546
- Discordian calendar: 2995
- Ethiopian calendar: 1821–1822
- Hebrew calendar: 5589–5590
- Hindu calendars
- Vikram Samvat: 1885–1886
- Shaka Samvat: 1750–1751
- Kali Yuga: 4929–4930
- Holocene calendar: 11829
- Igbo calendar: 829–830
- Iranian calendar: 1207–1208
- Islamic calendar: 1244–1245
- Japanese calendar: Bunsei 12 (文政１２年)
- Javanese calendar: 1756–1757
- Julian calendar: Gregorian minus 12 days
- Korean calendar: 4162
- Minguo calendar: 83 before ROC 民前83年
- Nanakshahi calendar: 361
- Thai solar calendar: 2371–2372
- Tibetan calendar: ས་ཕོ་བྱི་བ་ལོ་ (male Earth-Rat); 1955 or 1574 or 802 — to — ས་མོ་གླང་ལོ་ (female Earth-Ox); 1956 or 1575 or 803

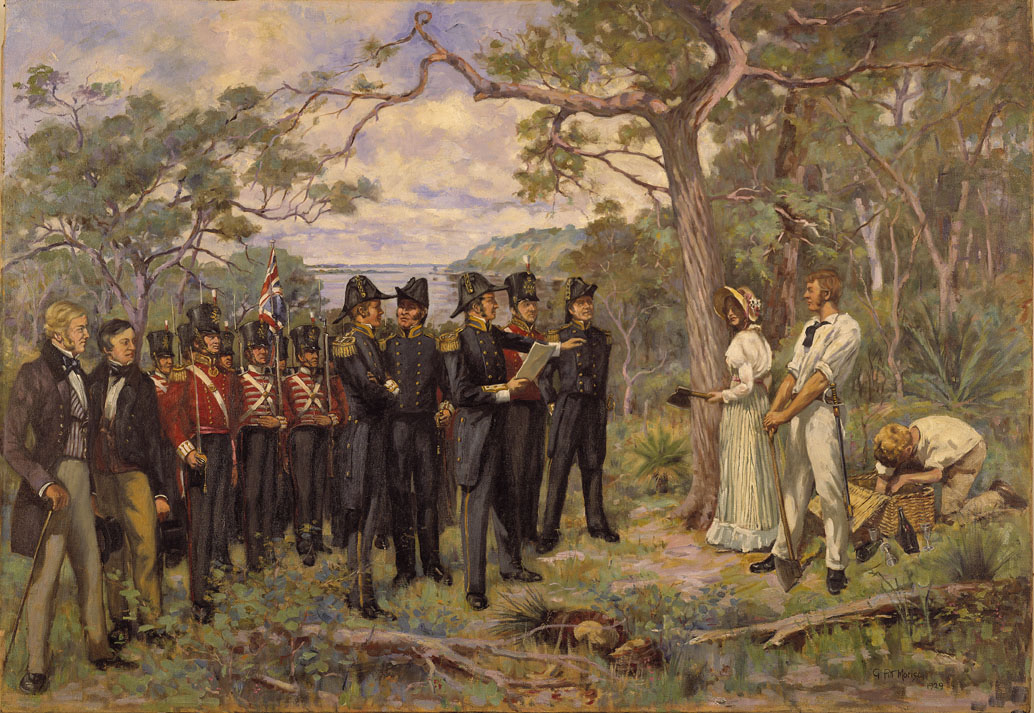
June 3: Perth is founded in Australia.

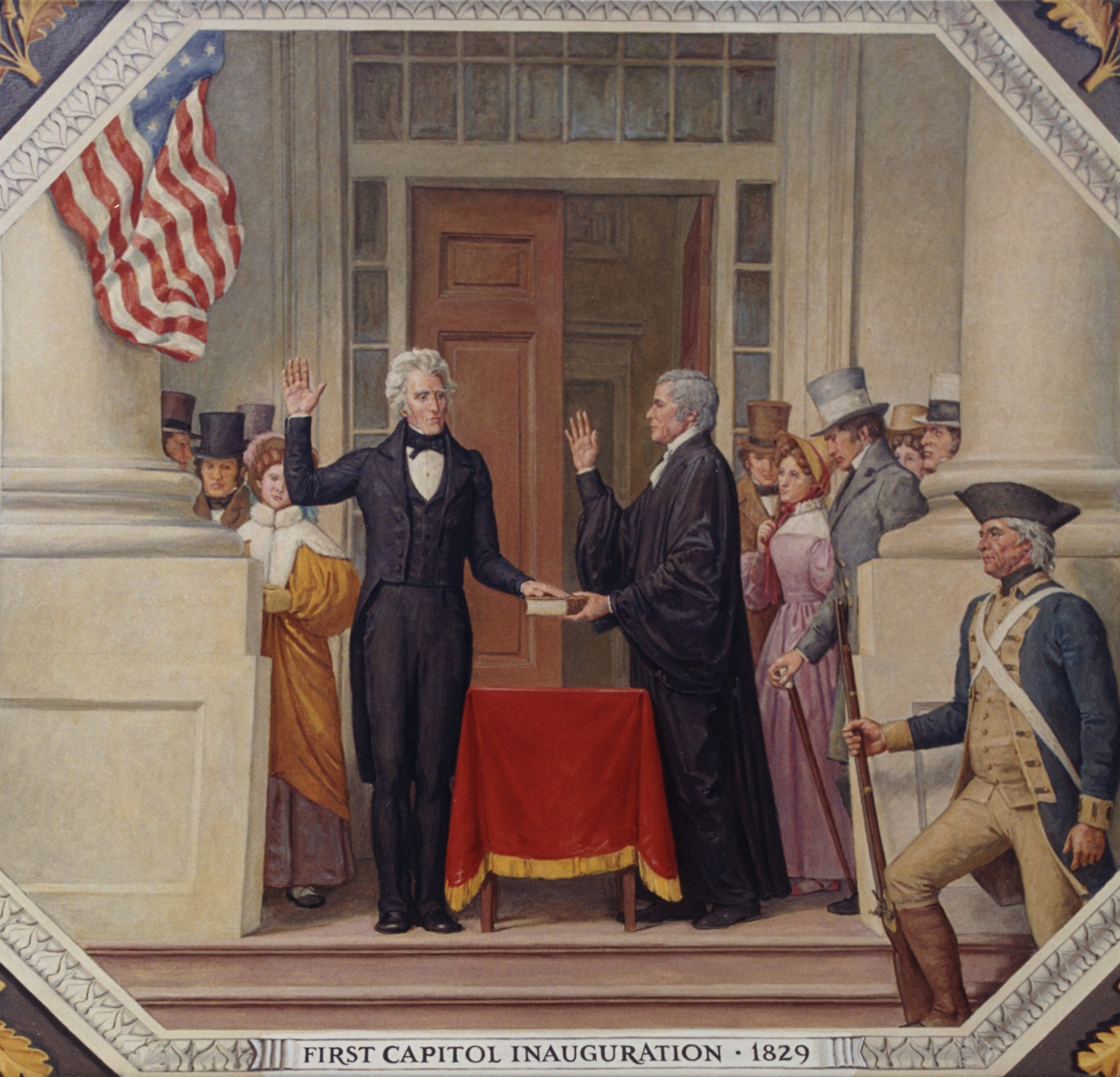
March 4: First populist U.S. President, Andrew Jackson, is inaugurated in Washington D.C. and invites the general public to tour the White House.

1829 (MDCCCXXIX) was a common year starting on Thursday of the Gregorian calendar and a common year starting on Tuesday of the Julian calendar, the 1829th year of the Common Era (CE) and Anno Domini (AD) designations, the 829th year of the 2nd millennium, the 29th year of the 19th century, and the 10th and last year of the 1820s decade. As of the start of 1829, the Gregorian calendar was 12 days ahead of the Julian calendar, which remained in localized use until 1923.

== Events ==
=== January–March ===
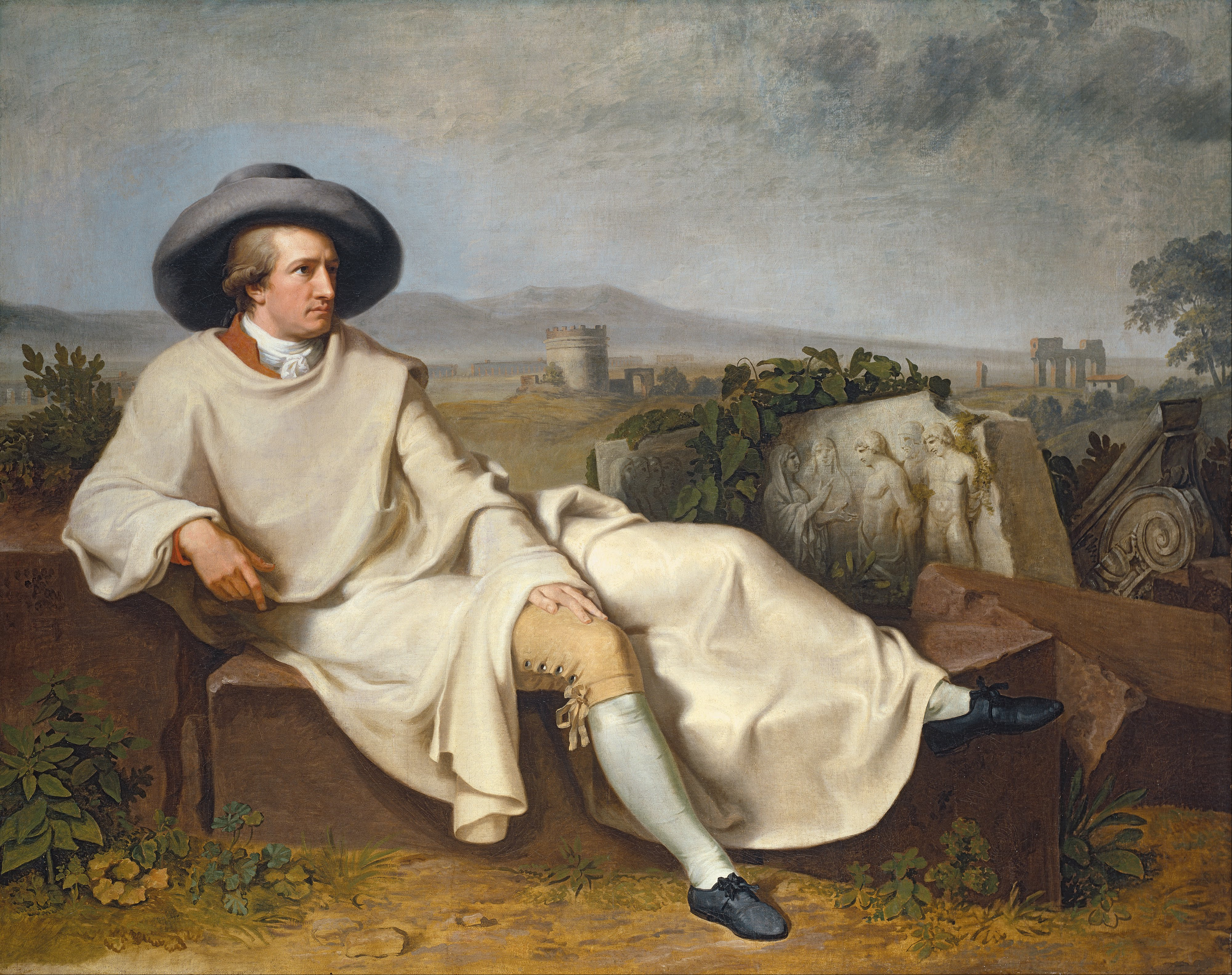
January 19: Johann Wolfgang von Goethe

- January 19 – August Klingemann's adaptation of Johann Wolfgang von Goethe's Faust premieres in Braunschweig.
- February 27 – Battle of Tarqui: Troops of Gran Colombia and Peru battle to a draw.
- March 11 – German composer Felix Mendelssohn conducts the first performance of Johann Sebastian Bach's St Matthew Passion since the latter's death in 1750, in Berlin; the success of this performance sparks a revival of interest in Bach.
- March 21 – The bloodless Wellington–Winchilsea duel takes place at Battersea near London
- March 22 – Greece receives autonomy from the Ottoman Empire in the London Protocol, signed by Russia, France and Britain, effectively ending the Greek War of Independence. Greece continues to seek full independence through diplomatic negotiations with the three Great Powers.
- March 31 – Pope Pius VIII succeeds Pope Leo XII as the 253rd pope.

=== April–June ===
- April 1 – Vicente Guerrero becomes president of Mexico.
- April 4 – The Mexican city of Cuautla, Morelos, is founded.
- April 13 – The Catholic Relief Act is passed by the Parliament of the United Kingdom, granting a substantial measure of Catholic emancipation in Britain and Ireland.
- April 21– Popular German conductor Felix Mendelssohn begins his first of 10 visits to Britain, touring the island until November 28. This includes the first London performance of his concert overture to A Midsummer Night's Dream, and his trip to Fingal's Cave.
- May 6 – The patent for an instrument called the accordion is applied for by Cyrill Demian (officially approved on May 23).
- May 15 – Joseph Smith claims to have received the Aaronic Priesthood from John the Baptist.
- June 1 – The Philadelphia Inquirer is founded in the U.S. as The Pennsylvania Inquirer.
- June 3 – The Swan River Colony (later to become the cities of Perth and Fremantle) is founded in Western Australia. This secures the western third of the Australian landmass for the British.
- June 5 – HMS Pickle captures the armed slave ship Voladora off the coast of Cuba.
- June 10 – The Oxford University Boat Club wins the first inter-university Boat Race, rowed at Henley-on-Thames.
- June 19 – Robert Peel establishes the Metropolitan Police Service in London, the first modern police force. The first officers, known by the nickname "bobbies", go on patrol on September 29.

=== July–September ===
- July 2 – Russo-Turkish War (1828–29): Russian Field-Marshal Hans Karl von Diebitsch launches the Trans-Balkan Offensive, which brings the Russian army within 68 kilometres (42 mi) of Istanbul.
- July 4 – George Shillibeer begins operating the first bus service in London.
- July 23 – In the United States, William Burt obtains the first patent for a form of typewriter, the typographer.
- August 3 – Gioacchino Rossini's opera William Tell (Guillaume Tell) is first performed, in Paris.
- August 8 – The Prince de Polignac succeeds the Vicomte de Martignac as Prime Minister of France.
- August 10 – Finsteraarhorn, the highest summit of the Bernese Alps, is first ascended.
- August 12 – Mrs. Helen Dance, wife of the captain of the ship Sulphur, cuts down a tree to mark the founding day of the town of Perth, Western Australia.
- August 14 – King's College London is founded by Royal Charter, under the patronage of King George IV and the Prime Minister, The Duke of Wellington.
- September 14 – The Ottoman Empire signs the Treaty of Adrianople with Russia, ending the Russo-Turkish War.
- September 28 – African-American abolitionist David Walker publishes his Appeal to the Coloured Citizens of the World, in Boston, Massachusetts.

=== October–December ===
- October 1 – South African College is inaugurated in Cape Town.
- October 14 – Stephenson's Rocket wins the Rainhill trials to determine the practicality of steam locomotives to operate the Liverpool and Manchester Railway in England.
- October 16 – The first modern hotel in the United States, Tremont House (Boston), opens.
- October 17 – Kaspar Hauser is found wounded.
- November 5
  - Technical University of Denmark (DTU) opens.
  - The Chalmers University of Technology is founded in Gothenburg, Sweden.
- November 30 – The original Welland Canal opens for a trial run, with a ceremony at Port Dalhousie, Upper Canada.
- December 4 – In India, Lord William Bentinck, British Governor General of the Presidency of Fort William in Bengal, pushes through a regulation declaring that all who abet sati (suttee) (the self-immolation of a widow on her husband's funeral pyre) in parts of British India are guilty of culpable homicide. This follows long campaigning by Bengali reformer Ram Mohan Roy.

== Births ==
=== January ===
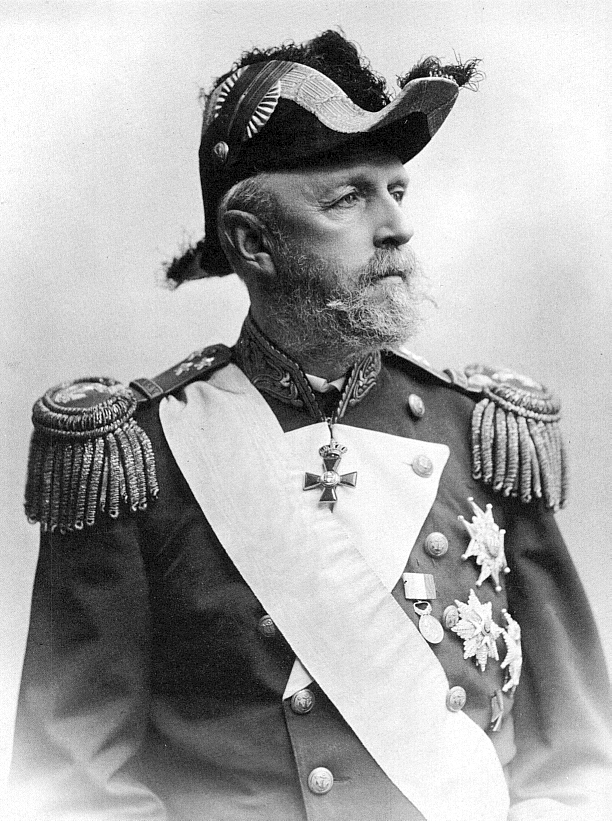
King Oscar II of Sweden

- January 1 – Tommaso Salvini, Italian actor (d. 1915)
- January 3 – Konrad Duden, German philologist (d. 1911)
- January 10 – Epameinondas Deligeorgis, Prime Minister of Greece (d. 1879)
- January 17 – Catherine Booth, English Mother of The Salvation Army (d. 1890)
- January 21 – King Oscar II of Sweden and Norway (d. 1907)
- January 27 – Isaac Roberts, Welsh astronomer (d. 1904).

=== February ===
- February 2
  - Alfred Brehm, German zoologist (d. 1884)
  - William Stanley, British inventor, engineer (d. 1909)
- February 22 – Princess Sumiko, Japanese princess (d. 1881)
- February 26 – Levi Strauss, American clothing designer (d. 1902).

=== March ===
- March 2 – Carl Schurz, German revolutionary, American statesman (d. 1906)
- March 14 – Pierre-Hector Coullié, Cardinal-Archbishop of Lyon (d. 1912)
- March 16 – George M. Robeson, American politician (d. 1897)
- March 19 – Carl Frederik Tietgen, Danish financier, industrialist (d. 1901).

=== April ===
- April 6 – Anna Haslam, Irish women's rights activist, suffragist (d. 1922)
- April 10 – William Booth, British founder of The Salvation Army (d. 1912).

=== May ===
- May 8 – Louis Moreau Gottschalk, American composer, pianist (d. 1869).

=== June ===
- June 4 – Allan Octavian Hume, British civil servant (d. 1912)
- June 5 – George Stephen, 1st Baron Mount Stephen, Scottish-Canadian businessman, philanthropist (d. 1921)
- June 6 – Shusaku Honinbo, Japanese Go player (d. 1862)
- June 8 – Sir John Everett Millais, British Pre-Raphaelite painter (d. 1896)
- June 14 – Bernard Petitjean, French Catholic missionary to Japan (d. 1884)
- June 16 – Geronimo, indigenous American (Apache) leader (d. 1909).

=== July ===
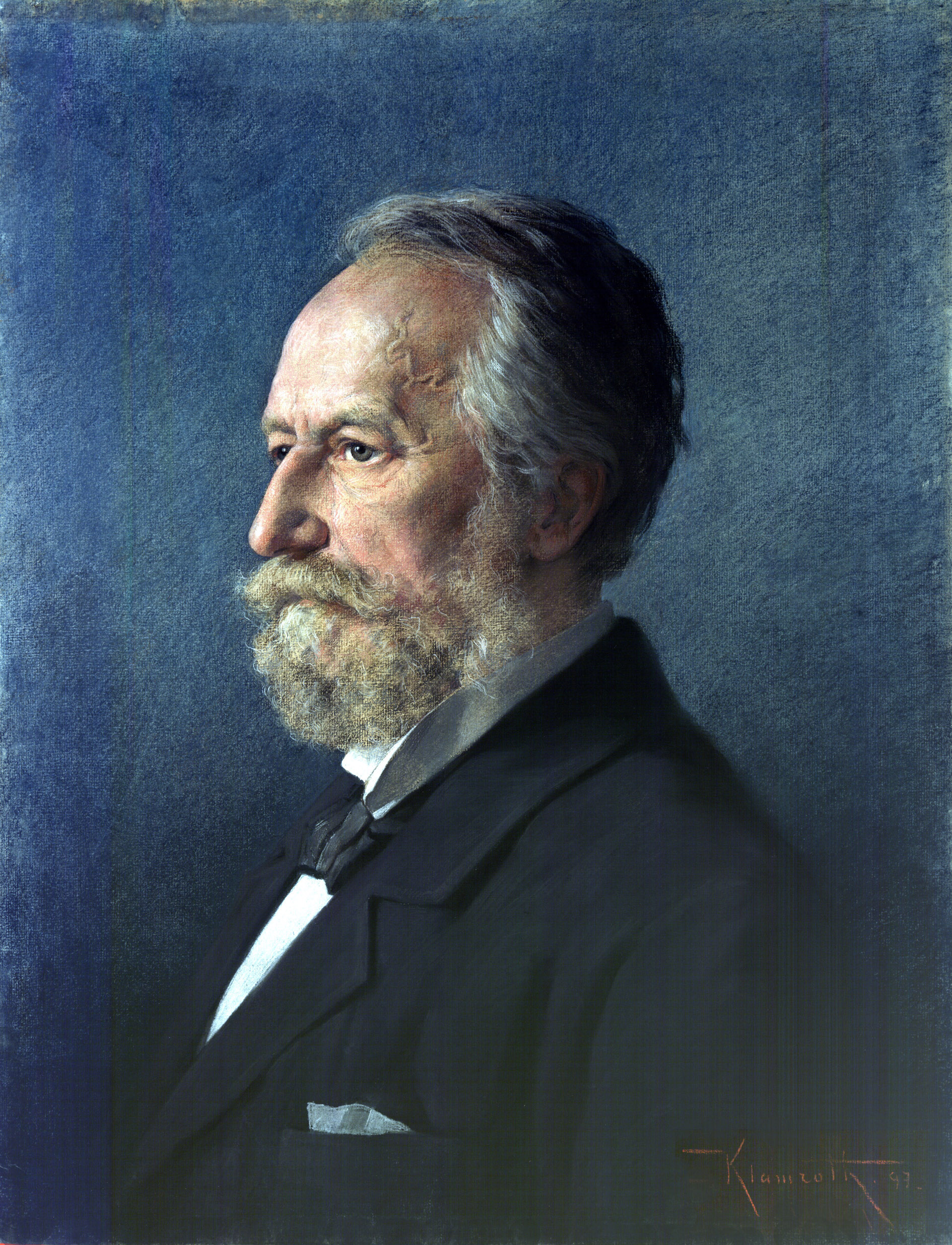
Adolf Eugen Fick

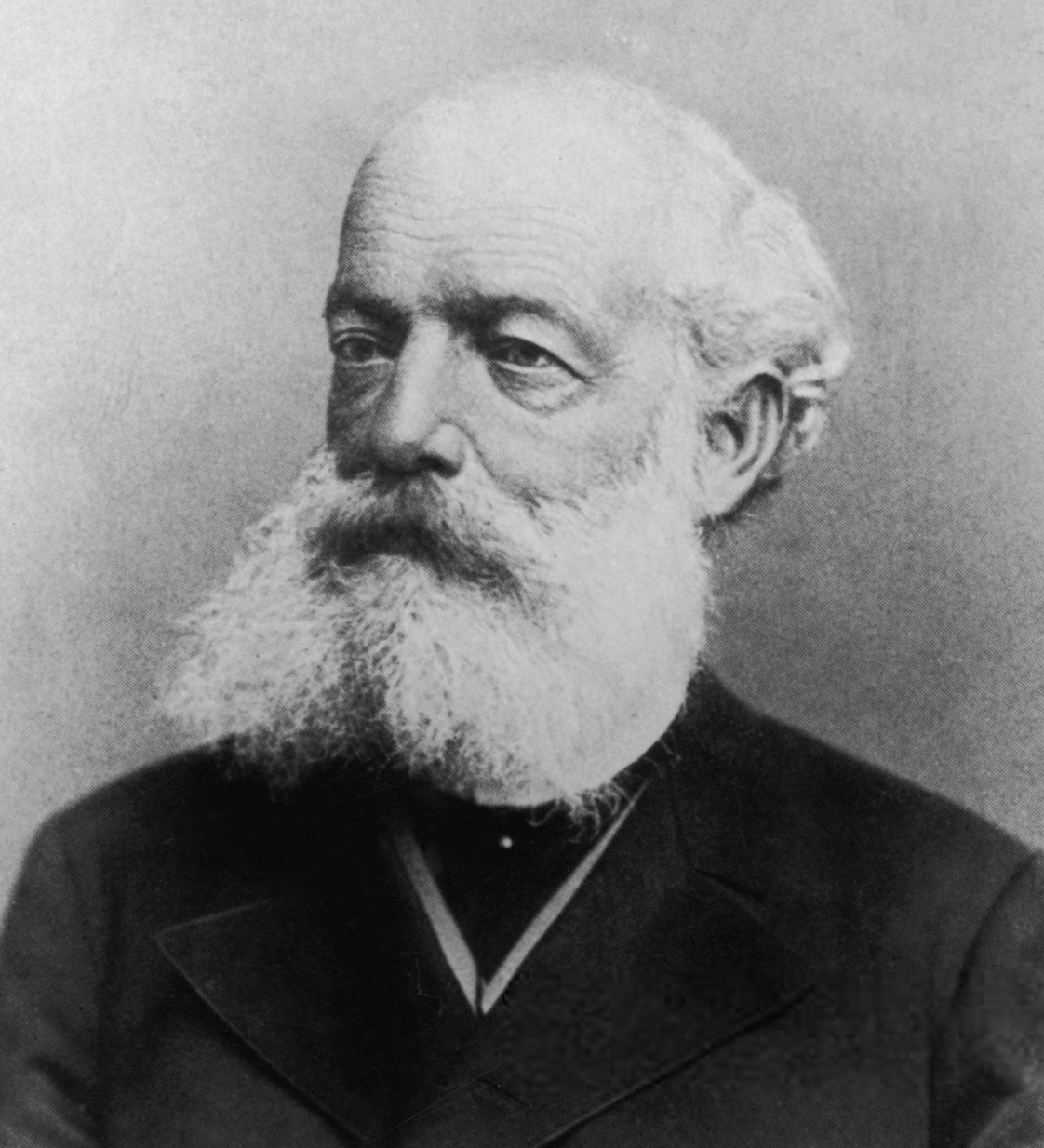
August Kekulé

- July 2 – Martis Karin Ersdotter, Swedish businesswoman (died 1902)
- July 14 – Edward White Benson, Archbishop of Canterbury (d. 1896)
- July 26 – Auguste Beernaert, Belgian statesman, recipient of the Nobel Peace Prize (d. 1912).

=== August ===
- August 24 – Emanuella Carlbeck, Swedish social reformer (d. 1901).

=== September ===
- September 3 – Adolf Eugen Fick, German-born physician, physiologist (d. 1901)
- September 7 – August Kekulé, German chemist (d. 1896)
- September 12 – Anselm Feuerbach, German painter (d. 1880).

=== October ===
- October 1 – Sidney Hill, English philanthropist (d. 1908)
- October 5 – Chester A. Arthur, 21st President of the United States (d. 1886)
- October 13 – Jules Pellechet, French architect (d. 1903)
- October 15 – Asaph Hall, American astronomer (d. 1907).

=== November ===
- November 9 – Sir Peter Lumsden, British general in the Indian army (d. 1918)
- November 10 – Newton Knight, American farmer, soldier and Southern Unionist in Mississippi and Civil War guerrilla (d. 1922)
- November 28 – Anton Rubinstein, Russian pianist, composer (d. 1894).

=== December ===
- December 30 – Abel Smith MP, is born in London, England.

== Deaths ==
=== January–June ===
- January 6 – Amalia Holst, German writer, intellectual, and feminist (b. 1758)
- January 12 – Karl Wilhelm Friedrich Schlegel, German poet, philosopher, and philologist (b. 1772)
- January 25 – William Shield, English violinist, composer (b. 1748)
- January 29
  - Paul Barras, French politician (b. 1755)
  - István Pauli (Pável) Hungarian Slovene priest, writer (b. 1760)
  - Timothy Pickering, American politician (b. 1745)
- February 10 – Pope Leo XII (b. 1760)
- February 11 – Alexander Griboyedov, Russian playwright, diplomat (b. 1795)
- February 17 – Michel Ange Bernard Mangourit, French diplomat (b. 1752)
- February 21 – Kittur Chennamma, Indian queen regnant (b. 1778)
- February 26 – Johann Heinrich Wilhelm Tischbein, German painter (b. 1751)
- March 2 – Karl Gottfried Hagen, German chemist (b. 1749)
- March 5 – John Adams, last surviving Bounty mutineer (b. 1767)
- March 8 – Francesco Ruspoli, 3rd Prince of Cerveteri (b. 1752)
- March 30 – Christopher Frederik Lowzow, Danish-Norwegian army officer (b. 1752)
- April 6 – Niels Henrik Abel, Norwegian mathematician (b. 1802)
- April 18 – Veronika Gut, Swiss rebel heroine (b. 1757)
- May 10 – Thomas Young, English physician, linguist (b. 1773)
- May 17 – John Jay, first Chief Justice of the United States (b. 1745)
- May 21 – Peter I, Grand Duke of Oldenburg (b. 1755)

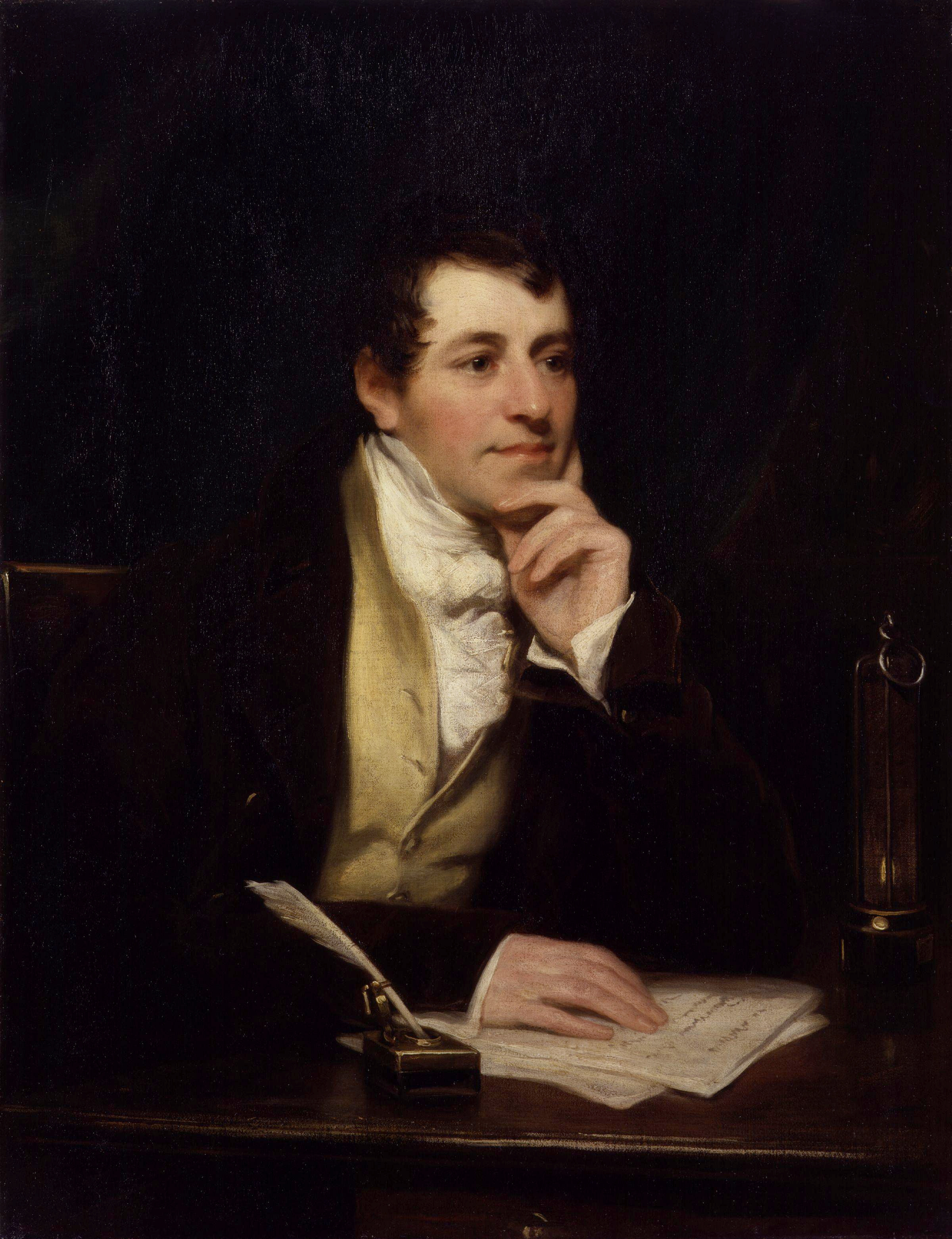
Humphry Davy

- May 29 – Humphry Davy, British chemist (b. 1778)
- May 30 – Louis Aloysius, Prince of Hohenlohe-Waldenburg-Bartenstein (b. 1765)
- June 6 – Shanawdithit, last known pure-blooded member of the Beothuk people (b. c. 1801)
- June 15 – Therese Huber, German writer and scholar (b. 1764)
- June 27 – James Smithson, British mineralogist, chemist, whose fortune eventually went to the United States of America, and was used to initially fund the Smithsonian Institution (b. 1764)

=== July–December ===
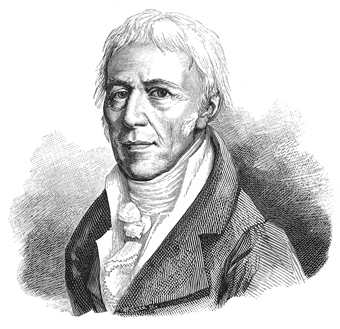
Jean-Baptiste Lamarck

- July 11 – Hannah Mather Crocker, American essayist, advocate of women's rights in America (b. 1752)
- July 23 – Wojciech Bogusławski, actor and director, Father of Polish Theatre (b. 1757)
- August 7 – John Reeves, British judge (b. 1752)
- September 28 – David Gillespie, American surveyor and politician (b. 1774)
- October 10 – Maria Elizabetha Jacson, British botanist (b. 1755)
- October 29 – Maria Anna Mozart ("Nannerl"), Austrian musician and composer, sister of Wolfgang Amadeus Mozart (b. 1751)
- November 12 – Jean-Baptiste Regnault, French painter (b. 1754)
- November 14
  - Maria Beatrice d'Este, Duchess of Massa, Duchess of Massa and Princess of Carrara (b. 1750)
  - Louis Nicolas Vauquelin, French chemist, discoverer of beryllium and chromium (b. 1763)
- November 26 – Bushrod Washington, American Supreme Court justice (b. 1762)
- December 12 – John Lansing Jr., American statesman (disappeared) (b. 1754)
- December 28
  - Elizabeth Freeman, African American slave
  - Jean-Baptiste Lamarck, French scientist (b. 1744)
  - Bill Richmond, British boxer (b. 1763)
- December 29 – Princess Henrietta of Nassau-Weilburg (b. 1797) (scarlet fever)

=== Date unknown ===
- Huang Lü, Chinese scientist
