= Invasion =

Forced entry by a polity into another polity's territory

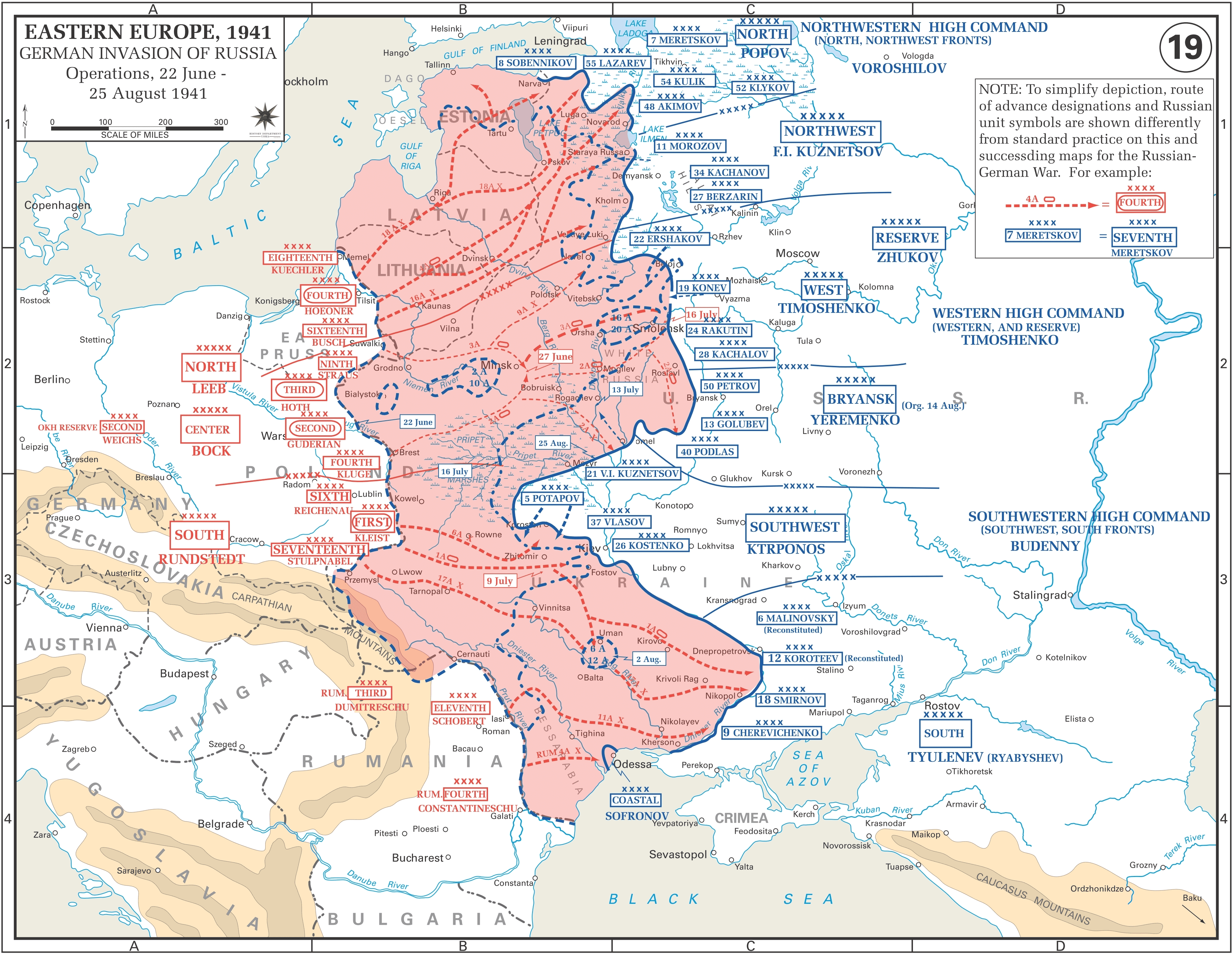
Map of the first phase of Operation Barbarossa on 25 August, 1941

In geopolitics, an invasion typically refers to a military offensive in which a polity sends combatants, usually in large numbers, to forcefully enter the territory of another polity, with either side possibly being supported by one or more allies. While strategic goals for an invasion can be numerous and complex in nature, the foremost tactical objective normally involves militarily occupying part or all of the invaded polity's territory. Today, if a polity conducts an invasion without having been attacked by their opponent beforehand, it is widely considered to constitute an international crime and condemned as an act of aggression.

Historically, invasions have variously been associated with conquest and annexation, self-defence (if the invader was attacked first), liberation of the invaded polity's people (or of territory that had been occupied by it), or the establishment or re-establishment of control or authority over a territory. Other common motives include forcing the partition of a polity, toppling or altering the established government of a polity or gaining concessions from said government, or intervening to support a belligerent in a polity's civil war.

An invasion can be the cause of a war, be a part of a larger strategy to end a war, or it can constitute an entire war in itself. Due to the large scale of the military operations associated with invasions, they are usually strategic in planning and execution.

== History ==
Archaeological evidence indicates that invasions have been frequent occurrences since prehistory. In antiquity, before radio communications and fast transportation, the only way for a military to ensure adequate reinforcements was to move armies as one massive force. This, by its very nature, led to the strategy of invasion. With invasion came cultural exchanges in government, religion, philosophy, and technology that shaped the development of much of the ancient world.

== Defenses ==
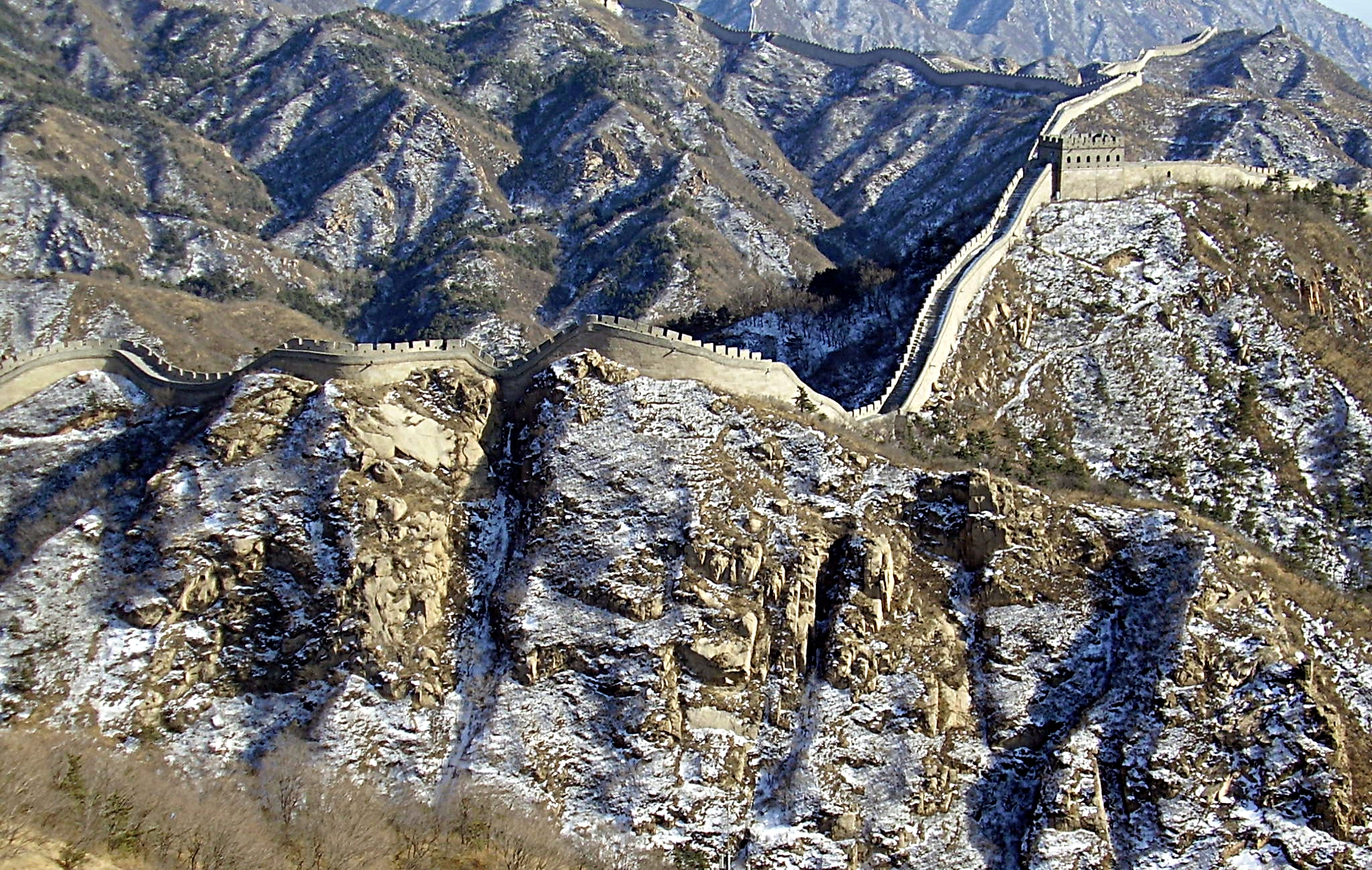
The Great Wall of China, built to defend China from invasion.

States with potentially hostile neighbors typically adopt defensive measures to delay or forestall an invasion. In addition to utilizing geographical barriers such as rivers, marshes, or rugged terrain, these measures have historically included fortifications. Such a defense can be intended to actively prevent invading forces from entering the country by means of an extended and well-defended barrier; the Great Wall of China, Hadrian's Wall, and the Danewerk are famous examples. Such barriers have also included trench lines and, in more modern times, minefields, cameras, and motion-sensitive sensors. However, these barriers can require a large military force to provide the defense, as well as maintain the equipment and positions, which can impose a great economic burden on the country. Some of those same techniques can also be turned against defenders, used to keep them from escape or resupply. During Operation Starvation, Allied forces used airdropped mines to severely disrupt Japanese logistical operations within their own borders.

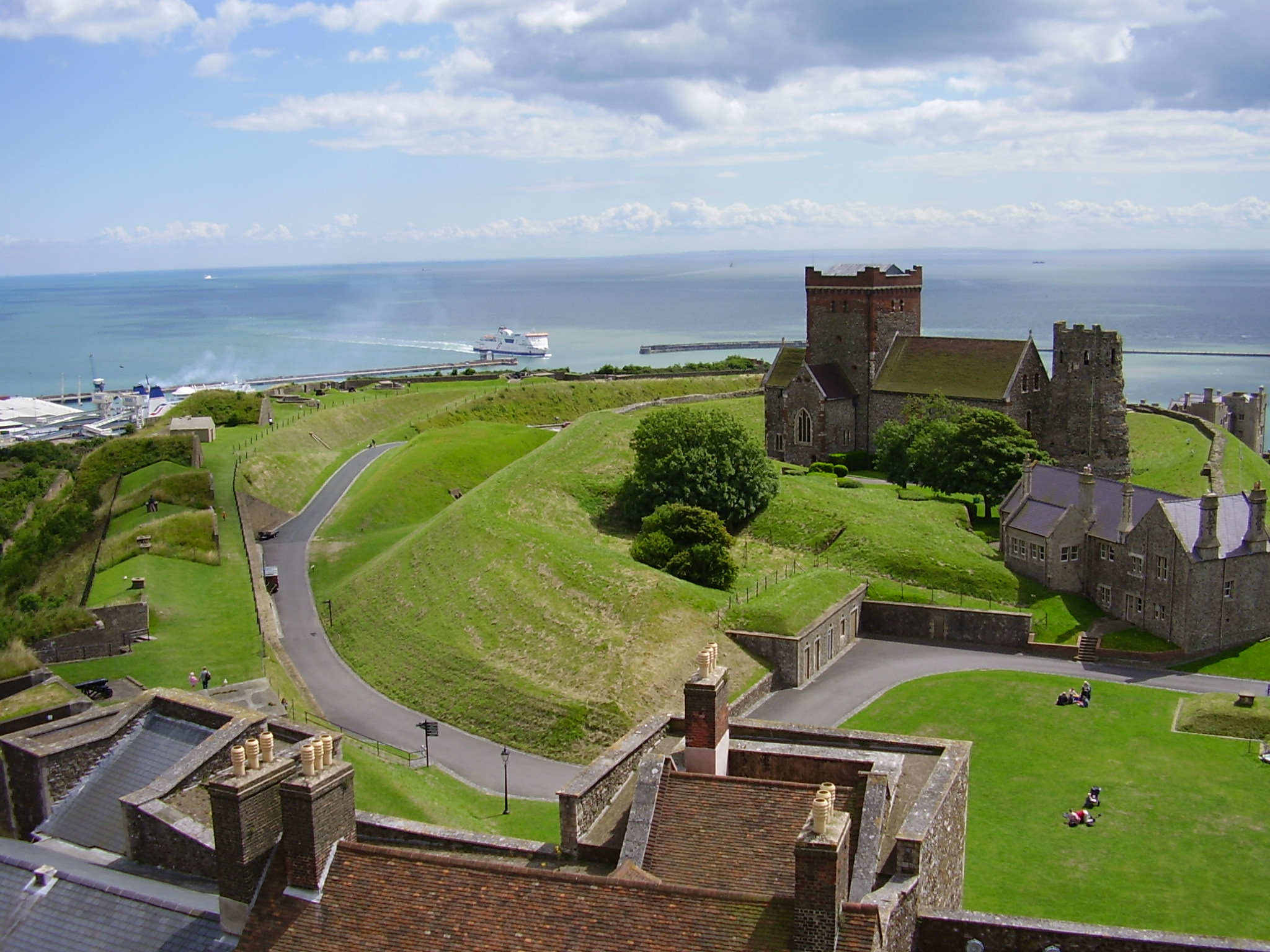
View from Dover Castle.

Alternatively, the fortifications can be built up at a series of sites, such as castles or forts placed near a border. These structures are designed to delay an invasion long enough for the defending nation to mobilize an army of a size sufficient for defense or, in some cases, counter-invasion—such as, for example, the Maginot Line. Forts can be positioned so that the garrisons can interdict the supply lines of the invaders. The theory behind these spaced forts is that the invader cannot afford to bypass these defenses, and so must lay siege to the structures.

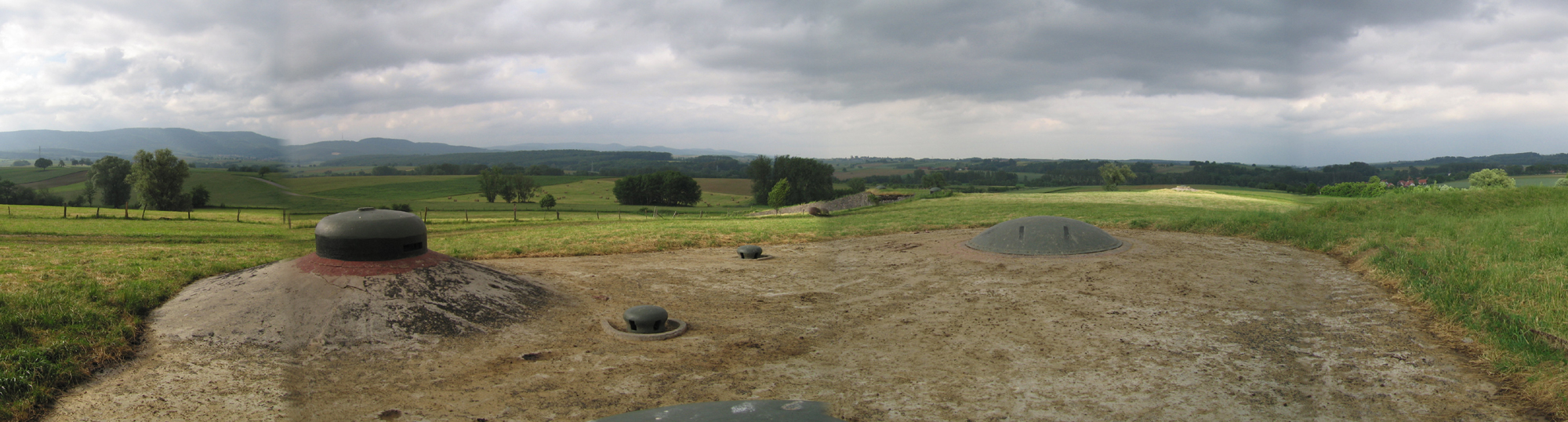
The view from a battery at Ouvrage Schoenenbourg in Alsace; notice the retractable turret in the left foreground.

In modern times, the notion of constructing large-scale static defenses to combat land-based threats has largely become obsolete. The use of precision air campaigns and large-scale mechanization have made lighter, more mobile defenses desirable to military planners. The obsolescence of large fortifications was displayed by the failure of the Maginot Line in the beginning of World War Two. Nations defending against modern invasions normally use large population centers such as cities or towns as defensive points. The invader must capture these points to destroy the defender's ability to wage war. The defender uses mobile armored and infantry divisions to protect these points, but the defenders are still very mobile and can normally retreat. A prominent example of the use of cities as fortifications can be seen in the Iraqi Army's stands in the 2003 invasion of Iraq at Baghdad, Tikrit, and Basra in the major combat in the Iraq War. A defender can also use these mobile assets to precipitate a counteroffensive like the Soviet Red Army at the Battle of Kursk or the Northern Alliance in Afghanistan.

However, static emplacements remain useful in both defense against naval attacks and defense against air attacks. Naval mines are still an inexpensive but effective way to defend ports and choke off supply lines. Large static air defense systems that combine antiaircraft guns with missile launchers are still the best way to defend against air attacks. Such systems were used effectively by the North Vietnamese around Hanoi. Also, the United States has invested considerable time and money into the construction of a National Missile Defense system, a static defense grid intended to intercept nuclear intercontinental ballistic missiles.

Island nations, such as the United Kingdom or Japan, and continental states with extensive coasts, such as the United States, have utilized a significant naval presence to forestall an invasion of their country, rather than fortifying their border areas. A successful naval defense, however, usually requires a preponderance of naval power and the ability to sustain and service that defense force.

In particularly large nations, the defending force may also retreat to facilitate a counterattack by drawing the invaders deeper into hostile territory. One effect of this tactic is that the invading force becomes too spread out, making supply difficult and making the lines more susceptible to attack. This tactic, although costly, helped the Soviets stop the German advance at Stalingrad. It can also cause the invading force to extend too far, allowing a pincer movement to cut them off from reinforcements. This was the cause of the British defeat at the Battle of Cowpens during the American Revolutionary War. Finally, sending too many reinforcements can leave too few defenders in the attackers' territory, allowing a counter-invasion from other areas, as happened in the Second Punic War.

== Methods ==
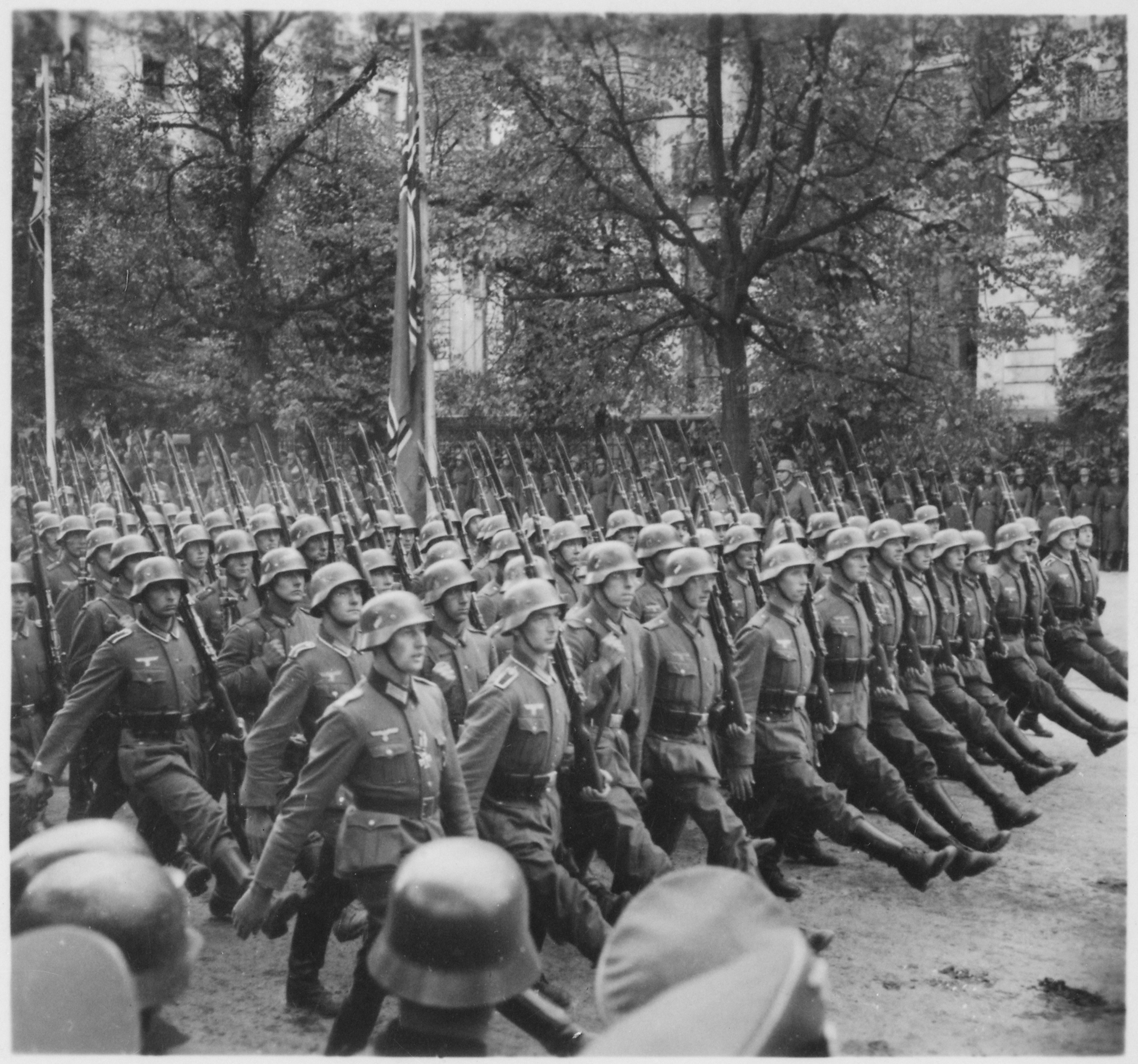
German troops march through Warsaw, Poland, in 1939 during the German invasion of Poland.

There are many different methods by which an invasion can take place, each method having arguments both in their favour and against. These include invasion by land, sea, or air, or any combination of these methods.

=== By land ===
Invasion over land is the straightforward entry of armed forces into an area using existing land connections, usually crossing borders or otherwise defined zones, such as a demilitarized zone, overwhelming defensive emplacements and structures. Although this tactic often results in a quick victory, troop movements are relatively slow and subject to disruption by terrain and weather. Furthermore, it is hard to conceal plans for this method of invasion, as most geopolitical entities take defensive positions in areas that are the most vulnerable to the methods mentioned above.

In modern warfare, invasion by land often takes place after, or sometimes during, attacks on the target by other means. Air strikes and cruise missiles launched from ships at sea are a common method of "softening" the target. Other, more subtle, preparations may involve secretly garnering popular support, assassinating potentially threatening political or military figures, and closing off supply lines where they cross into neighboring countries. In some cases, those other means of attack eliminate the need for ground assault; the 1945 atomic-bombing of Hiroshima and Nagasaki ultimately made it unnecessary for the Allies to invade the Japanese home islands with infantry troops. In cases such as this, while some ground troops are still needed to occupy the conquered territory, they are allowed to enter under the terms of a treaty and as such are no longer invaders. As unmanned, long-range combat evolves, the instances of basic overland invasion become fewer; often the conventional fighting is effectively over before the infantry arrives in the role of peacekeepers.

=== By sea ===
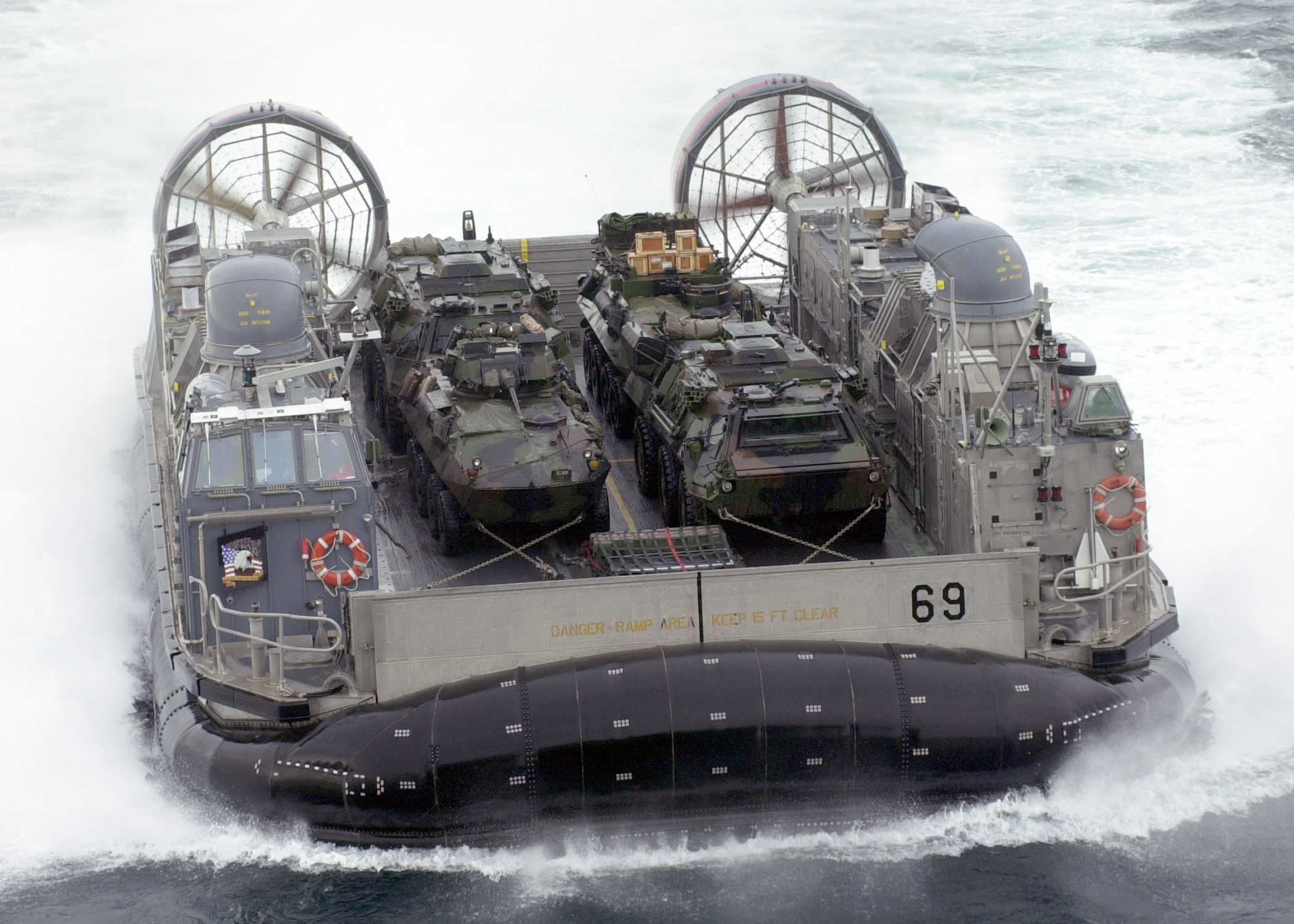
A hovercraft carrying armored vehicles ashore during the 2003 invasion of Iraq

Invasion by sea is the use of a body of water to facilitate the entry of armed forces into an area, often a landmass adjoining the body of water or an island. This is generally used either in conjunction with another method of invasion, and especially before the invention of flight, for cases in which there is no other method to enter the territory in question. Arguments in favor of this method usually consist of the ability to perform a surprise attack from sea, or that naval defenses of the area in question are inadequate to repel such an attack. However, the large amount of specialized equipment, such as amphibious vehicles and the difficulty of establishing defenses—usually with a resulting high casualty count—in exchange for a relatively small gain, are often used as arguments against such an invasion method. Underwater hazards and a lack of good cover are very common problems during invasions from the sea. At the Battle of Tarawa, Marine landing craft became hung up on a coral reef and were shelled from the beach. Other landers were sunk before they could reach the shore, and the tanks they were carrying were stranded in the water. Most of the few survivors of the first wave ended up pinned down on the beach. The island was conquered but at a heavy cost, and the loss of life sparked mass protests from civilians in the United States.

=== By air ===
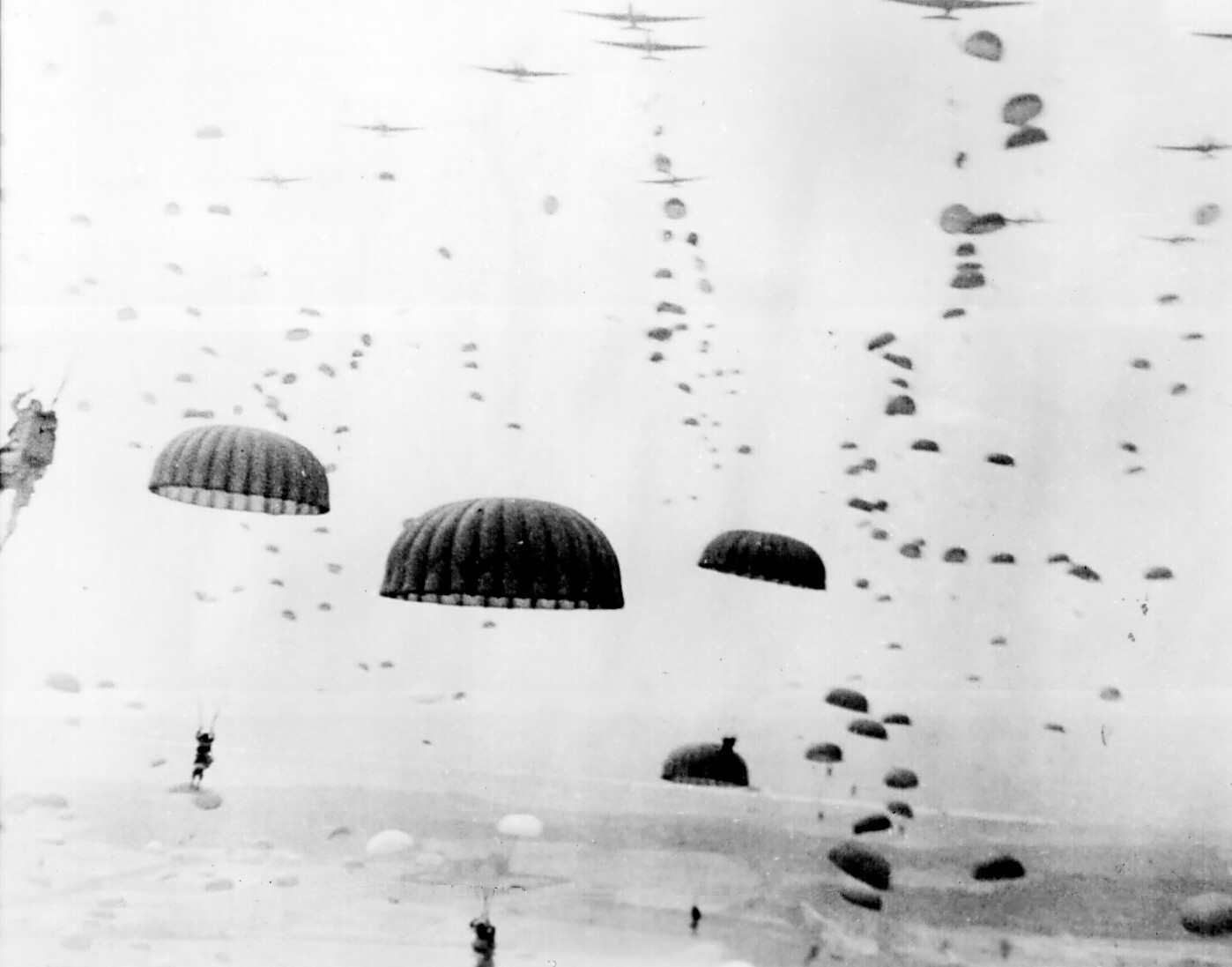
Thousands of paratroopers descend during Operation Market Garden in September 1944.

Invasion by air is an invention of the 20th century and modern warfare. The idea involves sending military units into a territory by aircraft. The aircraft either land, allowing the military units to debark and attempt their objective, or the troops exit the aircraft while still in the air, using parachutes or similar devices to land in the territory being invaded. Many times air assaults have been used to pave the way for a ground- or sea-based invasion, by taking key positions deep behind enemy lines such as bridges and crossroads, but an entirely air-based invasion has never succeeded. Two immediate problems are resupply and reinforcement. A large airborne force cannot be adequately supplied without meeting up with ground forces; an airborne force too small simply places themselves into an immediate envelopment situation. Arguments in favor of this method generally relate to the ability to target specific areas that may not necessarily be easily accessible by land or sea, a greater chance of surprising the enemy and overwhelming defensive structures, and, in many cases, the need for a reduced number of forces due to the element of surprise. Arguments against this method typically involve capacity to perform such an invasion—such as the sheer number of planes that would be needed to carry a sufficient number of troops—and the need for a high level of intelligence in order for the invasion to be successful.

The closest examples to a true air invasion are the Battle of Crete, Operation Thursday (the Chindits second operation during the Burma Campaign) and Operation Market Garden. The latter was an assault on the German-occupied Netherlands conducted in September 1944. Nearly 35,000 men were dropped by parachute and glider into enemy territory in an attempt to capture bridges from the Germans and make way for the Allies' advance. However, even with such a massive force taking the Germans completely by surprise, the assault was a tactical failure and after 9 days of fighting the Allies managed only to escape back to their own lines, having sustained over 18,000 casualties. In the 21st century, as vast improvements are made in anti-aircraft defenses, it seems that the air invasion is a strategy whose time may never come.

=== Pacification ===
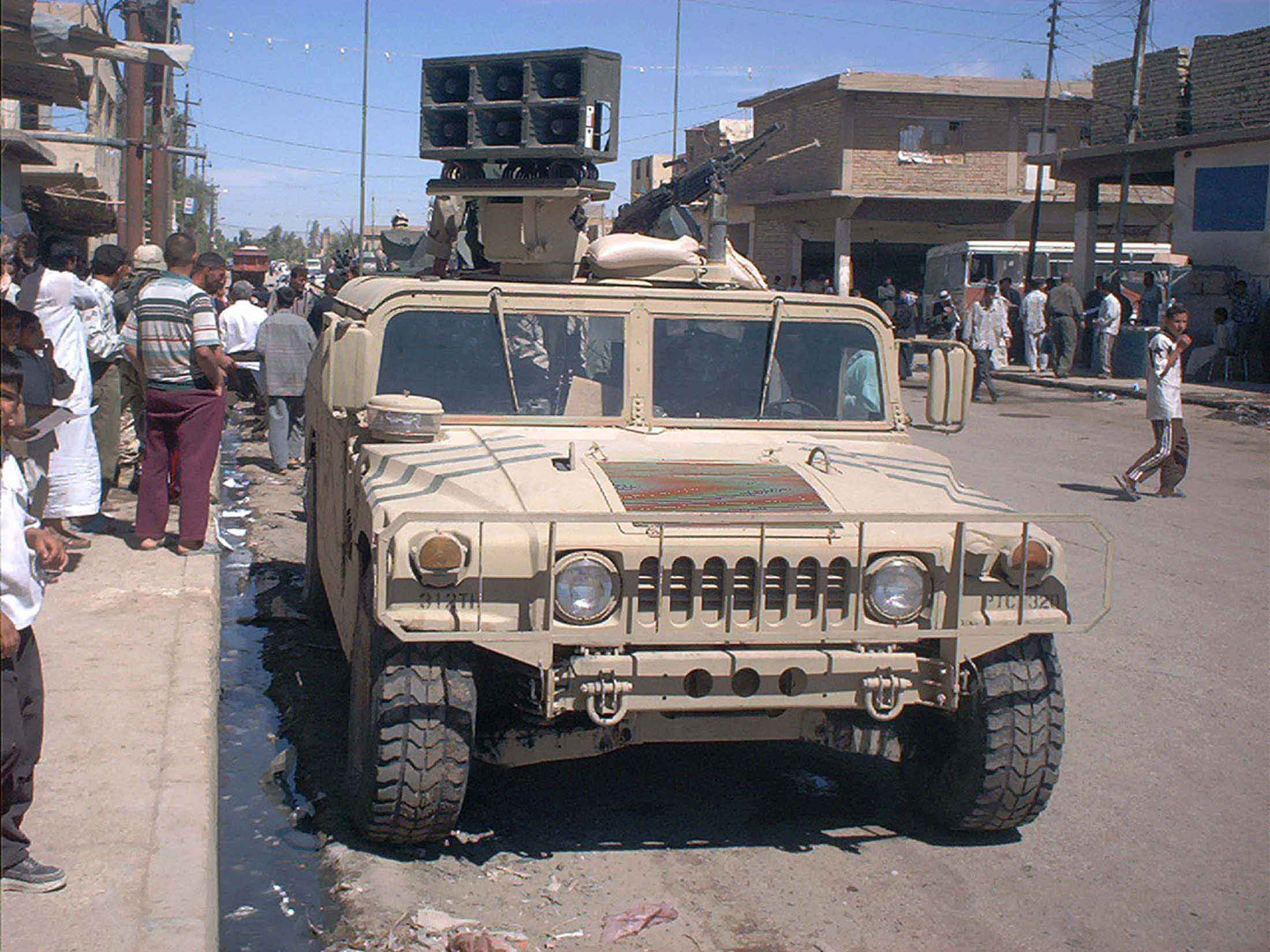
U.S. forces distribute information leaflets on the streets of Kut, Iraq in May 2003.

Once political boundaries and military lines have been breached, pacification of the region is the final, and arguably the most important, goal of the invading force. After the defeat of the regular military, or when one is lacking, continued opposition to an invasion often comes from civilian or paramilitary resistance movements. Complete pacification of an occupied country can be difficult, and usually impossible, but popular support is vital to the success of any invasion.

Media propaganda such as leaflets, books, and radio broadcasts can be used to encourage resistance fighters to surrender and to dissuade others from joining their cause. Pacification, often referred to as "the winning of hearts and minds", reduces the desire for civilians to take up resistance. This may be accomplished through reeducation, allowing conquered citizens to participate in their government, or, especially in impoverished or besieged areas, simply by providing food, water, and shelter. Sometimes displays of military might are used; invading forces may assemble and parade through the streets of conquered towns, attempting to demonstrate the futility of any further fighting. These displays may also include public executions of enemy soldiers, resistance fighters, and other conspirators. Particularly in antiquity, the death or imprisonment of a popular leader was sometimes enough to bring about a quick surrender. However, this has often had the unintended effect of creating martyrs around which popular resistance can rally. For example, Bobby Sands, who died during a hunger strike in Long Kesh prison, became a symbol of the Provisional Irish Republican Army.

== Support ==
=== Logistics ===
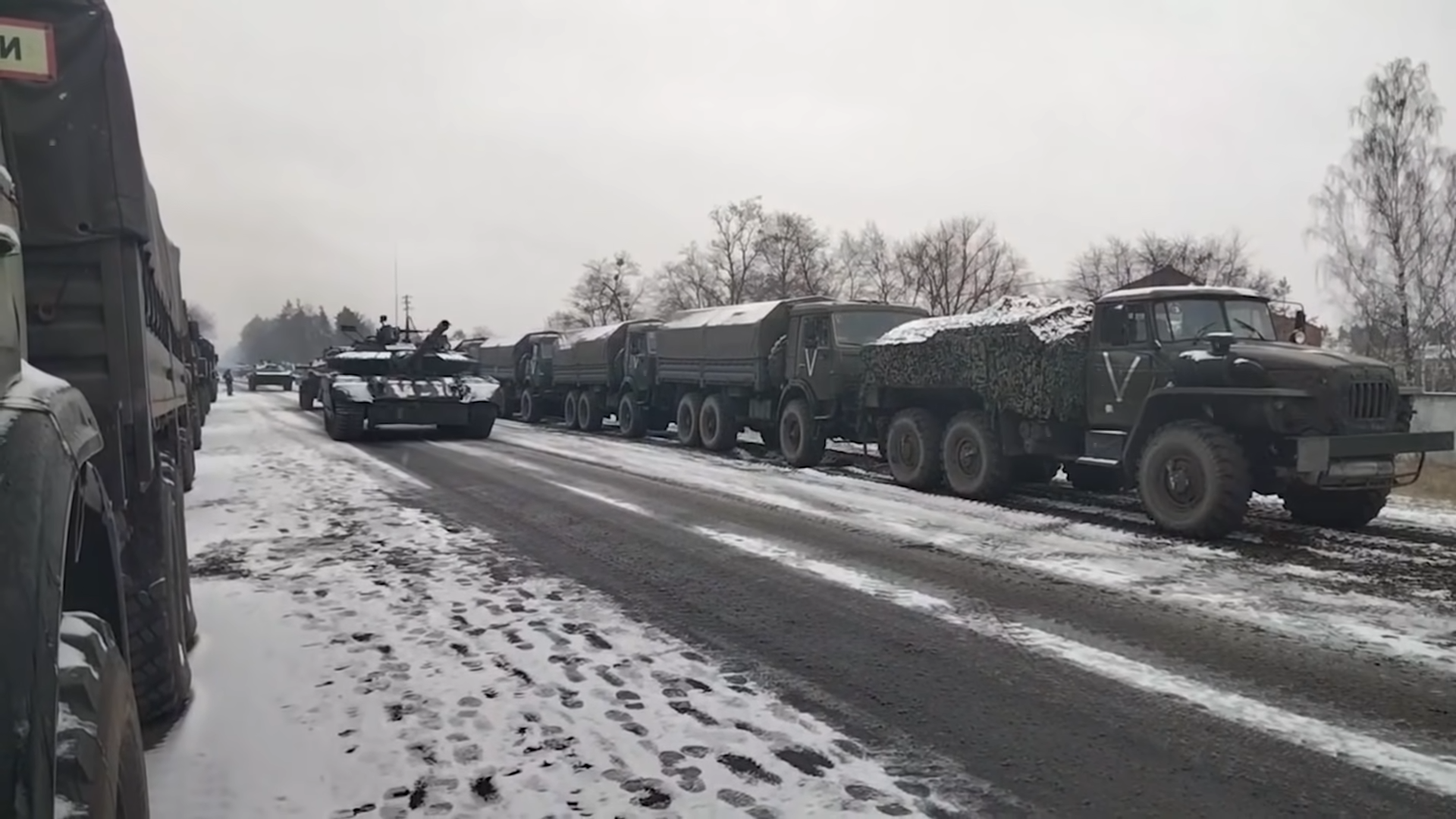
Russian convoy in Kyiv region, during 2022 invasion.

Without a steady flow of supplies, an invading force will soon find itself retreating. Before his invasion of Greece, Xerxes I spent three years amassing supplies from all over Asia; Herodotus wrote that the Persian army was so large it "drank the rivers dry".

In most invasions, even in modern times, many fresh supplies are gathered from the invaded territories themselves. Before the laws of war, invaders often relied heavily on the supplies they would win by conquering towns along the way. During the Second Punic War, for example, Hannibal diverted his army to conquer cities simply to gather supplies; his strategy in crossing the Alps necessitated traveling with as few provisions as possible, expecting the Roman stores to sustain them when they had breached the border. The scorched earth tactics used in Russia forced Napoleon to withdraw his forces due to lack of food and shelter. Today, the Law of land warfare forbids looting and the confiscation of private property, but local supplies, particularly perishables, are still purchased when possible for use by occupying forces, and airplanes often use parachutes to drop supplies to besieged forces. Even as rules become stricter, the necessities of war become more numerous; in addition to food, shelter, and ammunition, today's militaries require fuel, batteries, spare mechanical parts, electronic equipment, and many other things. In the United States, the Defense Logistics Agency employs over 22,000 civilians with the sole task of logistics support, and 30,000 soldiers graduate from the U.S. Army Logistics Management College each year.

=== Communication ===
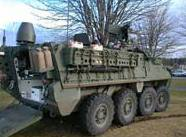
A mobile satellite communications center

Another consideration is the importance of leadership being able to communicate with the invasion force. In ancient times, this often meant that a king needed to lead his armies in person to be certain his commands were timely and followed, as in the case of Alexander the Great (356–323 BCE). At that time, the skills needed to lead troops in battle were as important as the skills needed to run a country during peacetime. When it was necessary for the king to be elsewhere, messengers would relay updates back to the rear, often on horseback or, in cases such as the Battle of Marathon (490 BCE), with swift runners.

When possible, sloops and cutters were used to relay information by sea. HMS Pickle brought Britain the first news that Nelson had defeated the French forces at the Battle of Trafalgar in 1805.

The development of Morse Code, and later of voice communications by radio and satellite, have allowed even small units of skirmishers to remain in contact with a larger invasion force, to verify orders or to call for artillery support and air strikes. These communications were critical to the German blitzkrieg strategy, as infantry commanders relayed defensive positions to tanks and bombers.

=== Public relations ===
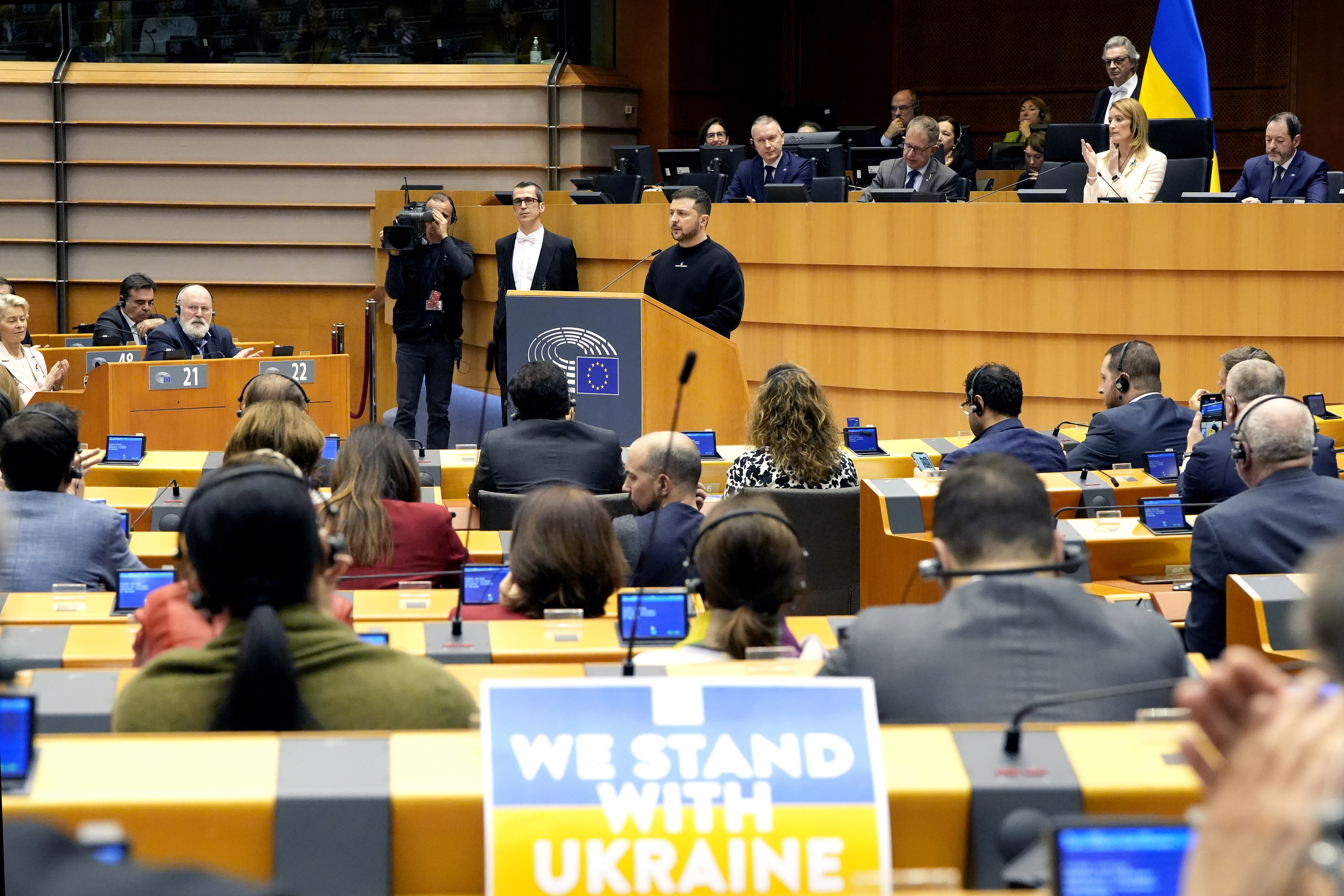
President of Ukraine Volodymyr Zelenskyy addressing the European Parliament during an extraordinary plenary session in Brussels.

In diplomatic, public relations and propaganda terms, it may help an invader (or a potential invader) to have an invitation as an excuse to intervene with a view to "restoring order" or "righting wrongs". Dissident groups, fifth columns or official circles may conspire to "call in" foreign assistance. Cases include:

- From the point of view of the Byzantine Empire, the First Crusade's invasion and conquest of the Levant (1096–1099) resulted from an invitation issued by Emperor Alexios I Komnenos in 1095, seeking assistance against the Turks in Anatolia.
- English barons opposed to King John invited the French Prince Louis to undertake a French invasion of England in the First Barons' War of 1215–1217.
- In 1688 an invitation to William of Orange to invade Britain helped the Glorious Revolution.
- Wolfe Tone asked for French intervention (the unsuccessful Expédition d'Irlande, 1796) in the lead-up to the Irish Rebellion of 1798.
- Some members of the Communist Party of Czechoslovakia allegedly called for Soviet intervention during the Prague Spring of 1968, which ended with the Warsaw Pact invasion of Czechoslovakia in August 1968.

National foundation-legends can echo the theme of inviting foreign warriors to come and rule a people: note the traditional account in the Tale of Bygone Years of how Varangian invaders came establish long-term rule in Novgorod (and subsequently throughout Russia).

In contrast, in modern times, a defender can improve public relations with a right message: Ukrainian President Volodymyr Zelenskyy's popularity was suffering after years of his presidency, but during the Russian invasion of Ukraine in 2022 his popularity improved dramatically, while Putin's image of a calculating strategist was damaged and Russia was growingly being seen as a pariah in the international stage.

== Applications regarding non-state combatants ==
In the 20th and 21st centuries, questions arose regarding the effectiveness of the invasion strategy in neutralizing non-state combatants, a type of warfare sometimes referred to as "fourth generation warfare". In this case, one or more combatant groups are controlled not by a centralized state government but by independent leadership, and these groups may be made up of civilians, foreign agents, mercenaries, politicians, religious leaders, and members of the regular military. These groups act in smaller numbers, are not confined by borders, and do not necessarily depend on the direct support of the state. Groups such as these are not easily defeated by straightforward invasion, or even constant occupation; the country's regular army may be defeated, the government may be replaced, but asymmetric warfare on the part of these groups can be continued indefinitely. Because regular armed forces units do not have the flexibility and independence of small covert cells, many believe that the concept of a powerful occupying force actually creates a disadvantage.

An opposing theory holds that, in response to extremist ideology and unjust governments, an invasion can change the government and reeducate the people, making prolonged resistance unlikely and averting future violence. This theory acknowledges that these changes may take time—generations, in some cases—but holds that immediate benefits may still be won by reducing membership in, and choking the supply lines of, these covert cells. Proponents of the invasion strategy in such conflicts maintain the belief that a strong occupying force can still succeed in its goals on a tactical level, building upon numerous small victories, similar to a war of attrition.

Contemporary debate on this issue is still fresh; neither side can claim to know for certain which strategies will ultimately be effective in defeating non-state combatants. Opponents of the invasion strategy point to a lack of examples in which occupying or peacekeeping forces have met with conclusive success. They also cite continuing conflicts such as Northern Ireland, Israel, Chechnya, and Iraq, as well as examples which they claim ultimately proved to be failures, such as Lebanon, and Afghanistan. Supporters of the invasion strategy hold that it is too soon to call those situations failures, and that patience is needed to see the plan through. Some say that the invasions themselves have, in fact, been successful, but that political opponents and the international media skew the facts for sensationalism or political gain.

== Outcomes ==
The outcomes of an invasion may vary according to the objectives of both invaders and defenders, the success of the invasion and the defense, and the presence or absence of an agreed settlement between the warring parties. The most common outcome of a successful invasion is the loss of territory from the defender, generally accompanied by a change in government and often the loss of direct control of that government by the losing faction. This sometimes results in the transformation of that country into a client state, often accompanied by requirements to pay reparations or tribute to the victor. In other cases the results of a successful invasion may simply be a return to the status quo; this can be seen in wars of attrition, when the destruction of personnel and supplies is the main strategic objective, or where a nation previously subdued and currently occupied by an aggressive third party is restored to control of its own affairs (i.e. Western Europe following the Normandy landings in 1944, or Kuwait following the defeat of Iraq in 1991). In some cases, the invasion may be strategically limited to a geographical area, which is carved into a separate state as with the Bangladesh Liberation War in 1971.

== See also ==
- Aggression
- Combat
- Immigrant invasion
- Invasion literature
- List of invasions
- Power projection
- Sovereignty
- Trespass
