= María Pilar López de Maturana Ortiz de Zárate =

Blessed María Pilar López de Maturana Ortiz de Zarate
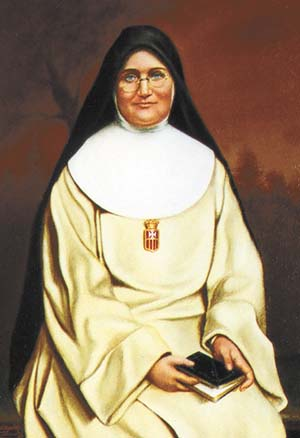

Religious
- Born: 25 July 1884; Bilbao, Vizcaya, Kingdom of Spain
- Died: 23 July 1934 (aged 49); Bérriz, Vizcaya, Second Spanish Republic
- Venerated in: Roman Catholic Church
- Beatified: 22 October 2006, Bilbao Cathedral, Bilbao, Spain by Cardinal José Saraiva Martins
- Feast: 23 July
- Attributes: Religious habit
- Patronage: Mercedarian Missionaries of Bérriz; Missionaries; Against stomach cancer

Blessed María Pilar López de Maturana Ortiz de Zárate (25 July 1884 – 23 July 1934), also known by her religious name Margarita María, was a Spanish Roman Catholic professed religious and the founder of the Mercedarian Missionaries of Bérriz. The religious made several international trips in order to serve in the missions as her order often dabbled in and undertook these trips despite a serious ulcer that transcended into stomach cancer but nevertheless she continued to promote the charism of the missions.

The beatification cause commenced on 25 October 1961 under Pope John XXIII in which she was titled as a Servant of God while Pope John Paul II later named her as Venerable on 16 March 1987. Pope Benedict XVI approved her beatification and it was celebrated on 22 October 2006 in which Cardinal José Saraiva Martins presided on the pope's behalf. Her twin sister Leonor was named as Venerable on the path to sainthood.

== Life ==
María Pilar López de Maturana Ortiz de Zarate was born in 1884 in Bilbao as a twin – her twin sister was Leonor (1884–1931) – and the last of five children to Vicente López de Maturana and Juana Ortiz de Zárate. She was born on the third floor of a building at 52 Tenderia Street. Her twin sister later became a member of the Carmelite order.

On 10 August 1903 she entered the novitiate with the Mercedarians at the convent of Vera Cruz and assumed the religious name of "Margarita María". She would later teach and serve as a principal though suspended this for a brief period in 1922 when she developed a duodenal ulcer that would continue to plague her for the remainder of her life. In September 1924 the order's house where she was stationed in requested the Superior General of the order to establish a group that would prepare and collaborate with missionaries since Sister Margarita María was fond of them and herself wanted to go to the missions. On 23 January 1926 she was granted approval for an experimental move to the missions and on 5 November 1926 a group reached Wuhu in China while another on 4 March 1928 reached Saipan in the Northern Mariana Islands.

The nun was later named as the superior of her house on 16 April 1927 while on 11 November 1928 she arrived in Saipan in the Northern Mariana Islands on her first ever trip to the missions. On 17 May 1930 she received approval to establish a religious order based in Bérriz at the house and on 30 July 1931 founded it as the first superior general - she served as such for the remainder of her life. She made two more trips to the South Pacific but an ulcer led to stomach cancer and she was forced to return home to recuperate.

Her death came due to stomach cancer at 12:15am on 23 July 1934. She had previously had an operation in the week of her death.

== Beatification ==
The beatification cause opened in two competent forums being Vitoria and Bilbao and it first started in an informative process that was inaugurated in 1943 and later closed in 1950 while a second process was held in Madrid in 1950. Her cause was formally opened in Rome on 7 July 1950, granting her the title of Servant of God. Theologians approved all of her spiritual writings on 4 May 1954 in order to ensure they remained in line with doctrine. An apostolic process was later held in Bilbao from 1965 to 1968 while another was held in Guadalajara from 1967 until 1968; the Congregation for the Causes of Saints validated all of these processes in Rome on 9 February 1973 while later receiving the Positio in 1981.

The theologians approved the cause on 16 December 1986 as did the C.C.S. on 3 March 1987 which allowed for Pope John Paul II to approve the fact that she had lived a model life of heroic virtue and so named her as Venerable on 16 March 1987. The miracle needed for beatification was investigated and later validated on 12 April 2002 while a medical board approved it on 15 October 2003 as did theologians on 24 February 2004; the C.C.S. also approved it favorably on 15 November 2005 which allowed for Pope Benedict XVI to approve it definitively on 28 April 2006.

Cardinal José Saraiva Martins – in the name of the pope – beatified the late religious in Bilbao on 22 October 2006.

The current postulator assigned to the cause is the Rev. Antonio Sáez de Albéniz.
