= Pia Maria Wieninger =

Austrian politician (born 1982)

Member of the Municipal Council and Landtag of Vienna
- Incumbent
- Assumed office 24 November 2020
- Constituency: Donaustadt

Personal details
- Born: 23 July 1982 (age 44) Vienna, Austria
- Party: Social Democratic Party
- Education: University of Vienna

Pia Maria Wieninger (born 23 July 1982) is an Austrian politician and member of the Municipal Council and Landtag of Vienna. A member of the Social Democratic Party, she has represented Donaustadt since November 2020.

Wieninger was born on 23 July 1982 in Vienna. She studied abroad in San Cristóbal, Táchira, Venezuela (2000–2001) and at the University of Oslo for a semester in 2006 on the Erasmus Programme. She has a degrees in political science (2008) and cultural and social anthropology (2009) from the University of Vienna. She supervised the Austrian pavilion at Expo 2008 in Zaragoza, Spain. In 2009 she was a political science speaker at schools in Germany for the Museum for Social and Economic Affairs. She has worked in the labour market section of the Ministry of Labour and its predecessors since 2009.

Wieninger has held various positions in the Viennese branch of the Social Democratic Party (SPÖ) and its youth wing Young Generation since 2010. She was elected to the Municipal Council and Landtag of Vienna at the 2020 state election.

Electoral history of Pia Maria Wieninger
Election	Electoral district	Party	Votes	%	Result
2020 state	Donaustadt	Social Democratic Party	104	0.28%	Elected
