= Huang Lü =

Chinese optics scientist

Huang Lü (fl. 1769–1829) was a Chinese scientist and the first woman in the country to work with optics and photographic images. Her father, an education officer, Huang Chao, encouraged her to acquire an education, leading her to study astronomy and arithmetic. During these years, she became acquainted with Zheng Fuguang, who studied Western optics, which had been introduced in China then. She is known for constructing a type of telescope, a camera prototype, and a thermometer.

Chen Wenshu (1775–1845) described her as "an extremely talented woman in every aspect of art and technology" in his poem "Tianjing ge Yong Huang Yingqin".

== See also ==
- Timeline of women in science
