= Typographer (typewriter) =

America's first typewriter

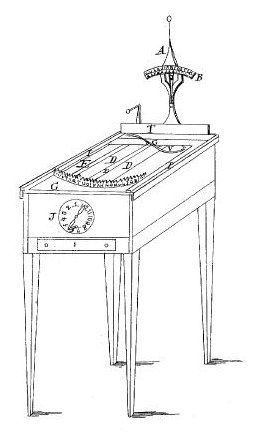
Typographer patent by William Austin Burt, 1829

The typographer was an early typewriter invented by William Austin Burt. Intended to aid in office work, the machine worked by using a lever to press characters onto paper one at a time. It was the first typewriting machine to be patented in the United States, although Pellegrino Turri had made one in Italy in 1808. Perhaps because of its slow speed, or because there was not yet a wide market for typewriters, it was not a commercial success.

The working model that Burt constructed for his 1829 patent was destroyed in the 1836 Patent Office fire.
