= William Austin Burt =

American politician (1792–1858)

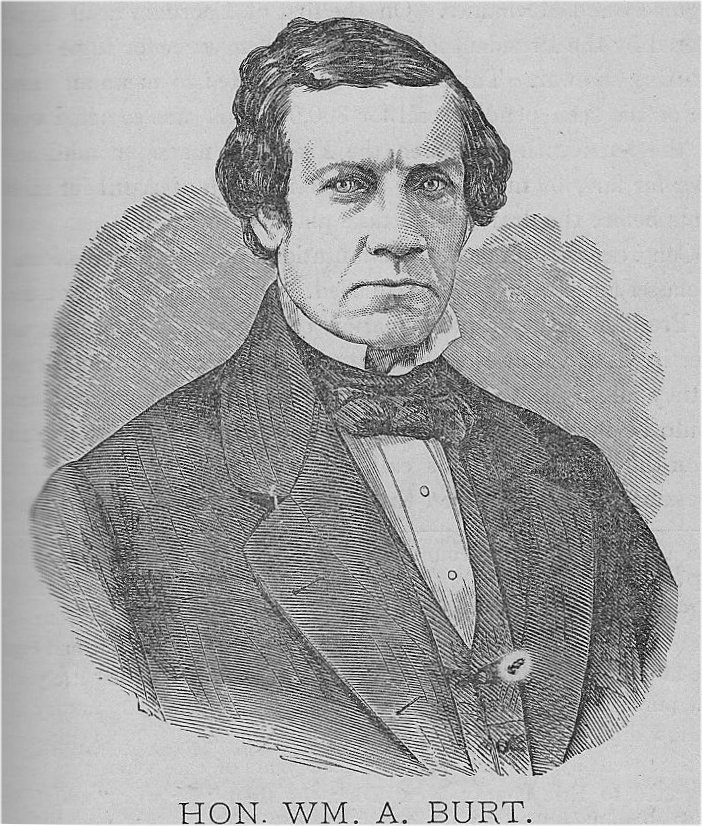
- sketch, before 1873
- Born: William Austin Burt; June 13, 1792; Petersham, Massachusetts, U.S.
- Died: August 18, 1858 (aged 66); Detroit, Michigan, U.S.
- Resting place: Elmwood Cemetery, Detroit, Michigan, U.S.
- Occupation: Surveyor
- Employer: United States government
- Known for: Inventor; government surveyor
- Title: Hon. Wm. A. Burt
- Political party: Jeffersonian Republican
- Spouse: Phoebe Cole
- Children: 5 sons

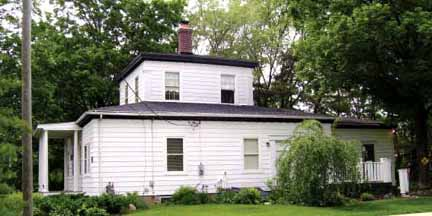
The "wedding cake house" in Washington Township, Michigan

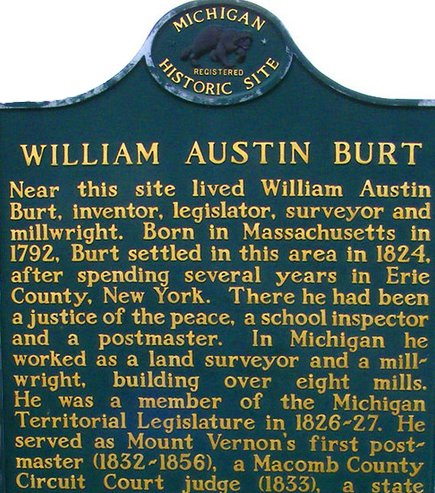
Historic plaque

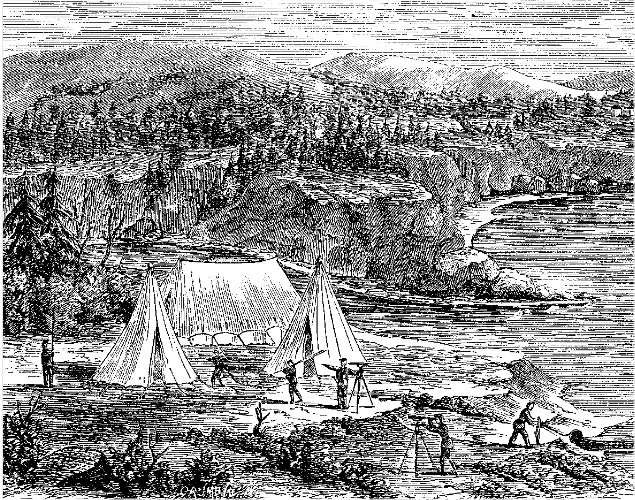
Surveying crew at Marquette

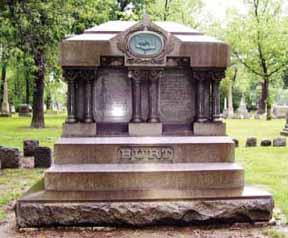
Burt at Elmwood Cemetery, Detroit

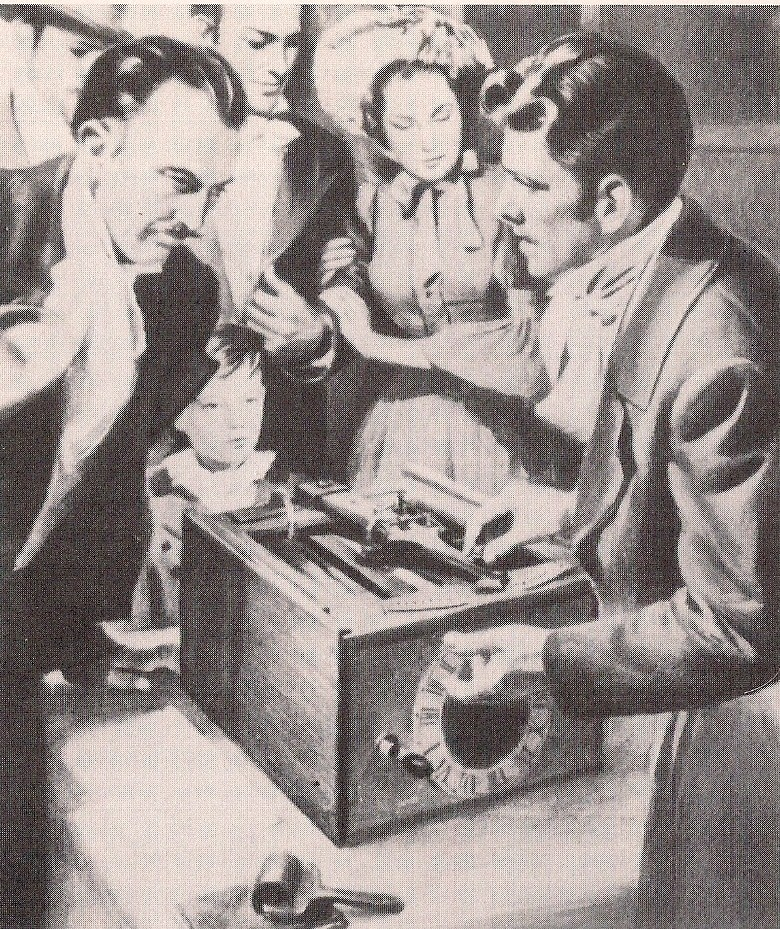
Letter selector and the printing hammer

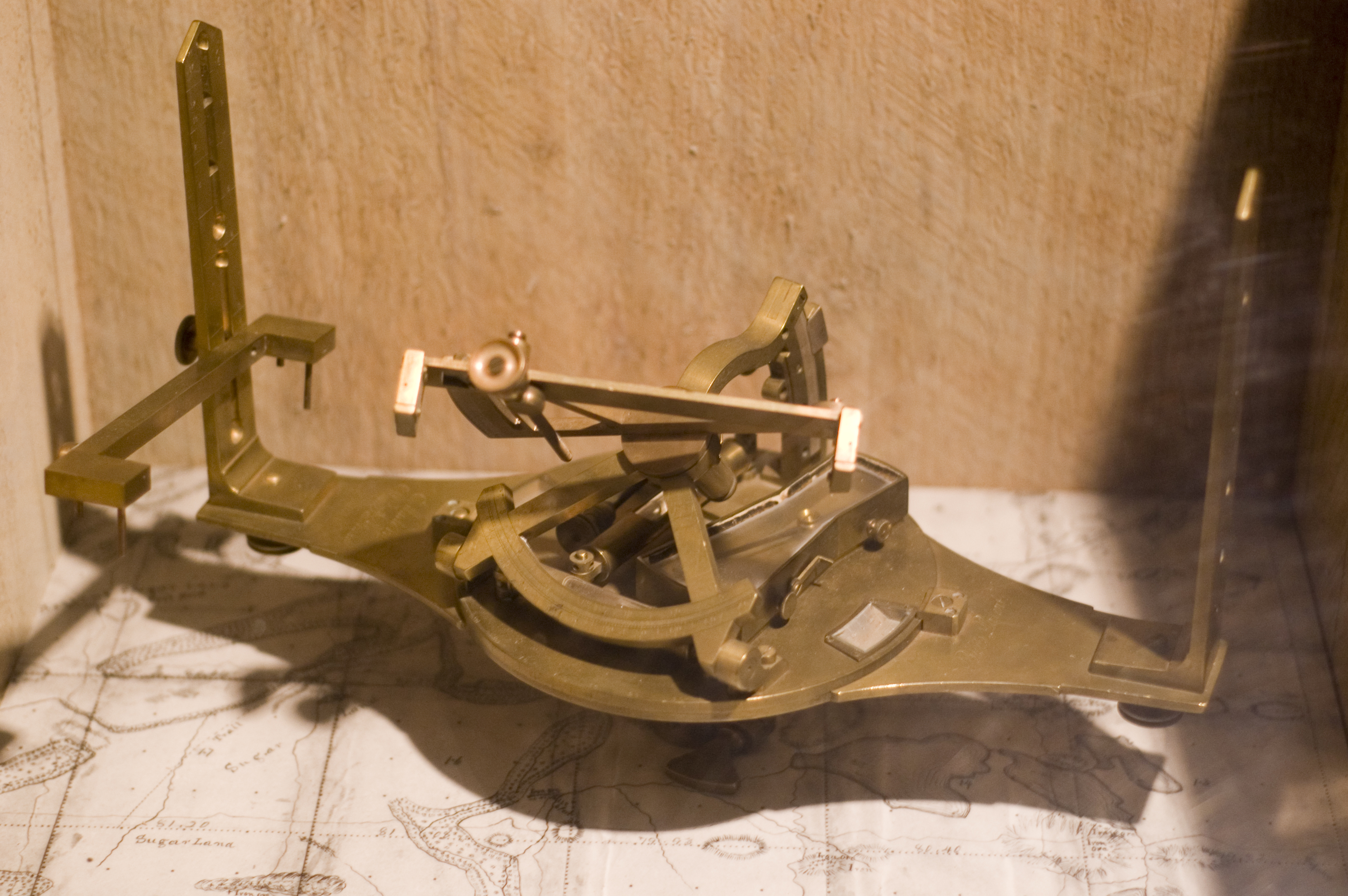
Solar compass

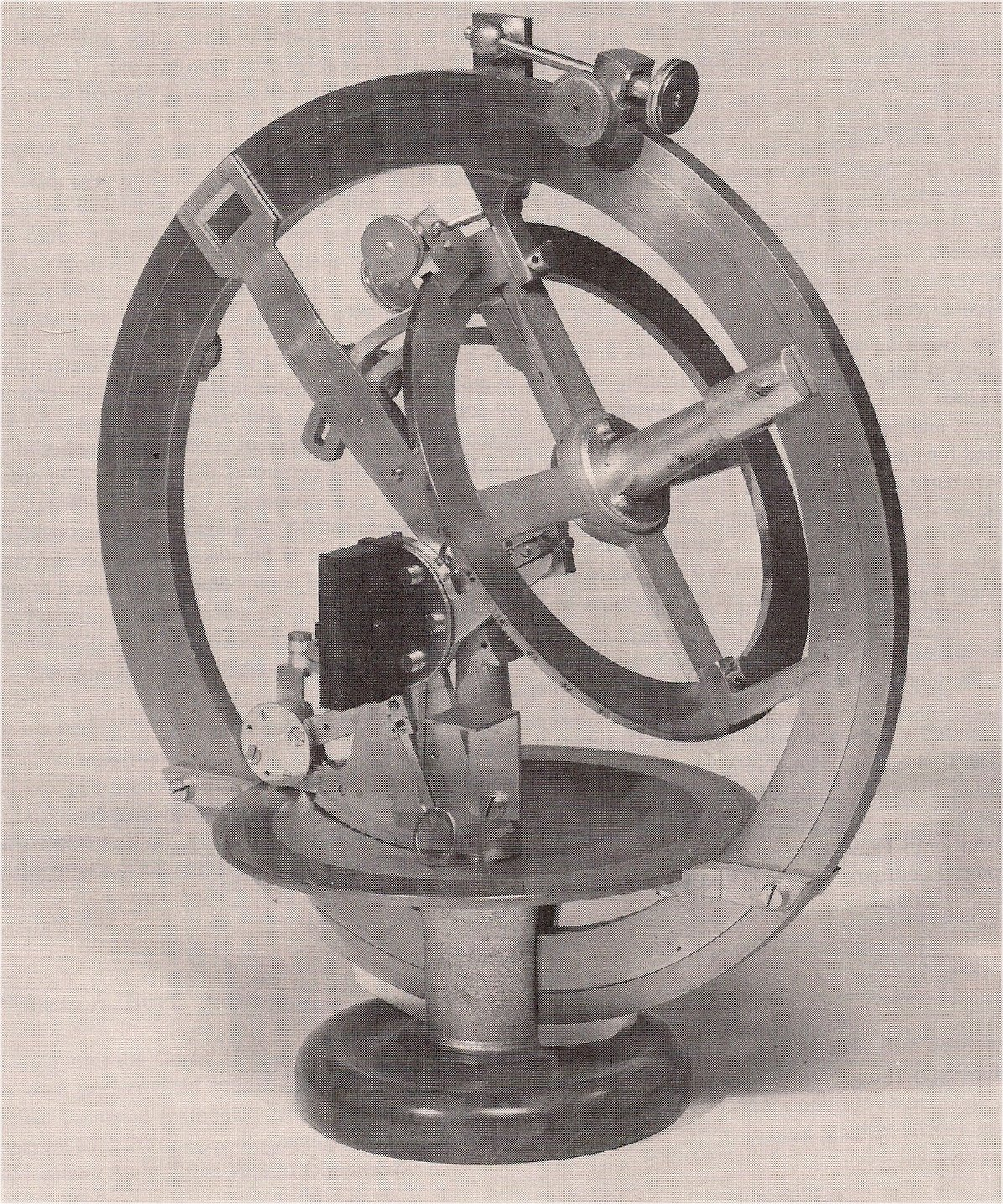
Equatorial sextant

William Austin Burt (June 13, 1792 – August 18, 1858) was an American inventor, legislator, surveyor, and millwright.

Burt was born in Worcester, Massachusetts, and lived in Michigan from 1822 until his death in 1858. He was a member of the Michigan Territorial Legislature, 1826–7. He served as Mount Vernon's first postmaster from 1832 to 1856. He was a Macomb County Circuit Court judge in 1833, a state legislator in 1853, and a deputy U.S. surveyor from 1833 to 1853. While surveying, he won acclaim for his accurate work on public land surveys. In 1857, Burt moved to Detroit, where he died a year later.

Among Burt's numerous inventions were the typographer in 1829, which was a predecessor to the typewriter. He also invented the solar compass, a surveying tool used in the Michigan Survey, employed in regions which had an abundance of minerals that would interfere with accurate readings when using ordinary instruments. While out surveying on September 19, 1844, in what is today Marquette County, Michigan, Burt discovered one of the largest iron ore deposits in the United States. His solar compass and adaptations of it became standard instruments for the government land survey in much of the western US, and were used until GPS was available in the late 20th century. A historical plaque commemorates Burt at Stony Creek, near his home in Mount Vernon, Michigan.

He was awarded the John Scott Medal by The Franklin Institute in 1834.

== Sources ==
- Adler, Michael H. (1973). The Writing Machine: A History of the Typewriter. George Allen & Unwin. ISBN 0-04-652004-X.
- Bingham, Stephen (1924). Michigan Biographies. Michigan Historical Commission.
- Bonior, David E. (2001). Walking to Mackinac. University of Michigan Press. ISBN 978-0472-08797-6.
- Cutter, William Richard (1913). New England Family Genealogical and Memorial. Lewis Historical Publishing.
- Fuller, George Newman (1922). Michigan History. Vol. 6. Michigan Department of State. OCLC 983255566.
- Hannan, Caryn (2008). Michigan Encyclopedia. State History Publications. ISBN 978-1878592941.
- Kidder, Harry M. (1920). Transactions of New York Shorthand Reporters of December 28, 1920. Boyd Printing. OCLC 7772514.
- Smart, Charles E. (1962). The Makers of Surveying Instruments in America Since 1700 (PDF). Martino Publishing. ISBN 978-15789-8488-6.
- Traver, Robert (2014). Laughing Whitefish. Michigan State University Press. ISBN 978-16091-7219-0.
- Tuttle, Charles Richard (1873). General History of Michigan Biographical Sketches. R. D. S. Tyler & Company. ISBN 978-1425569792. OCLC 646929780.
- Vrooman, John Wright (1923). The Story of the Typewriter, 1873–1923. Press of A. H. Kellogg Company. ISBN 978-0598711168. OCLC 936927259.
- University of Michigan, Board of Regents (1906). Proceedings of Board of Regents. University of Michigan. OCLC 904199723.
- White, James T. (1922). Cyclopedia of American Biography. Vol. 18. J. T. White. OCLC 164589128.
