= HMS Pickle =

Eight ships of the Royal Navy have been named HMS Pickle:

- The first HMS Pickle (1800) was a 10-gun topsail schooner purchased in 1800, originally named Sting, and renamed in 1802. She was present at the Battle of Trafalgar in 1805 (but too small to play a part in the battle itself), under the command of John Richards Lapenotiere, who was entrusted with conveying the message about the victory and the death of Lord Nelson to England. She landed in Falmouth, Cornwall, setting Lapenotiere on his historic 36-hour journey by post chaise to the Admiralty in London. The route he took was inaugurated as The Trafalgar Way in 2005. She was wrecked in 1808 off Cádiz.
- The second Pickle was the 12-gun schooner Eclair, originally French, that Garland, a tender to Daphne, captured in 1801. Eclair was renamed Pickle in 1809 and sold in 1818.
- The third Pickle was a schooner of 5 guns, launched in 1827. She was involved in the suppression of the slave trade, and achieved fame for capturing the armed slave ship Voladora off the coast of Cuba on 5 June 1829. She was broken up in 1847.
- The fourth Pickle was originally the slave-trading brig Eolo, captured in 1852 by HMS Orestes.
- The fifth Pickle was a mortar vessel launched in 1855 and broken up in 1865.
- The sixth Pickle was an Albacore-class wooden screw gunboat launched in 1856 and broken up in 1864.
- The seventh Pickle was an Ant-class iron screw gunboat launched in 1872.
- The eighth HMS Pickle (J293) was an Algerine-class minesweeper launched in 1943. She was transferred to the navy of Ceylon in 1959 and renamed Parakarama.
