= Ioannis Notaras =

Greek general of the Greek War of Independence

- Ιωάννης Νοταράς
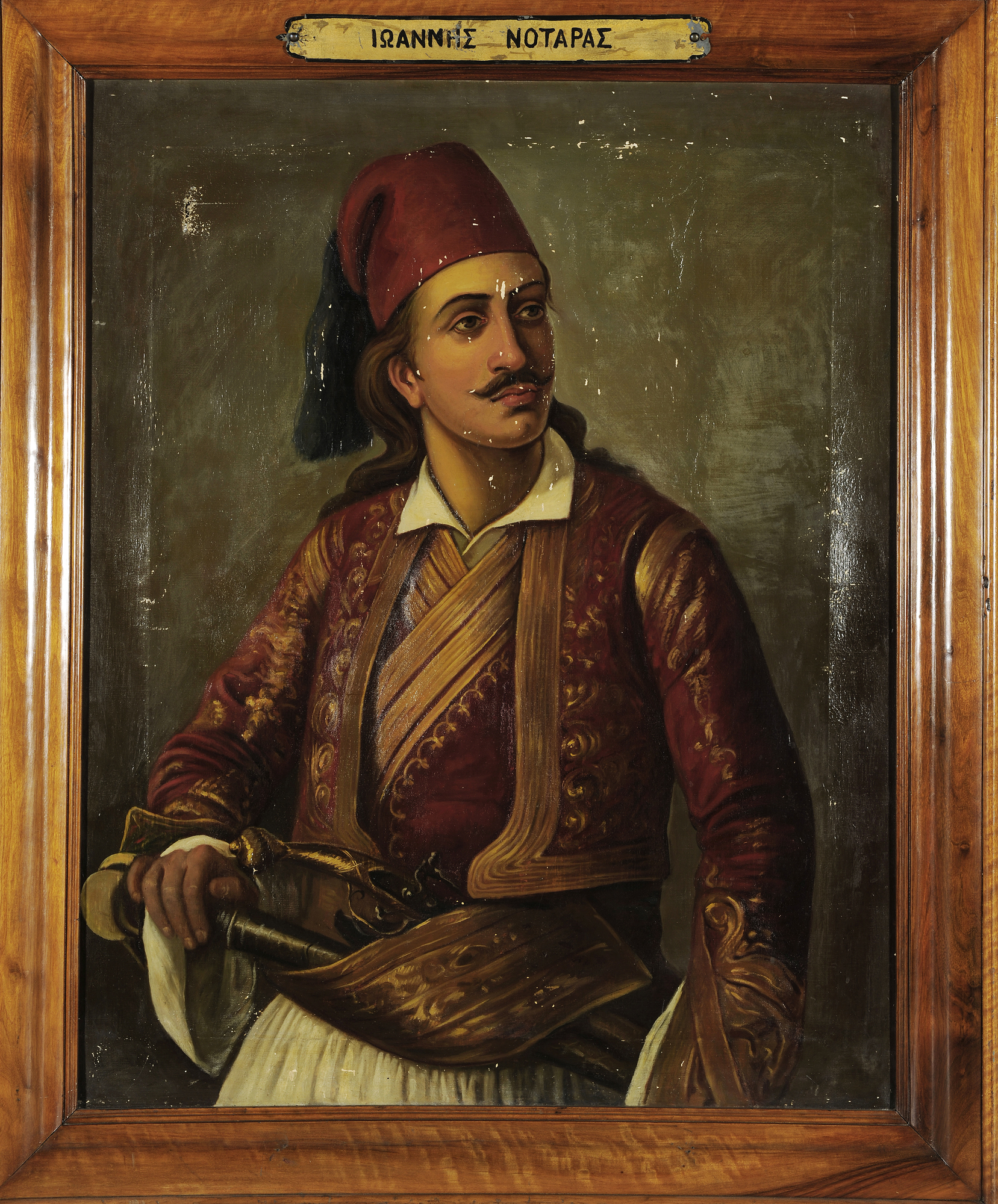
- A portrait of Ioannis Notaras; National Historical Museum of Greece
- Born: 1805; Trikala, Morea Eyalet, Ottoman Empire (now Greece)
- Died: 24 April 1827 (aged 21–22); Phaleron, Sanjak of Eğriboz, Ottoman Empire (now Greece)
- Relatives: Panagiotis Notaras (cousin)
- Military career
- Allegiance: (Greece) First Hellenic Republic
- Branch: Hellenic Army
- Nicknames: Γιαννάκης (Yiannakis); Αρχοντόπουλο (lord's son)
- Conflicts: Greek War of Independence: Greek Civil Wars; Battle of Kastella; Battle of Phaleron †

Ioannis or Giannakis Notaras (Greek: Ἰωάννης (Γιαννάκης) Νοταρᾶς) was a Greek general of the Greek War of Independence. He was killed in 1827 during the Battle of Phaleron.

== Biographical information ==
He was born in 1805 at Trikala, Corinthia, and belonged to an important Notaras magnate family from Corinthia. His father was the notable Sotiris Notaras and his mother, Mary, was a sister of Andreas Zaimis. He stood out for his stature and his physical presence and was known to his environment as the "lord's son" (αρχοντόπουλο). He had received basic education and at the beginning of the Greek Revolution, although young, he created his own military force composed of men from the Peloponnese and from Roumeli. He paid the salaries of his fighters from his own fortune.

He participated in the siege of Acrocorinth and after the surrender of the castle, he became garrison commander. In 1822 he fought bravely and he was distinguished in repelling the army of Mahmud Dramali Pasha. In 1824, at the age of 19, he became general of the revolutionary forces. In the first phase of the Greek civil wars of 1824–25, he sided with his uncle, Andreas Zaimis, against the Georgios Kountouriotis government and the government troops from Roumeli. As a result, he was persecuted by Yannis Gouras and abandoned by his men from Roumeli, who were unhappy because they were not paid well. He found shelter in Agios Georgios.

When Kountouriotis prevailed, Notaras was forced to surrender on 9 December 1824. Along with other leaders of the anti-government camp he was imprisoned in Nafplio. According to Fotios Chrysanthopoulos, he was imprisoned on Hydra Island.

After he was released, he constituted his own army and in July 1825 he participated in the second siege of Patras. He also repelled the Egyptian troops of Ibrahim Pasha of Egypt in the region of Messenia. In 1826, he became the cause of civil conflict in Corinth as a rival of his cousin Panagiotis Notaras for the hand of Sofia Rendi, daughter of the notable Theocharis Rendis. The result of this turmoil was the total destruction of the village of Sofiko in May 1826. In late January 1827 as the head of 1200 soldiers, he proceeded to Attica, where under the leadership of Georgios Karaiskakis and the British philhellene Thomas Gordon, he took part in the battles against the army of Mehmed Reshid Pasha, including the Battle of Kastella with Yannis Makriyannis and Dimitrios Kallergis. In this battle, he commanded the center of the Greek forces.

He was killed during the disastrous defeat of the revolutionary forces Battle of Phaleron on 24 April 1827.

== Bibliography ==
- Fotios Chrysanthopoulos, ed. (1888) (Greek). Βίοι Πελοποννησίων ανδρών και των εξώθεν εις την Πελοπόννησον ελθόντων κληρικών, στρατιωτικών και πολιτικών των αγωνισαμένων τον αγώνα της επαναστάσεως. Athens: Σταύρος Ανδρόπουλος, Τυπογραφείο Π. Δ. Σακελλαρίου.
- Papyrus Larousse Britannica, vol. 39, p. 295-296, Athens: 2007 (Greek).
