= Thomas Gordon (British Army officer) =

British army officer & historian (1788–1841)

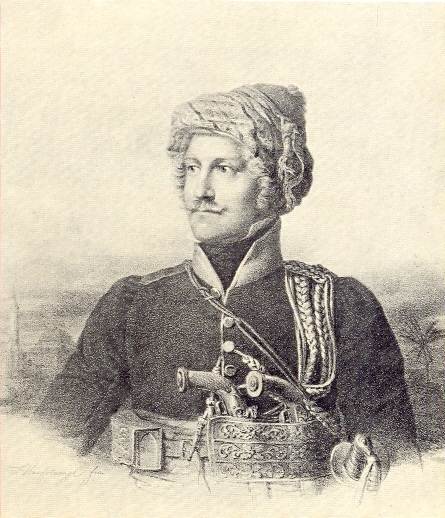
- Portrait of Gordon
- Born: c. 1788; Cairness House, Aberdeenshire
- Died: 20 April 1841 Cairness House, Aberdeenshire
- Allegiance: United Kingdom; First Hellenic Republic; Kingdom of Greece
- Branch: British Army; Hellenic Army
- Rank: Colonel (Hellenic Army)
- Conflicts: Greek War of Independence; Siege of Tripolitsa; Battle of Kastella
- Awards: Grand Commander of the Order of the Redeemer

Major-General Thomas Gordon (1788 – 20 April 1841) was a British army officer and historian. He is remembered for his role in the Greek War of Independence in the 1820s and 1830s and his History of the war published in 1832.

== Early career ==
He was born at Cairness House to Charles Gordon of Buthlaw and Cairness in Lonmay, Aberdeenshire and his wife Christian, née Forbes of Ballogie. He was educated at Eton College and Brasenose College, Oxford.

From 1808 to 1810 he served in the Scots Greys. In May 1810 he left service in the British Army for travel and on 26 August was well received in Ioannina by Ali Pasha, local governor for the Ottoman Empire. Between 1810 and 1812, his travels included Athens, Constantinople, Thessaloniki as well as parts of Anatolia, Persia and Barbary.

In 1813, he served as a captain on the staff of the Russian Army, and in November 1813 was in the army of Count von Walmoden at Pretzer in Mecklenburg. Early in 1814, he returned to his seat of Cairness House until 1815 when he went abroad again to Constantinople, where he married Barbara Kana (afterwards Baroness de Sedaiges).

== Military service in Greece during the 1820s ==
Gordon returned to Greece in 1821 at the commencement of the Greek War of Independence. He served through the campaign of 1821 in Morea (the Peloponnese) as chef d’état major under Demetrios Ypsilantis. He took part in the siege of Tripolitsa. He got seriously ill from plague in November 1821, forcing him to leave Greece.

In November 1822, the provisional Greek government at Hermione sent a letter asking him to return to them. He declined, believing that he was not yet ready to return, but joined the Greek committee in London (formed 8 March 1823) and contributed money and military supplies. Although he was close to accepting, he ultimately refused the committee's invitation to go to Greece as one of three commissioners in charge of stores and funds, because of what he saw as military indiscipline on the Greek side and political developments, including the Greek civil wars and the fall of Alexandros Mavrokordatos. Nevertheless, he stayed committed to the Greek cause and, as a committee member, he strongly supported the appointment of George Byron, 6th Baron Byron.

Early in 1824, a Greek deputation raised a loan in London and again asked Gordon to return; Gordon declined, again because of the ongoing civil wars. In 1826, renewed representations from Greece and the Greek deputies in London persuaded him to return to promote unity and military discipline. This time, he accepted. He reached Nafplion in May 1826 and found that bitter dissentions among the Greeks had quenched even their animosity against the Turks. He was well received and arrived in time to prevent the disbanding of the regular corps.

Towards the end of June, Rumeliots forced the government to seize $10,000 from Gordon to give to the Souliot Kapetanioi from Epirus. By the end of 1826, Gordon had spent all the public funds which the Greek deputies in London had entrusted to him.

In 1827, Gordon accepted the command of the expedition to Piraeus, with the rank of brigadier, his troops consisting of the corps of Ioannis Notaras, that of Ioannis Makrygiannis, the regulars, and the foreign volunteers. His aim was to relieve Athens, which was being blockaded. Gordon successfully landed his troops at Faliro "under the nose of Reshid Pasha”.

Having found that the Greeks besieged in the Acropolis were still able to hold out, Gordon wished to resign and only continued on condition of receiving supplies and being "entirely master of his own operations". He remained in command of the troops at Faliro until the arrival in April of General Richard Church, who took over the supreme command.

On 16 April 1827, Church appointed Gordon director-general of the army. He probably continued to serve in this capacity until the Greek defeat of 6 May. Nevertheless, continued resistance, the success of the Battle of Navarino, and the backing of France, the Russian Empire and the United Kingdom of Great Britain and Ireland enabled the First Hellenic Republic to emerge with a northern frontier from Arta to Volos, but without Crete or Samos. In July 1827, Gordon returned to Scotland.

== Archaeological and historical interests in Greece ==
Gordon returned to Greece in 1828. While at Argos from 1828 to 1831 with his secretary James Robertson and the historian George Finlay, he worked on the site of the ruined Heraeum near Argos. Archaeological plans also included a proposal to form a joint stock company for the purchase of Epidaurus. Finlay also suggested that he might be president of the Greek national assembly, but Gordon had no such ambitions.

While at Argos, Gordon collected both written and oral material for a history of the Greek revolution. He also built a magnificent mansion which was modelled on Cairness House although smaller. He returned to Cairness in 1831 and completed his book in 1832. It was acclaimed for its detail and accuracy.

== Last military role in Greece ==
With the arrival of Prince Otto of Wittelsbach as the new King of Greece, Gordon returned to Greece in 1833 and was commissioned colonel in the Hellenic Army. His campaigns that year included rooting out brigands in Aetolia and Acarnania, who were supported by Turks across the border. Gordon spoke the Turkish language fluently, to the astonishment of local pashas, and this was of considerable value in negotiations. He was also appointed the president of the military court set up to try the rebels in the Messenian disturbances.

Due to poor health, Gordon resigned his commission in February 1839 and returned to Cairness, although he made another short visit to Greece in 1840.

== Death and controversy ==
Gordon died at Cairness and was survived by his wife. He had no issue with her and in his will left most of his estate, including a large slave plantation in Jamaica, to an illegitimate son called James Wilkinson, who later took the surname Gordon. His existence seems to have been a secret from the rest of the family as he had been brought up by a tutor in Elgin. The inheritance caused much scandal and led to a long period of litigation within the family. Thomas Gordon's historical library and manuscripts were sold in March 1850, and his antiquities in the following June, although some items remained at Cairness House until 1938, after the last of the Gordons sold the estate.

== Honours ==
Gordon was awarded various honours, including being made Grand Commander of the Order of the Redeemer by the Greeks on his retirement. He was a member of many learned societies including the Royal Society (1821), the Society of Antiquaries of Scotland (1828), and the Royal Asiatic Society (1834), and in Greece the Society for Natural History (1837) and the Archaeological Society (1840).

== Bibliography ==
- D. Dakin, British and American philhellenes during the War of Greek Independence, 1821-1833 (1955)
- Stephen, Leslie; Lee, Sidney, eds. (1890). "Gordon, Thomas (1788-1841)" . Dictionary of National Biography. Vol. 22. London: Smith, Elder & Co.
- William St. Clair, That Greece might still be free: The Pilhellenes in the War of Independence, London 1972
- A. E. Kasdagli, 'The papers of Thomas Gordon of Cairness (1788-1841)’, Northern Scotland, 14 (1994), pp109–114
- A. E. Kasdagli, 'Exploring the papers of the Scottish philhellene Thomas Gordon (1788-1841)’, Kambos, Cambridge Papers in Modern Greek, 3 (1995): 45–69.
- J. A. Petropulos, Politics and Statecraft in the kingdom of Greece 1833-1843 (1968)
- Under the Flags of Freedom: British Mercenaries in the War of the Two Brothers, the First Carlist War, and the Greek War of Independence (1821-1840), by Moises Enrique Rodriguez (Lanham, Maryland, 2009).
