= Battle of Kastella =

1827 battle of the Greek War of Independence

- Part of Greek War of Independence
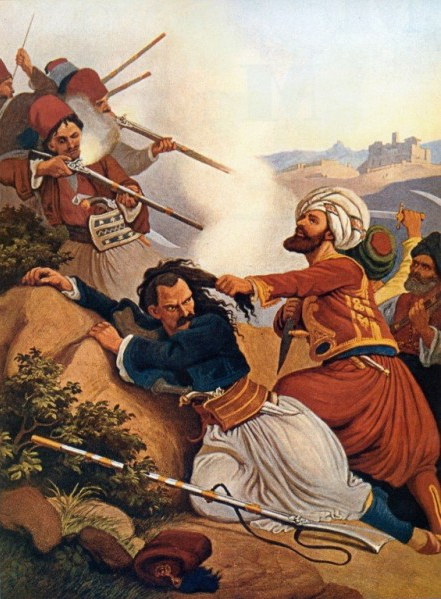
- Yannis Makriyannis defending Piraeus (painting by Peter von Hess)
Date	29 January 1827 – 30 January 1827
Location	Kastella, Piraeus
Result	Greek victory

Belligerents
First Hellenic Republic	Ottoman Empire

Commanders and leaders
Yannis Makriyannis; Ioannis Notaras; Dimitrios Kallergis (United Kingdom) Thomas Gordon	(Ottoman Empire) Reşid Mehmed Pasha

Strength
2,000 Klephts and Αrmatoloi 400 regular army, 15 cannons	About 3,000 (infantry and cavalry) 4–6 cannons

Casualties and losses
60 dead	300 dead and wounded

Battle of Kastella was a military engagement during the Greek revolution of 1821 with a victorious outcome for the Greeks, in the context of Reşid Mehmed Pasha’s expedition in Attica which had as its ultimate goal the occupation of the Acropolis.

== Developments in Roumeli and the landing of the Greeks in Κastella ==
By the end of 1826 and the beginning of 1827, the Greeks, thanks to the winning battles of Karaiskakis, had succeeded in liberating the whole region of Roumeli, except for Messolonghi, Nafpaktos and Vonitsa. However, despite these victories, Mehmet Resi Pasha (Kioutachis) had not finished his expedition, being determined to conquer the Acropolis of Athens. The Greek government, considering that the loss of the Acropolis would entail the loss of the whole region of Central Greece, sent reinforcements to the military camp of Eleusis. After that event, the Greeks camped in Kamatero. There, however, in the homonymous battle, they suffered a severe defeat by Kioutachis, as a result of which 300 Greeks were killed. On 24 January, a group of 2,000 men of irregular army and 400 men of regular army based on Salamis, under the British army officer and later historian Thomas Gordon, landed in Faliro and afterwards headed to the hill of Κastella, where they were fortified. Gordon’s force was supported by the steam-powered warship “Karteria”, under the command of the English captain Frank Abney Hastings, along with three rifles brigs, five gunboats and one ‘mistiko’ boat (a type of vessel used for detection missions and transfers of major figures and important information). The rebels also disposed 15 cannons which were operated by some philhellenes and 50 experienced Psarian gunners. The next day, a part of that group attempted to occupy the monastery of Saint Spyridon but it was repulsed.

== Kioutachis's reaction and the Greeks’ preparations ==
After his victory at Kamatero, Kioutachis had been trying for two days to persuade the besieged on the Acropolis to surrender. Irritated by their refusal, he moved against Gordon’s positions in Kastella, with his forces currently estimated at about 3,000 men (Gordon reports 4,000) and a few cannons.

The Greeks were well prepared for battle with cannons they had raised from their ships, and placed them in the center and to the left of their formation. The right end of the rebels (the coast of Piraeus) which was the weakest, would be covered by shots from ships. Makrygiannis with the Athenians would cover the right end, Dimitris Kallergis the left and in the center were the forces of Ioannis Notaras.

== The battle of Κastella ==
On the night of 29 January, many Greeks, deeply affected by the defeat in Kamatero, were intimidated and began to leave. For this reason, the Greek ships were ordered to leave the coast. According to Makrygiannis, Gordon himself and other officers lost their courage and were about to leave, but the prevailing view was that, if the Turks won, no one would be spared.

On 30 January, Kioutachis's forces marched against the Greek fortifications.

Their raids lasted for five hours but were repulsed by the Greeks, who were greatly helped by Κarteria (“Karteria” was the first steamship ever to take part in naval battles with great success), which was suffering enough damage from the enemy artillery, in order to be forced out of the port of Piraeus. During the retreat of the Turks, a few Greeks of the regular army, along with 250 Athenians under Makrygiannis, chased them causing them heavy losses. The Greek casualties were 60 men dead whereas the Turks had 300 dead and wounded.

The battle of Kastella was followed by the battle of the Three Towers, on February 20, where the Greeks under Gordon won again, but they were unable to relieve the besieged of the Acropolis.

== Bibliography ==
- Dionysios Kokkinos, Η Ελληνική Επανάστασις, τόμος 5ος, σελ. 594, 597. Αθήνα: Μέλισσα. 1974.
- History of the Greek Nation, Volume XII: The Greek Revolution (1821 - 1832), Athens: Publications of Athens, 1975
