= Trikala (disambiguation) =

Trikala (Greek: Τρίκαλα) may refer to one of the following places in Greece:

- Trikala, capital of the Trikala regional unit
- Trikala (constituency), electoral district
- Trikala, Corinthia, a village in western Corinthia, in the municipal unit of Xylokastro
- Trikala, Imathia, a village in the eastern part of Imathia
- Trikala, an alternative name for the ancient Sicilian town of Triocala

== See also ==
- Trikal, a 1985 Indian film by Shyam Benegal
