= Siege of the Acropolis (1826–1827) =

Battle of the Greek Revolution

Second siege of the Acropolis
- Part of the Greek War of Independence
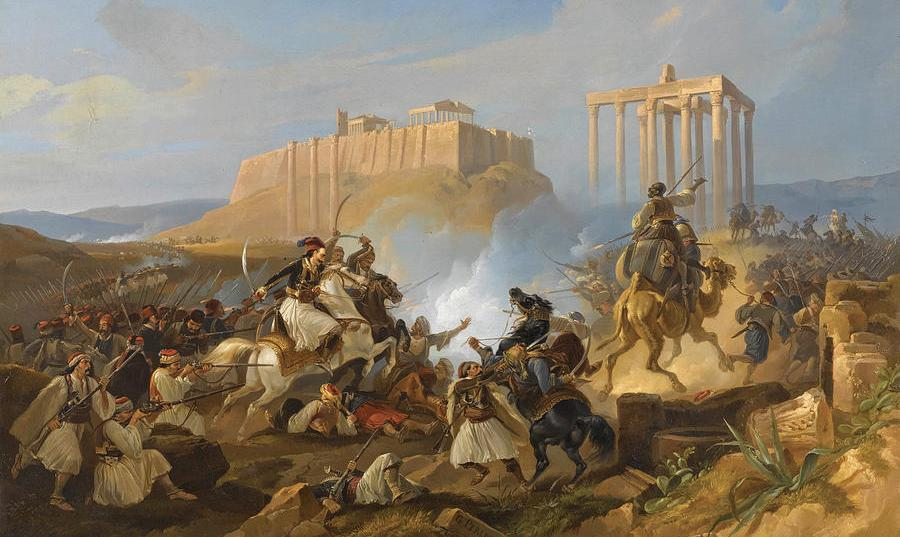
- Siege of the Acropolis by Georg Perlberg
| Date | 25 August 1826 – 24 May 1827 (O.S.) (8 months, 4 weeks and 1 day) |
| Location | Athens, Sanjak of Eğriboz, Ottoman Empire (now Attica, Greece) 37°58′46″N 23°42′58″E |
| Result | Ottoman victory; Capture of the Acropolis |

Belligerents
| (Greece) First Hellenic Republic | Ottoman Empire |

Commanders and leaders
| Georgios Karaiskakis †; Yiannis Gouras †; Lord Cochrane; Yiannis Makriyiannis; Charles Nicolas Fabvier; Vasos Mavrovouniotis | Reşid Mehmed Pasha |

Strength
| 6,000 | 10,000 |

Casualties and losses
| Unknown | Unknown |
- Location within Athens Siege of the Acropolis (1826–1827) (Greece)

The second siege of the Acropolis in 1826–1827 during the Greek War of Independence involved the siege of the Acropolis of Athens, the last fortress still held by the Greek rebels in Central Greece, by the forces of the Ottoman Empire.

== History ==
Following the fall of Missolonghi in western Greece, Athens and the Acropolis remained the only strongholds in Greek hands in mainland Greece outside the Peloponnese. Consequently, after his victory at Missolonghi, the Ottoman commander-in-chief, Reşid Mehmed Pasha, turned against Athens. The siege began at 25 August 1826, and followed closely the experience of Missolonghi: the Ottomans set up a very close blockade and bombarded the hill, while the besieged harassed them with frequent night sorties and mining, utilizing the expertise of Konstantinos Chormivitis, who had already distinguished himself in Missolonghi. The Beleaguered Greeks were resupplied and reinforced by small detachments sent through the Ottoman lines by the main Greek army, under Georgios Karaiskakis, which had established itself around Eleusis, Piraeus and Phaleron to the south of Athens. The Greeks launched various attacks against the Ottoman army's rear and its supply lines, most notably the victory at the Battle of Arachova in November; this strategy was altered in favour of direct attacks on the Ottoman army, resulting in the Battle of Kamatero in February. The command was transferred from Karaiskakis to the British general Richard Church in April.

The Ottoman victory at Phaleron (Analatos) on 24 April (Julian) 1827 ended any possibility for relief, and the Acropolis garrison surrendered a month later.
