= Syntagma Square =

Central square of Athens, Greece

Coordinates: 37°58′32″N 23°44′05″E

Syntagma
- Σύνταγμα
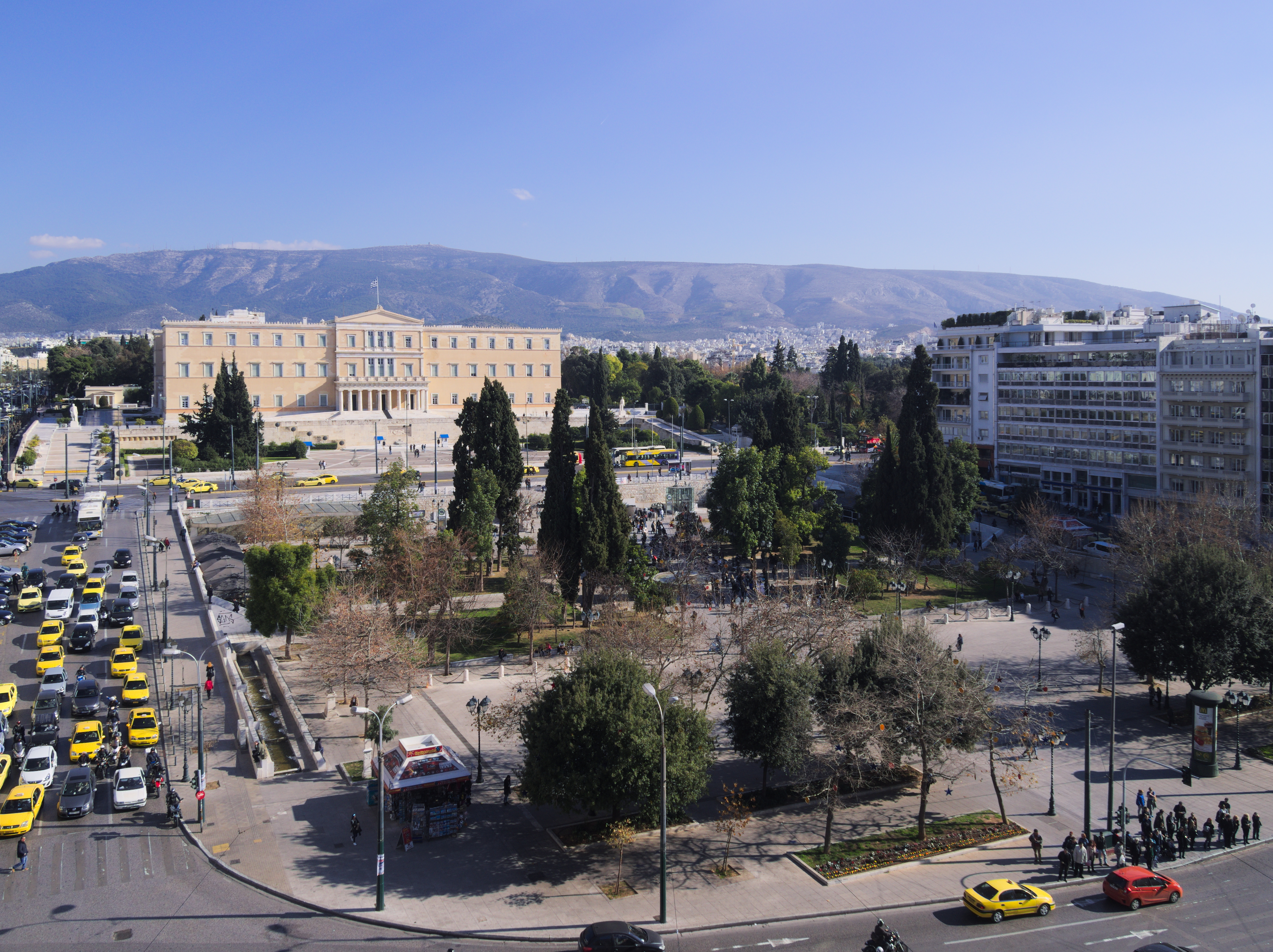
- View of Syntagma Square and the Old Royal Palace from atop the Pallis Mansion
- Location: Athens, Attica, Greece
- Location in the municipality of Athens

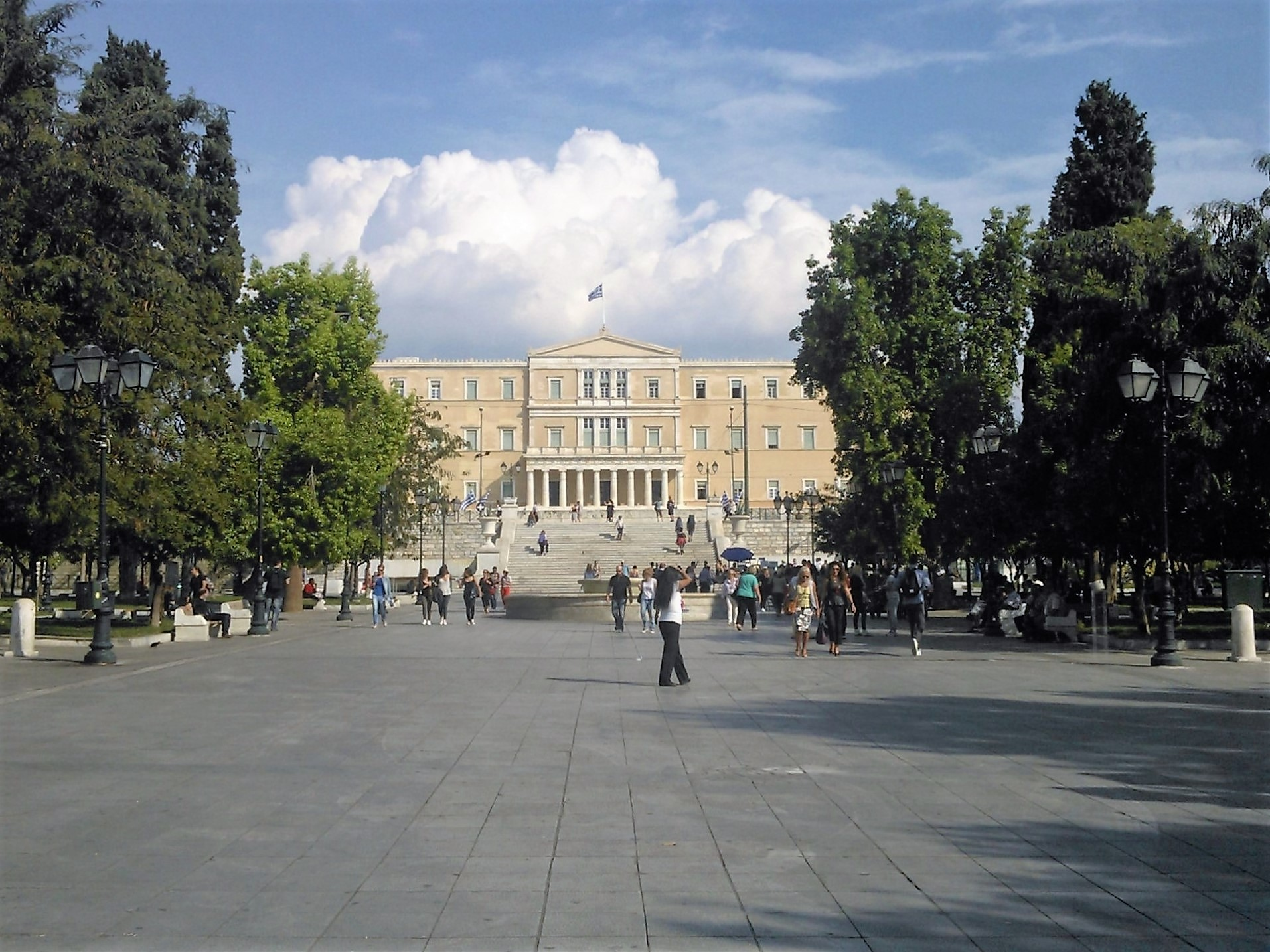
View of Syntagma Square towards the Old Royal Palace

Syntagma Square (Greek: Πλατεία Συντάγματος, pronounced [plaˈtia sinˈdaɣmatos], "Constitution Square") is the central square of Athens, Greece. The square is named after the Constitution that Otto, the first King of Greece, was obliged to grant after a popular and military uprising on 3 September 1843. It is located in front of the 19th-century Old Royal Palace, housing the Greek Parliament since 1934. Syntagma Square is the most important square of modern Athens from both a historical and social point of view, at the heart of commercial activity and Greek politics. The name Syntagma (Greek: Σύνταγμα) alone also refers to the neighbourhood surrounding the square. The metro station underneath the square, where lines 2 and 3 connect, along with the tram terminal and the numerous bus stops, constitutes one of the busiest transport hubs in the country.

== Description ==
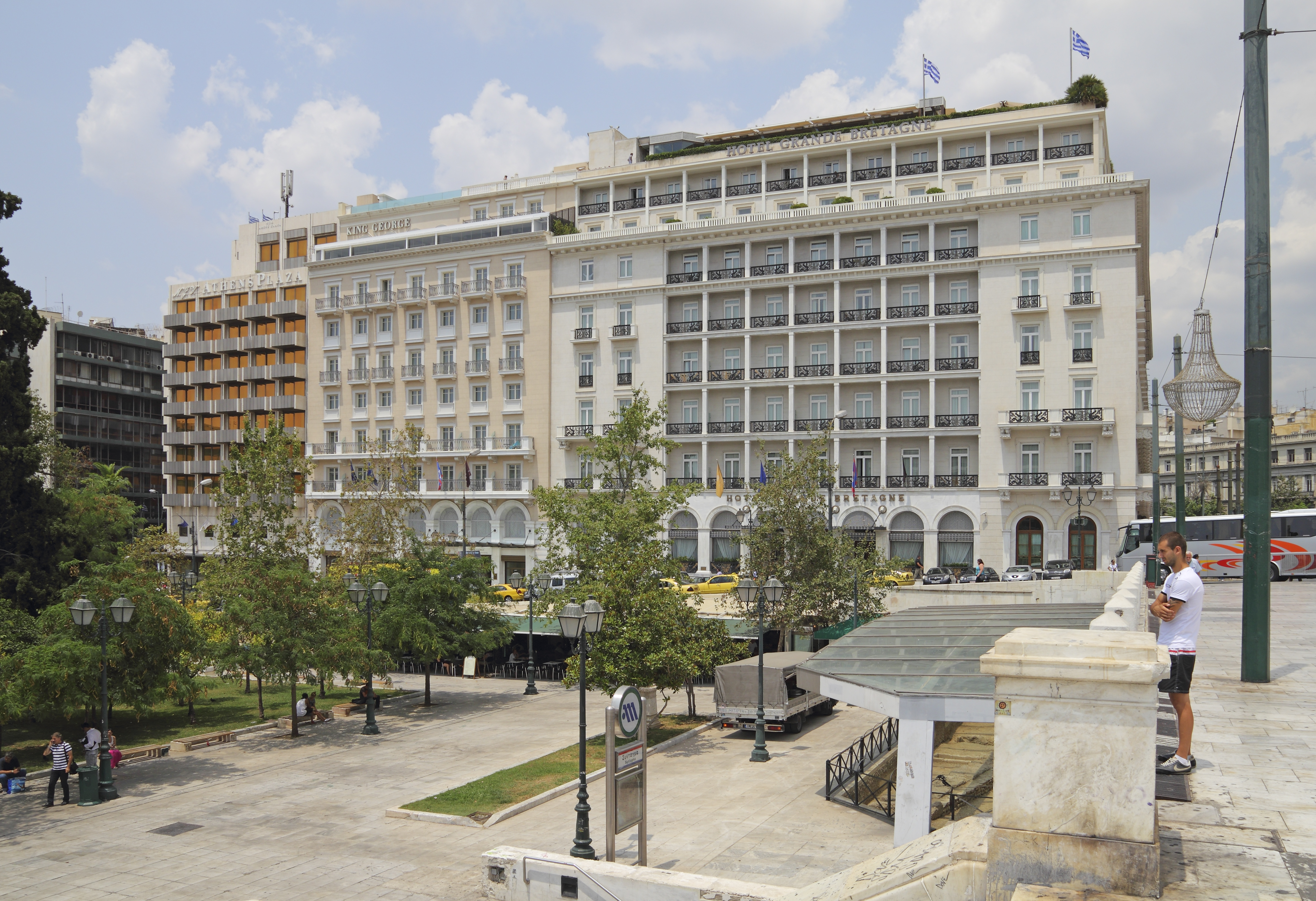
View of the hotels to the north side of the square, along King George I Street

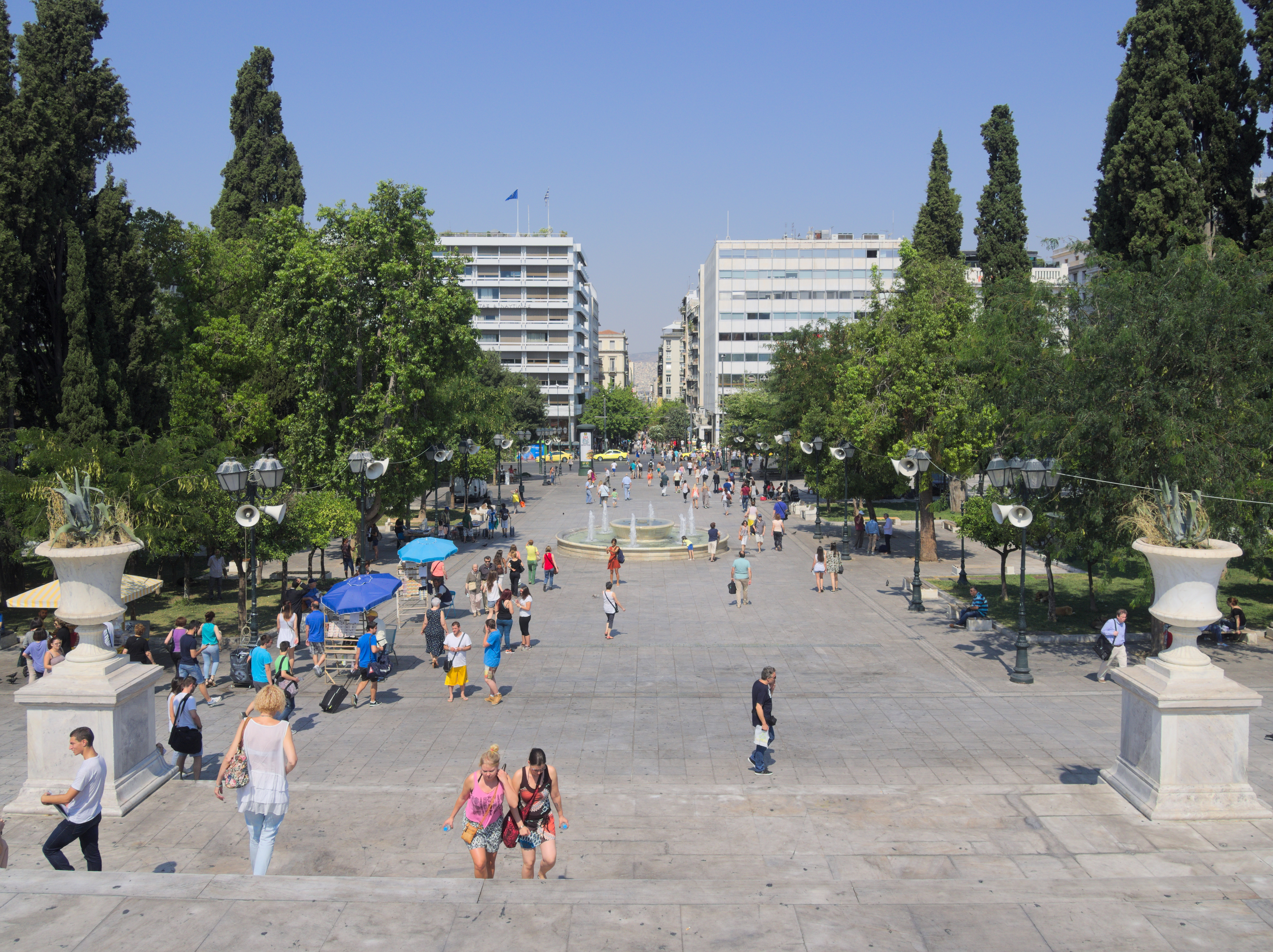
Syntagma Square as seen from Amalias Avenue (east side) in 2015

The square is bordered by Amalia Avenue (Leofóros Amalías) to the east, Otto Street (Óthonos) to the south and King George I Street (Vasiléos Georgíou Prótou) to the north. The street bordering the square to the west, connecting Stadiou Street with Fillelinon Street, is simply named "Syntagma Square" (Plateia Syntágmatos). The eastern side of the square is higher than the western, and dominated by a set of marble steps leading to Amalias Avenue; beneath these lies the Syntagma metro station. The stairs emerge below between a pair of outdoor cafes, and are a popular city-centre gathering place. Syntagma also includes two green areas to the north and south, planted with shade trees, while in the centre of the square there is a large mid-19th century water fountain.

The Old Royal Palace neoclassical building, housing the Greek Parliament since 1934, is immediately across Amalias Avenue to the east, and surrounded by the extensive National Gardens, which are open to the public; the Parliament itself is not open to the public, even when not in session. Every hour, the changing of the guard ceremony, performed by the Presidential Guard, is conducted in front of the Tomb of the Unknown Soldier on the area between the Syntagma Square and Parliament building. On certain days, a ceremonial changing of the guard occurs with an army band and the majority of the 120 Evzones present at 11 am.

== History ==
The square was designed and constructed in the early 19th century, shortly after King Otto moved the capital of the newly born Greek Kingdom from Nafplio to Athens in 1834. It was designed as one of the two central squares of modern Athens, situated to what were then the eastern boundaries of the city. The second square was Omonoia Square, to the north of the city. Even though King Otto's Royal Palace was at first planned to be erected on Omonia Square, a location overlooking the eastern square was deemed a better option. Thus, the square's first name was "Palace Square". Work for the construction of the Old Palace to the north of the square, started in 1836 and lasted until 1843.

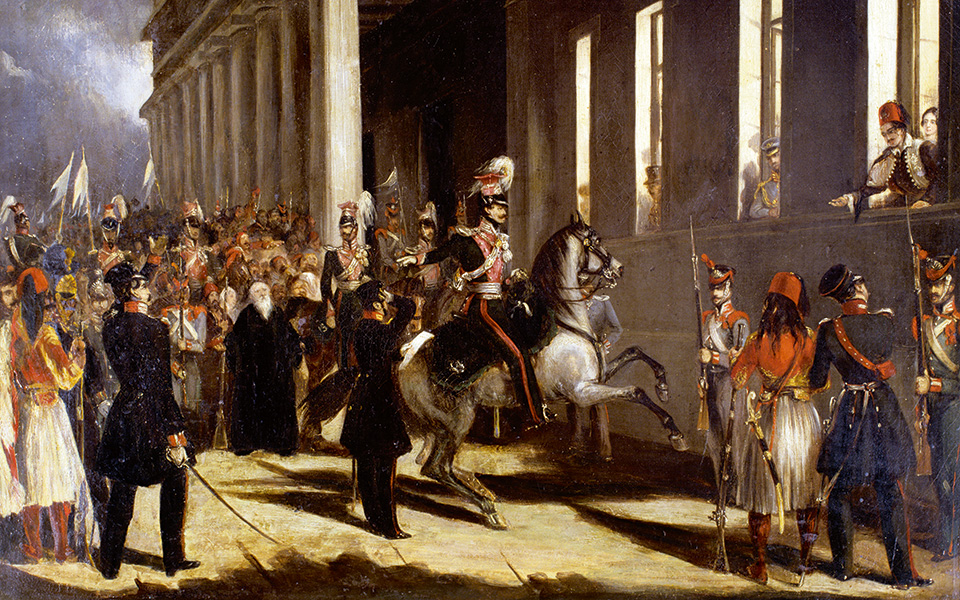
Dimitrios Kallergis on horseback demanding Constitution, Otto and Amalia at the windows of the Royal Palace.

In late July 1843, a popular and military uprising took place in the Greek Capital on September 3, 1843. Soldiers under Dimitrios Kallergis gathered in front of the palace and demanded the granting of constitution. King Otto was then obliged to grant the first Constitution of Greece. In memory of the event, the palace square was renamed to Constitution Square or Syntagma Square in Greek.

In the summer of 1900, in the Square, films were projected outdoors, in the cafés.

Between 2010 and 2012, the square was the site of mass protests by crowds of many thousands of people, due to the worsening economic situation during the Greek government debt crisis.

== Transport ==
Syntagma Square is a hub for many forms of public transportation in Athens and is one of the busiest transport hubs in Greece. Metro lines 2 and 3 of the Athens Metro have a stop at the Syntagma station, which is to be found under the square; the Athens Tram also has its northern terminal next to the square. Buses and trolleybuses start, terminate and connect the square to many places in the metropolitan area. Travel between Syntagma Square and the Eleftherios Venizelos Airport is available via the special airport bus line X95 and metro line 3. Free high-speed Wireless Internet access (4 Mbit/s) is offered by the Municipality of Athens at the square. The square is also a hub for buses to the northern suburbs and the Athens Olympic Complex in Maroussi.

== Attractions near the square ==
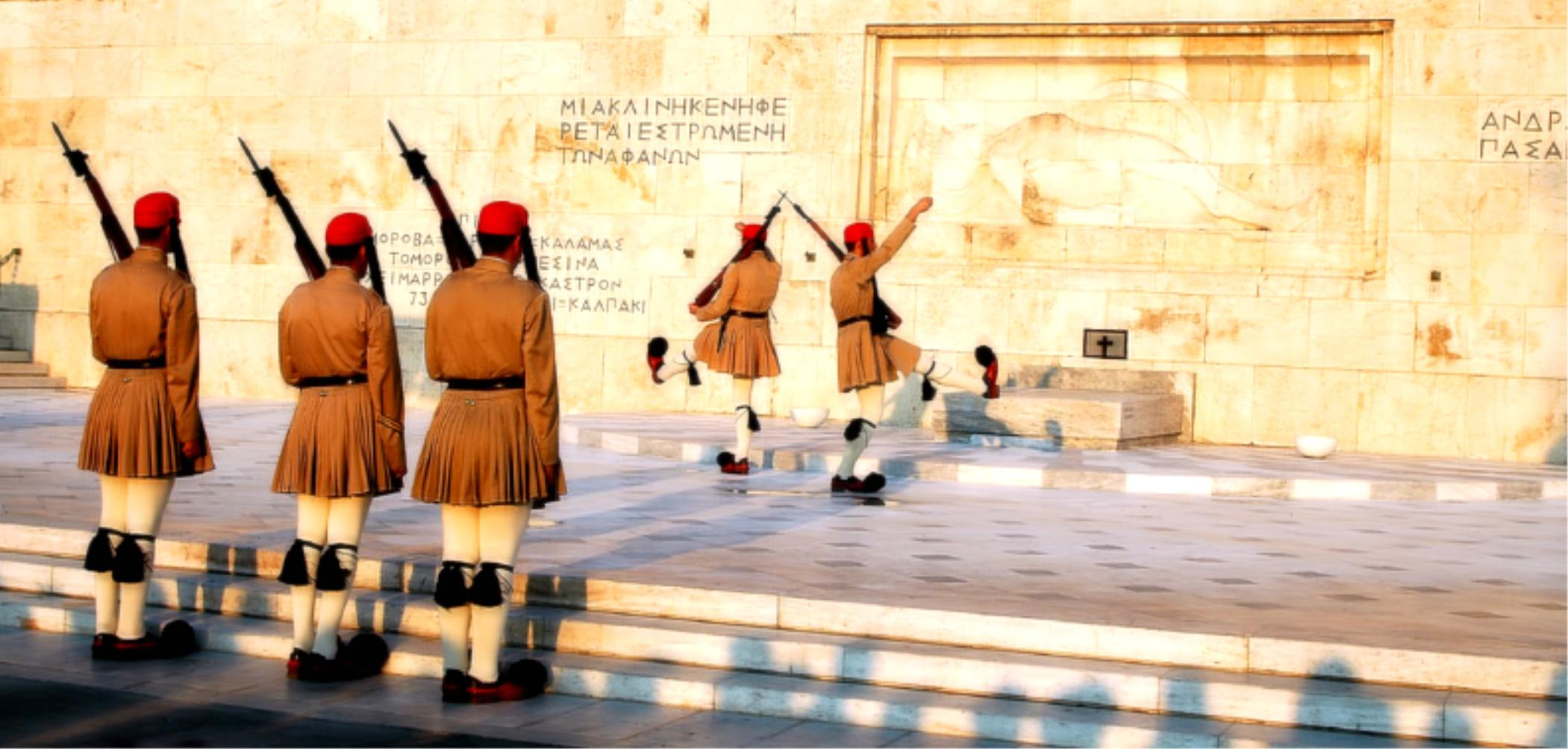
Changing of the Guard: Evzones in front of the Tomb of the Unknown Soldier.

The square is located near many of Athens' oldest and most famous neighbourhoods and tourist attractions, all within walking distance:

- Plaka (Πλάκα),
- Monastiraki (Μοναστηράκι),
- Psiri (Ψυρρή)
- Kolonaki (Κολωνάκι)
- Acropolis (Ακρόπολις),
- Theater of Dionysus,
- Areopagus, the Ancient Agora of Athens (Αρχαία Αγορά των Αθηνών)
- Hadrian's Library,
- Tower of the Winds in the Roman Agora,
- Choragic Monument of Lysicrates,
- Arch of Hadrian (Αψίς του Ανδριανού),
- Temple of Olympian Zeus (Ναός του Ολυμπίου Διός),
- Pnyx (Πνύκα),
- Philopappos Monument (Μνημείο του Φιλοπάππου) on the Hill of the Nymphs,
- Kerameikos Cemetery (Νεκροταφείο Κεραμικού),
- Tomb of the Unknown Soldier (Μνημείο του Αγνώστου Στρατιώτη)
- Syntagma Square
- Mount Lycabettus

Historic churches also dot the area, some dating from the Middle Ages.

== In popular culture ==
In the film Jason Bourne (2016), Syntagma Square is represented by the Plaza de España of Santa Cruz de Tenerife (Canary Islands, Spain).

== Gallery ==
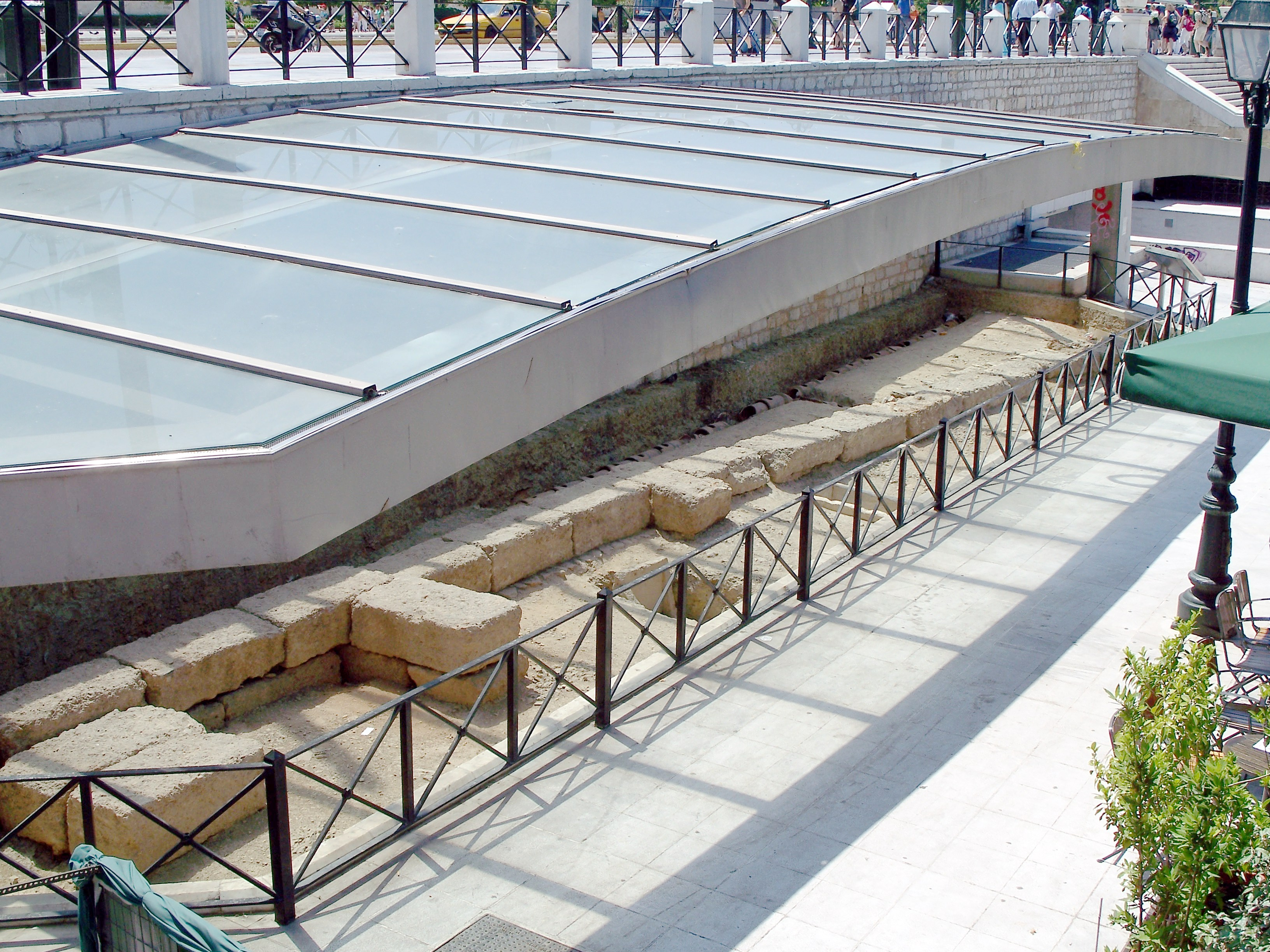
Portion of the Peisistratian aqueduct on display at Syntagma square

Syntagma Square and George I Street, circa 1900

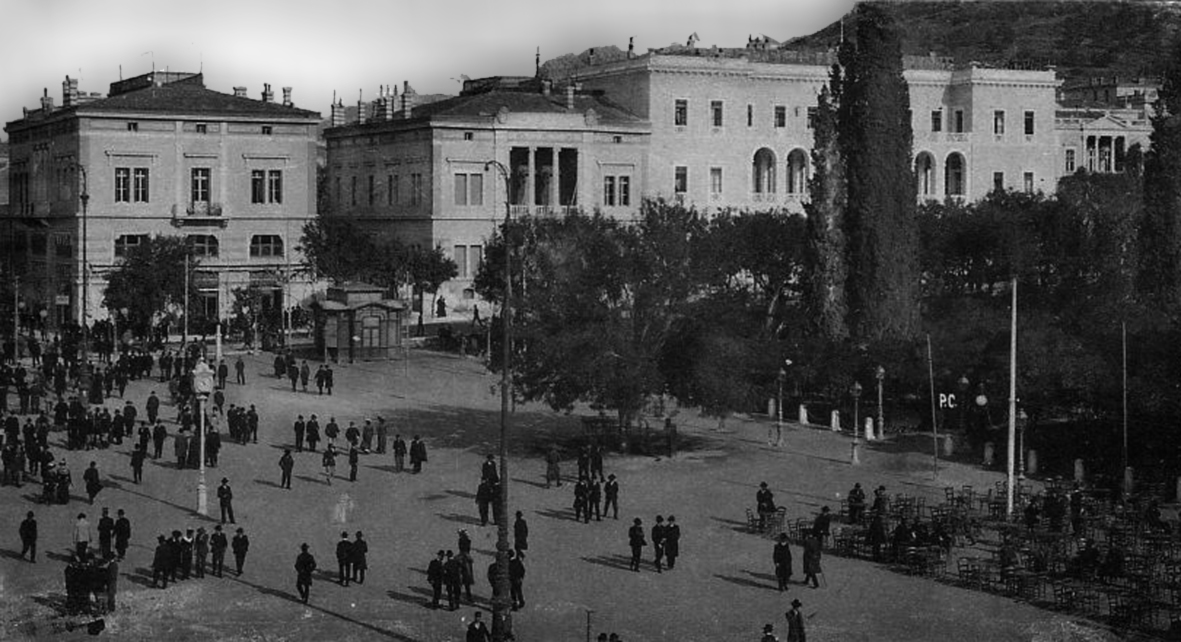
The square in 1910

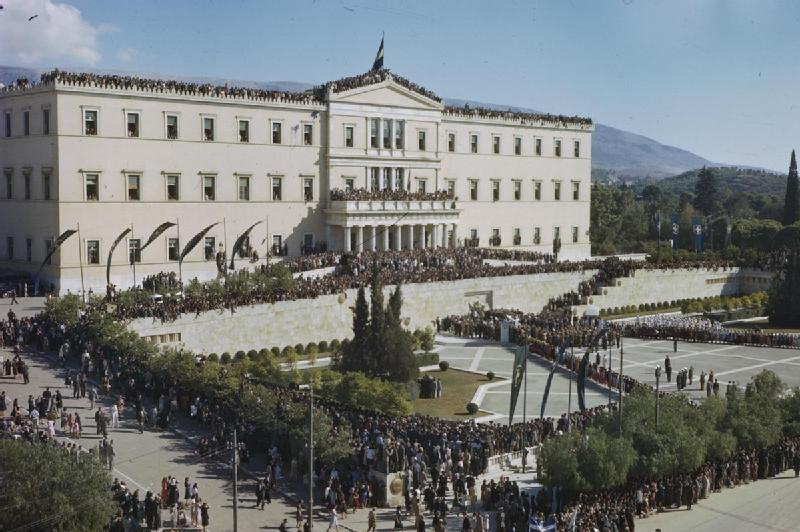
Crowd celebrates the liberation from the Axis Powers (October 1944)

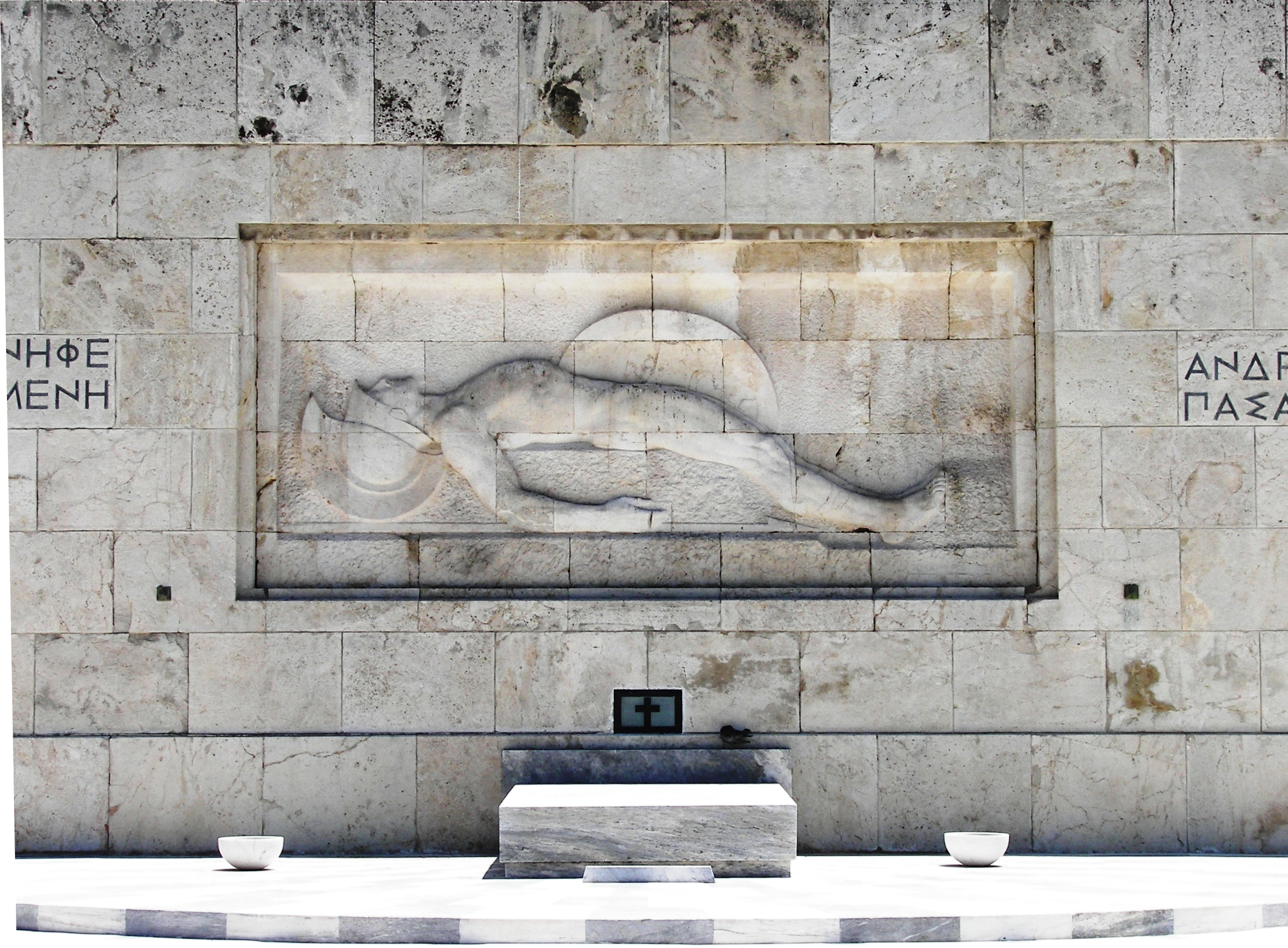
The Tomb of the Unknown Soldier

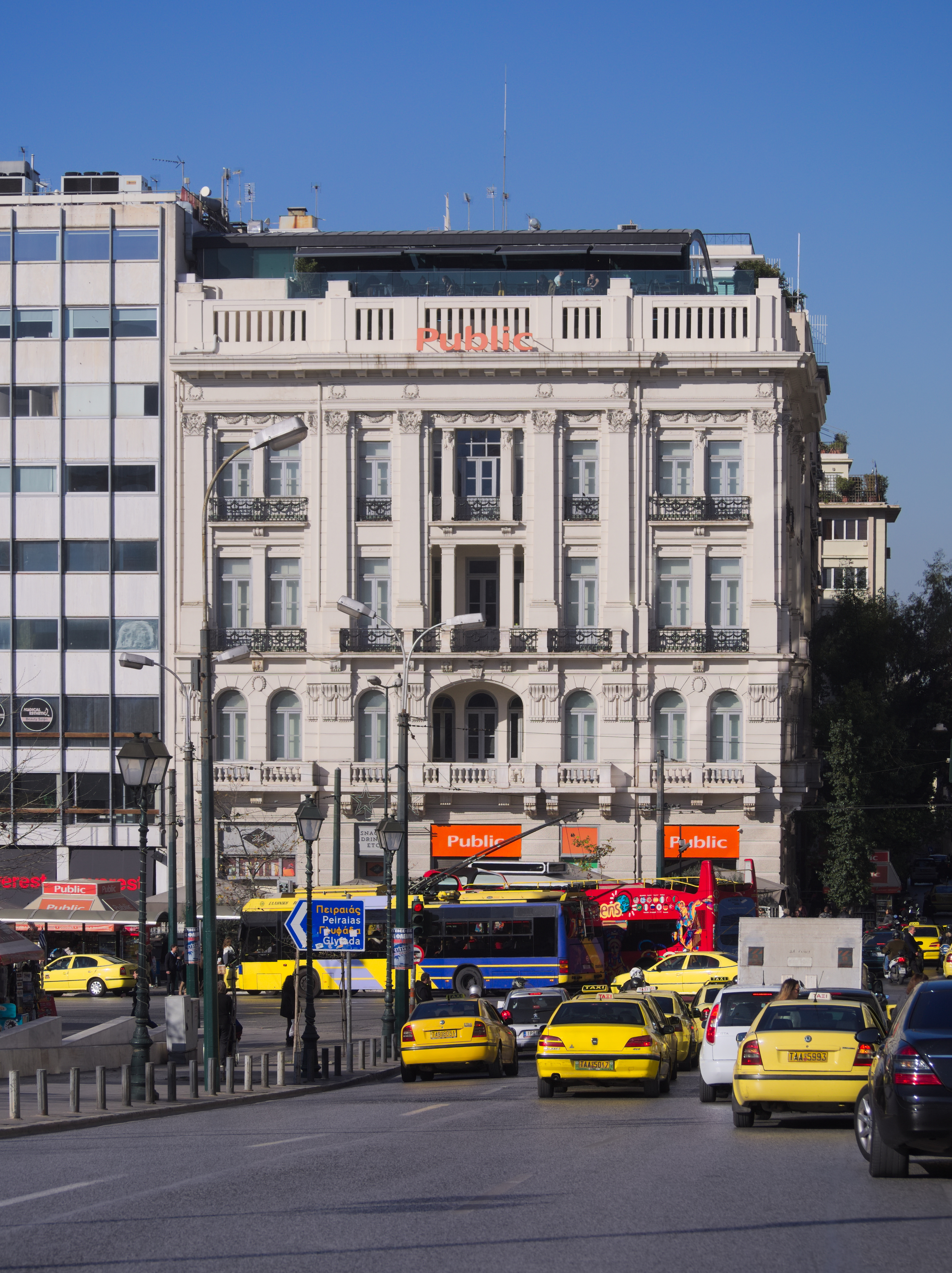
Pallis mansion (arch. Anastasios Metaxas)

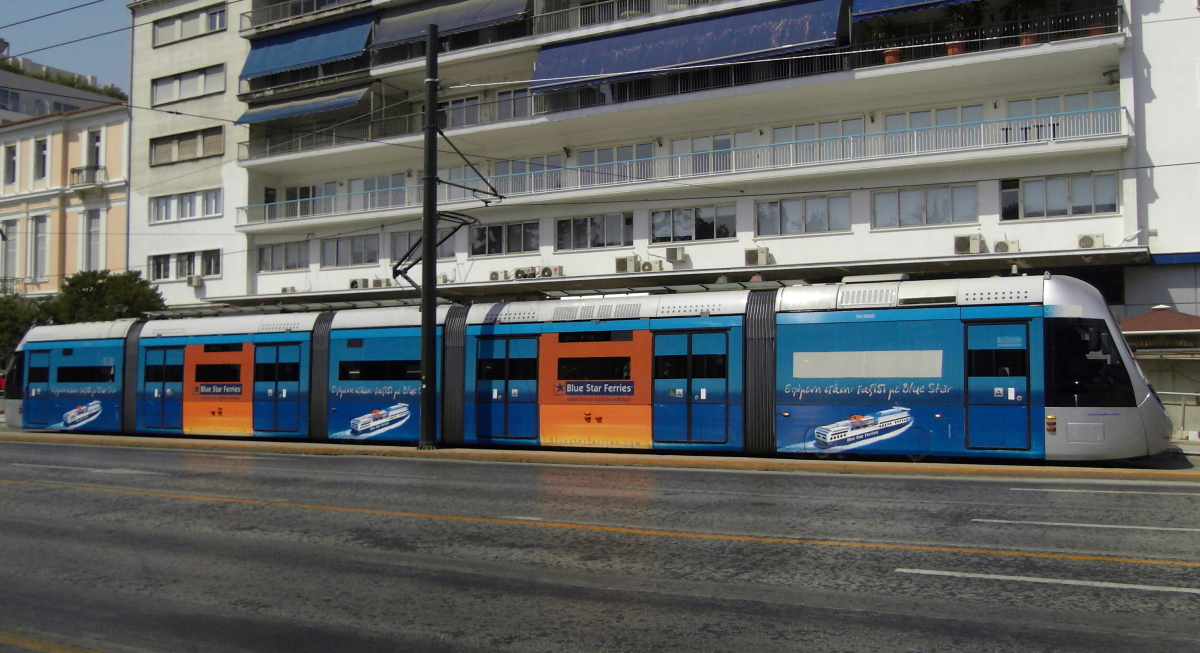
Athens Tram in Syntagma

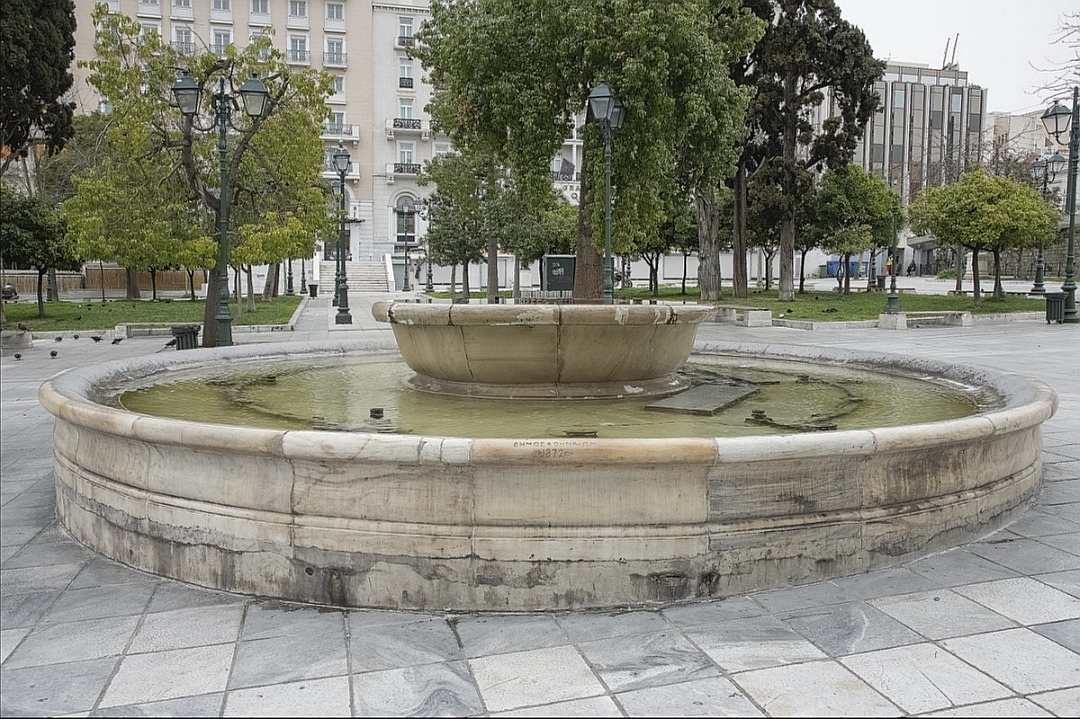
The fountain of Syntagma Square
