= Cairness House =

Country house in Aberdeenshire, Scotland

Coordinates: 57.6382°N 1.9375°W

Designations

Inventory of Gardens and Designed Landscapes in Scotland
- Official name: Cairness
- Designated: 29 June 2011
- Reference no.: GDL00396

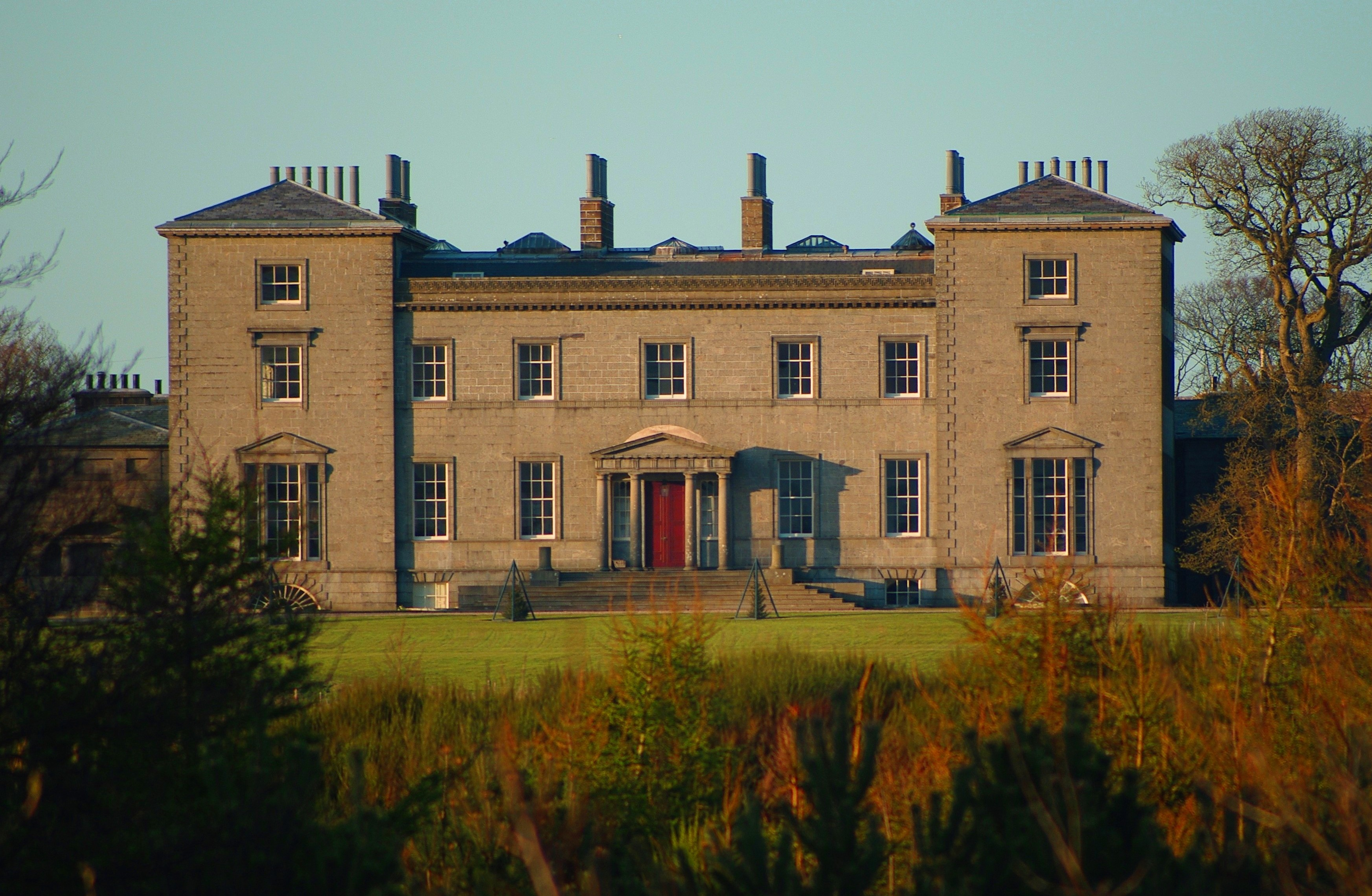
Cairness House viewed from the south

Cairness House, 4.5 miles (7 km) south-east of Fraserburgh in Buchan in the county of Aberdeenshire, is a country house built in the Neoclassical style between 1791 and 1797 to designs by architect James Playfair. It replaced an earlier house of 1781 by Robert Burn, which was in part incorporated into the Playfair scheme. Sir John Soane assisted in the final stages of the construction after Playfair's death in 1794. The park was laid out by Thomas White, a follower of Lancelot 'Capability' Brown.

The Pevsner Architectural Guide for Aberdeenshire North and Moray states that "Cairness House, by James Playfair 1791-97, is of international importance as the only house in Britain, the design and construction of which reflected and evolved with the rapid advances in French Neoclassicism towards the end of the C18" and that "its survival is the more precious as so many of Playfair's other designs were either not built or have been lost or altered".

== History ==
Cairness House was commissioned by Charles Gordon of Cairness and Buthlaw, a descendant of the Barclays of Cairness through his mother. The house was part of a 9,000-acre (3,600 ha) estate that included the village of St Comb's and the Loch of Strathbeg. The second laird, Major-General Thomas Gordon (1788–1841), a good friend of Lord Byron, was a hero of the Greek War of Independence and wrote a celebrated history of the conflict.

The Gordon family sold the estate in 1937 to the Countess of Southesk. During the Second World War, the house was rented to the Consolidated Pneumatic Tool Company of Fraserburgh as evacuation premises for their London head office. After the war, the house was used as a farmhouse and gradually fell into serious decline. The park was destroyed from the early 1950s onwards, with the mass clearance of trees, to reclaim land for agricultural use. In 1991, the house was listed as a Building at Risk by the Scottish Civic Trust. A major long-term restoration programme of the house and grounds was instigated by new owners in 2001.

In 2009, the project won the Georgian Group Architectural Awards prize for best restoration of a Georgian country house in Britain. The Georgian Group stated that "From being a moribund building at risk riddled with dry rot, Cairness is now a magnificent private home." The prize was given by the Duke of Gloucester at a ceremony at Christie's, London, in November 2009.

Cairness House is designated a category A listed building. and the grounds are included in the Inventory of Gardens and Designed Landscapes in Scotland.

== Architecture ==
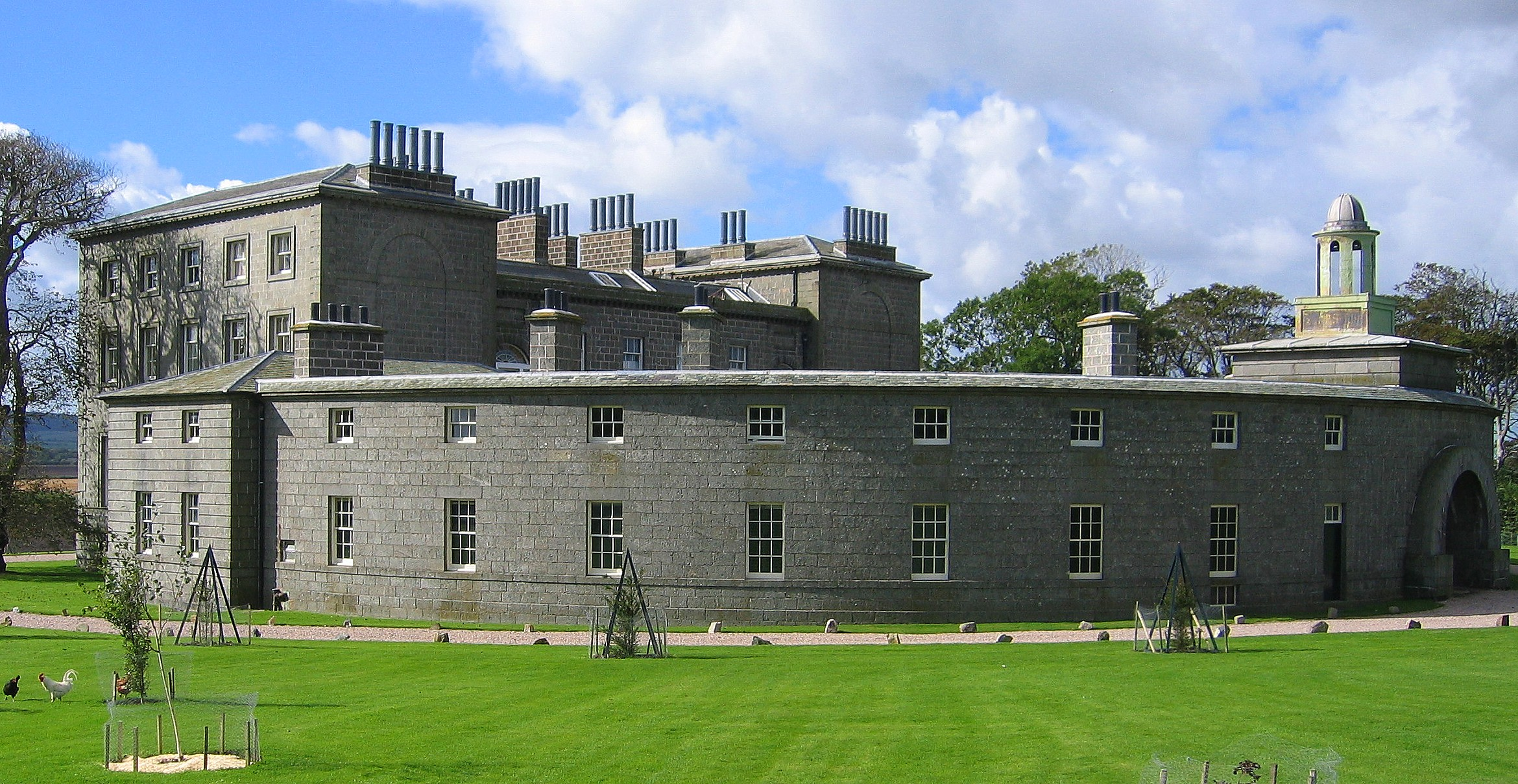
Cairness House: The Hemicycle from the east. The structure is 270 ft long (82 m) and encloses two pavilions and courtyards at the back

Considered one of the finest examples of Neoclassical architecture in Britain, Cairness House shows the influence of the French architects Étienne-Louis Boullée and Claude Nicholas Ledoux and has many parallels with the works of Sir John Soane.

The design incorporates a complex mixture of Masonic and pagan symbols as well as many numerological and architectural conceits. It is a calendar house, and its ground plan shows an adjoining "C" and "H", variously standing for Cairness House and Charles Gordon.

Constructed in finely detailed granite ashlar, Cairness House consists of a 110-foot (34 m) main block, flanked by two raised "bookend" wings. A tetrastyle pedimented Roman Doric porch sits at the centre, its unjointed columns hewn from menhirs taken from a nearby druids' stone circle. A pair of lower pavilions with representations of the Masonic Altar and Royal Arch adjoin at the back. From these pavilions extends a huge semicircular service wing, with a central bell tower above a lunette arch, enclosing a courtyard at the rear of the house. The centre of the courtyard is dominated by a round ice house modelled on the Temple of Vesta in Rome. The main roof is surmounted by 51 cast-iron chimney pots in the shape of fluted Doric columns.

The interiors are boldly neoclassical with fine examples of simulated marble walls, pendentive or coffered ceilings and Greek key friezes. The Egyptian Room was the first of its kind in Britain and contains elaborate hieroglyph plasterwork; it is the earliest surviving Egyptian Revival room in the world and may have been used as a meeting room for the Rite of High Egyptian Masonry founded by Count Cagliostro. The Entrance Hall features a columbarium fireplace with anthemion antefixes.

James Playfair also drew plans for gates and a pair of small lodges for the entrance to the driveway which however were not built until the house's centenary in 1891. The gates, railings and lodges come under a separate Category A listing by Historic Environment Scotland. The pillars on either side of the gates feature a pair of Greek sphinxes.
