= James Playfair (architect) =

British architect (1755–1794)

- Born: 5 August 1755; Benvie, Forfarshire, Scotland
- Died: 23 February 1794 (aged 38); Edinburgh, Scotland
- Occupation: Architect
- Spouse: Jessie Graham
- Children: William Henry Playfair
- Relatives: John Playfair (brother); William Playfair (brother)
- Buildings: Cairness House; Glens Old Parish Church, Kirriemuir

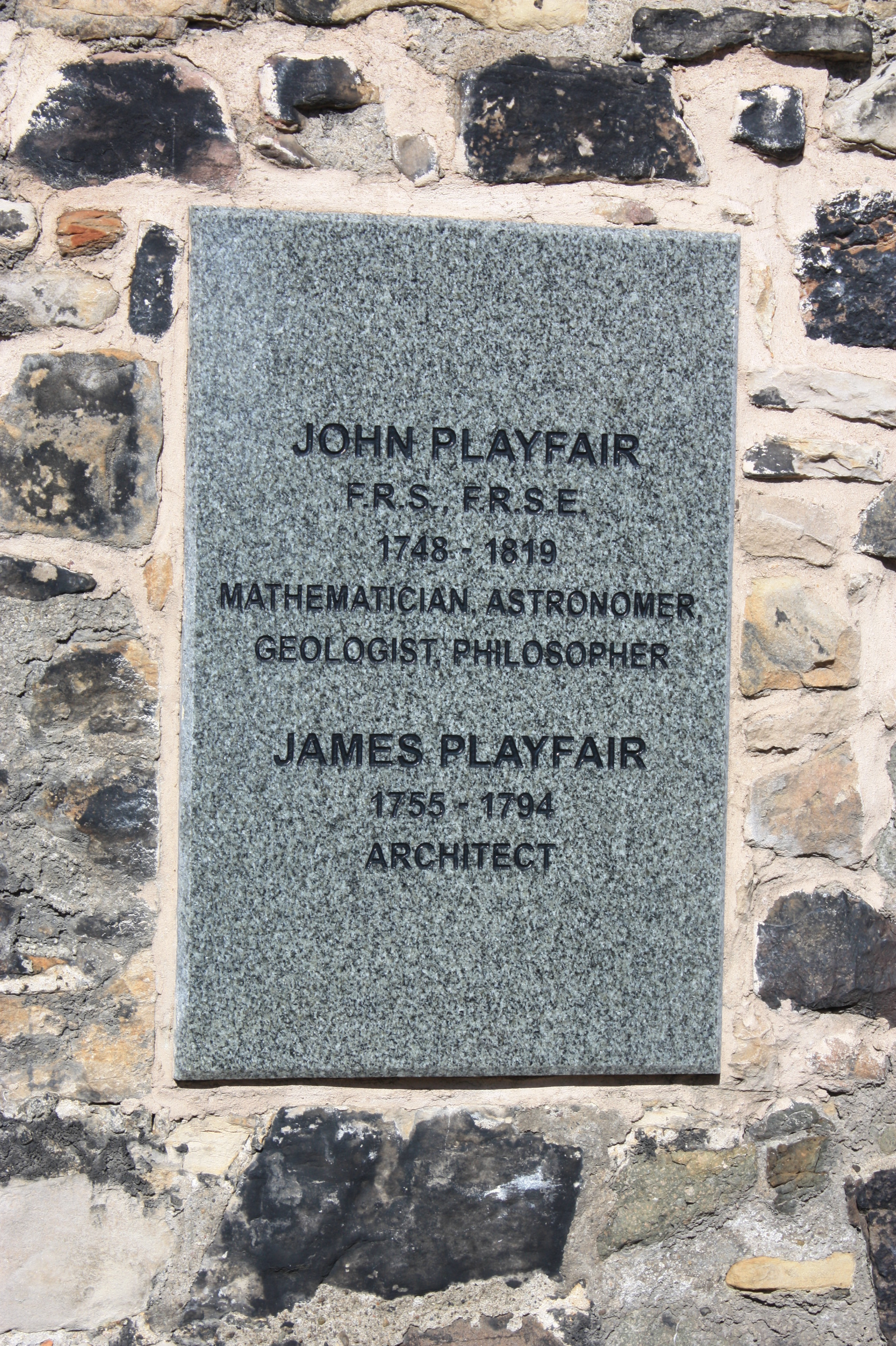
Memorial to James and John Playfair, Old Calton Burial Ground

James Playfair (5 August 1755 – 23 February 1794) was a Scottish architect who worked largely in the neoclassical tradition.

== Biography ==
Playfair was born in 1755 in Benvie near Dundee, where his father James Playfair was the parish minister. He was the brother of William Playfair the engineer, with whom he shared business and living quarters in London; and the mathematician John Playfair, of the University of Edinburgh. He established himself in London in the mid 1780s with the support of politician Henry Dundas, who assisted him in developing a client base largely made up of other Scots. His son, William Henry Playfair (1790–1857), was also a celebrated architect, responsible for many of the buildings in Edinburgh’s New Town.

James Playfair's works include Melville Castle, which he designed for Dundas in Midlothian and the Glens Old Parish Church, Kirriemuir (1786–1788). His most famous building is Cairness House (1791–1797), in Aberdeenshire, which used revolutionary forms of neoclassicism, and is unique in British architecture of the period. Cairness House shows the influence of the French architects Étienne-Louis Boullée and Claude Nicholas Ledoux, and is also notable for having the earliest complete Egyptian room in Britain. Playfair was notable for applying techniques derived from classical architects, such as baths and heating, to current-age structures. He also designed Kirriemuir and the Glens Parish Church, as well as the Lynedoch mausoleum at Methven parish church.

On his death in 1794, most of Playfair's papers were bought by his close friend Sir John Soane and are now housed at Sir John Soane's Museum in London.
