= Battle of Phaleron =

1827 battle during the Greek War of Independence

- Part of the Greek War of Independence
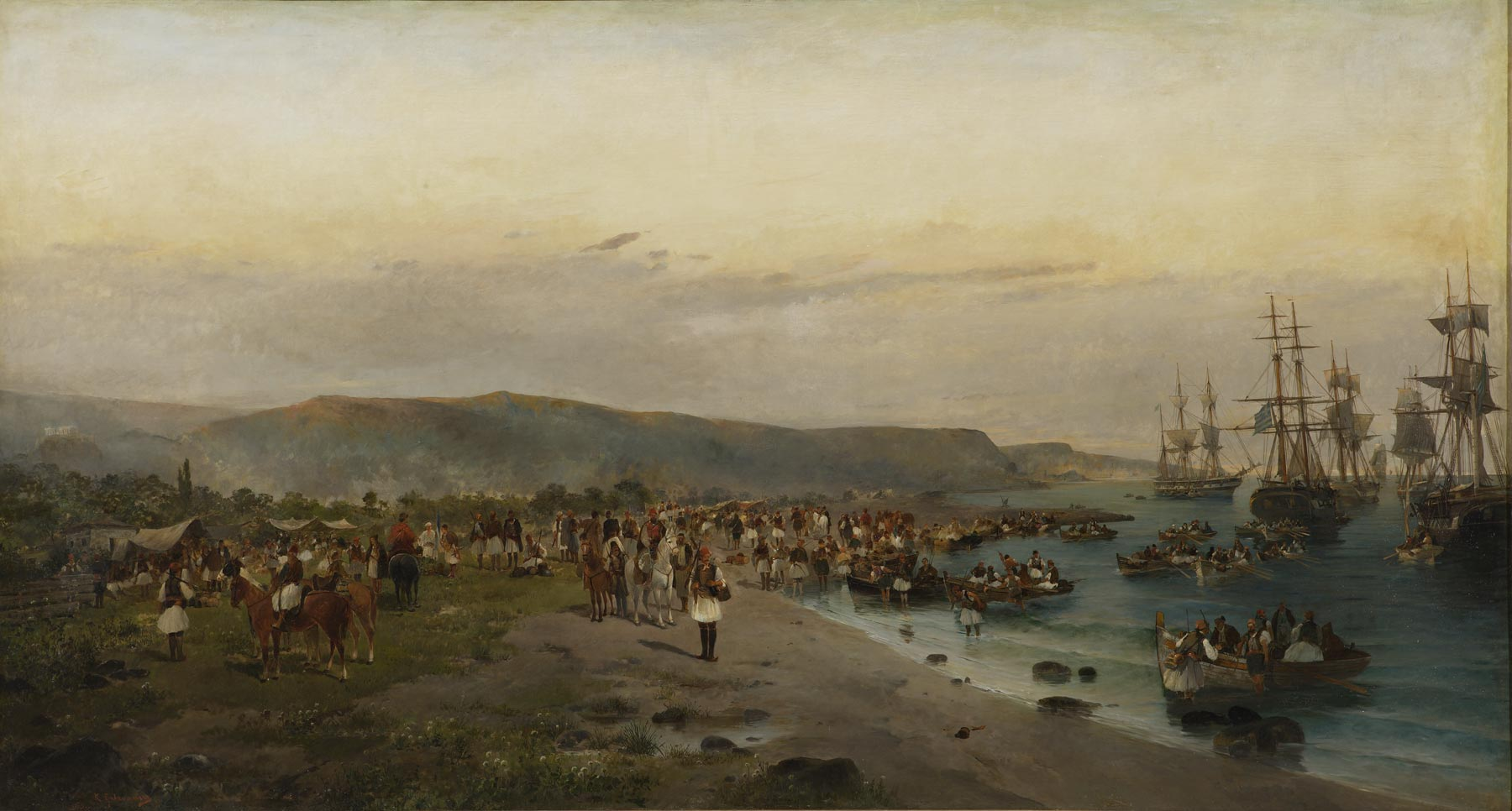
- Karaiskakis landing at Faliron by Konstantinos Volanakis
Date	24 April (6 May) 1827
Location	Phaleron, Sanjak of Eğriboz, Ottoman Empire (now Attica, Greece) 37.9333°N 23.7000°E
Result	Ottoman victory

Belligerents
(Greece) First Hellenic Republic: Souliot Forces; Philhellenes	Ottoman Empire

Commanders and leaders
Lord Cochrane; Sir Richard Church; Georgios Karaiskakis †; Yannis Makriyannis; Ioannis Notaras †; Tousias Botsaris †	Reşid Mehmed Pasha

Strength
3,000	Unknown (some cavalry)

Casualties and losses
1,500 dead	Unknown

The Battle of Phaleron or Battle of Analatos took place on 6 May (O.S.: 24 April) 1827, during the Greek War of Independence. The Greek rebel forces were being besieged inside the Acropolis of Athens by Ottoman forces under the command of Mehmed Reshid Pasha. Greek forces outside the city were desperately trying to break the siege.

== Battle ==
In order to break the siege of Acropolis, the British officers Admiral Lord Cochrane and General Richard Church, who were nominally commanding the Greeks, decided to make an assault against the Turkish camp under the command of Mehmed Reshid Pasha.

Two days before the battle, on 22 April 1827, Georgios Karaiskakis, the general of Central Greece, was fatally wounded in a minor clash with the Ottomans. He perished one day later, and his sudden death seriously damaged Greek morale and emboldened the Turks.

The battle began on 24 April, 3,000 men were ordered to advance across the plain. Their plan was to send 7,000 more men who were at Piraeus to attack the Ottomans from the flanks. Karaiskakis had proposed the day before instead of a direct attack, to cut the supply lines of the Ottomans in eastern Greece, but his proposal was not accepted.

As the Greeks advanced from Phaleron, Reshid sent some cavalry to attack the Greeks. He expected the main assault to come from Piraeus. The troops from Piraeus did not arrive and the rest of the Greeks were attacked by the Ottoman cavalry. The Greek army was totally destroyed and its troops scattered. All Souliotes and Cretans fell, 22 Philhellenes, 270 regular soldiers, hundreds of irregulars and the Greek chieftains Ioannis Notaras, Lampros Veikos, Georgios Drakos, Georgios Tzavelas and Tousias Botsaris were killed by the cavalry attack.

In total, the Greeks lost either 1,500 or 2,000 men, which was a devastating setback. The Battle of Phaleron was seen as the greatest Greek defeat in the Greek War of Independence. The men in the Acropolis surrendered on 5 June and were escorted by the French army to the coast. This defeat destroyed Greek morale and the only places on mainland Greece that persevered after the battle were Mani and Nafplio, seat of the government.

== Aftermath ==
Later that year, the Great Powers (Imperial Russia, France, and Great Britain) destroyed the Egyptian and Ottoman fleets in the Battle of Navarino.
