= 3 September 1843 Revolution =

Military uprising in Greece which established a constitutional monarchy

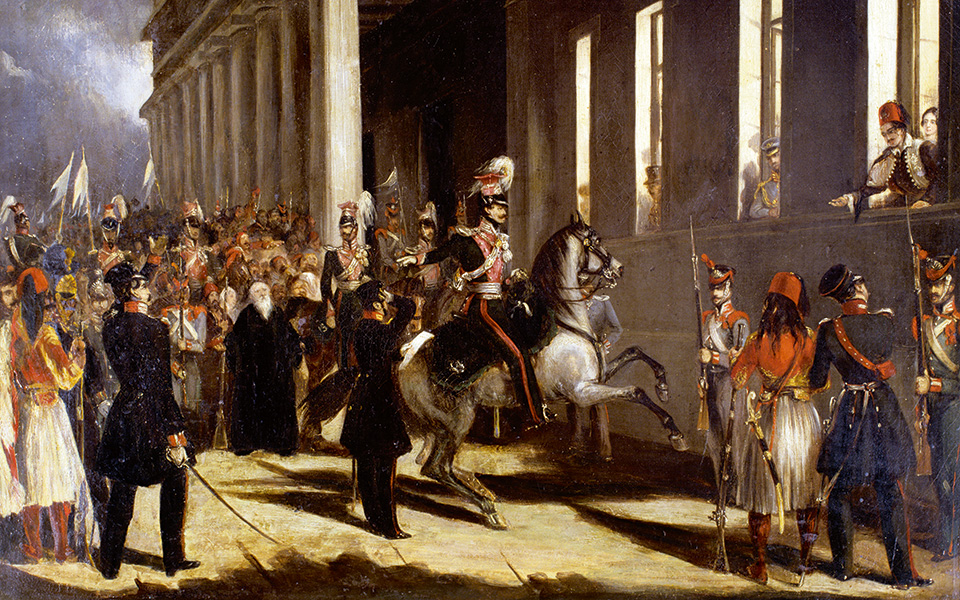
- Dimitrios Kallergis on horseback approaching Otto and Amalia at the windows of the Old Royal Palace.
| Date | 15 September 1843 |
| Location | Syntagma Square and the Old Royal Palace, Athens, Kingdom of Greece |
| Result | Revolutionary victory: Greece becomes a Constitutional Monarchy; Greek Constitution of 1844 is introduced; Universal suffrage is granted |

Belligerents
| Hellenic Army; Political support: French Party; Russian Party; English Party; Supported by: France; United Kingdom of Great Britain and Ireland | Greek Monarchy; Bavarian Officials; Supported by: Bavaria; Russia |

Commanders and leaders
| (Greece) Yannis Makriyannis (Greece) Andreas Metaxas (Greece) Andreas Londos (Greece) Konstantinos Zografos (Greece) Michael Soutzos (Greece) Rigas Palamidis (Greece) Dimitrios Kallergis (Greece) Nikolaos Skarvelis (Greece) Spyros Milios | King Otto |

The 3 September 1843 Revolution (Greek: Επανάσταση της 3ης Σεπτεμβρίου 1843; N.S. 15 September) was an uprising by the Hellenic Army in Athens, supported by large sections of the people, against the autocratic rule of King Otto. The rebels, led by veterans of the Greek War of Independence, demanded the granting of a constitution and the departure of the Bavarian officials that dominated the government. The revolution succeeded, ushering in the period of constitutional monarchy (under the 1844 constitution) and universal manhood suffrage in Greece.

== Background ==
During the War of Independence, the Greek rebels had passed a series of liberal and progressive constitutions on which the war's provisional governments were based. With the establishment of the monarchy in 1832 and the arrival of the Bavarian prince Otto as king, however, these liberal institutions were discarded. For the next 10 years, Otto and his mainly Bavarian officials would rule in an autocratic manner, causing large-scale resentment amongst a people that had just been liberated from foreign rule. The "Bavarocracy" (Βαυαροκρατία), as it was called, intentionally recalling the periods of "Francocracy" and "Turkocracy", even extended to the use of German alongside Greek in the state administration.

Greek politicians constantly demanded an end to this state of affairs. They wished for the Bavarians, above all the much-despised Major Hess, to be sent back to their country and for a constitution to be granted. However, they did not question the monarchy itself or the power of the king. Indeed, they did not wish to impose a constitution, but demanded that the king grant them one. These demands grew ever stronger as time passed, and cut across the political spectrum: all political parties, the French, the English, and the Russian, expressed them.

== The conspiracy ==
The king's repeated refusals to yield to these demands led to a radicalisation. Therefore, the politicians resorted to conspiracy, which was not a new form of political action in Greece – indeed it had preceded and occurred during the War of Independence. The first Greek governments, such as that of John Capodistria, had to confront it, and conspiracies had never really disappeared. However, this movement was much more important and came out into the open on 3 September 1843.

The principal conspirators were Yannis Makriyannis, Andreas Metaxas, Andreas Londos, Constantine Zografos, Michael Soutzos and Rigas Palamidis. They had managed to convince certain officers to join their side, chief among these being Colonel Dimitrios Kallergis (Commander of the Athens cavalry), Colonel Nikolaos Skarvelis (Commander of the Athens infantry) and Colonel Spyromilios (Commander of the Military Academy). Thus, the conspirators were certain to have army support.

Their idea was to act quickly so as to present the Palace with a fait accompli. A first date was chosen: 25 March 1844, anniversary of the uprising against the Ottomans. The constitution would then appear as the logical and necessary consequence of independence. However, the secret was not well kept. Yannis Makriyannis, for example, spent his time trying to recruit new conspirators and in the process exposed the conspiracy. It was decided to pass more quickly to action, at the beginning of September 1843.

== The revolution ==
On the night of 2 September 1843, it was learned that the names of the conspirators were known to the police. Moreover, incidents took place around Makriyannis' home. Therefore, Kallergis acted on his own initiative. He went looking for his men in their barracks and headed toward the Old Royal Palace. At the same time, he ordered that the gates of Medrese Prison be opened.

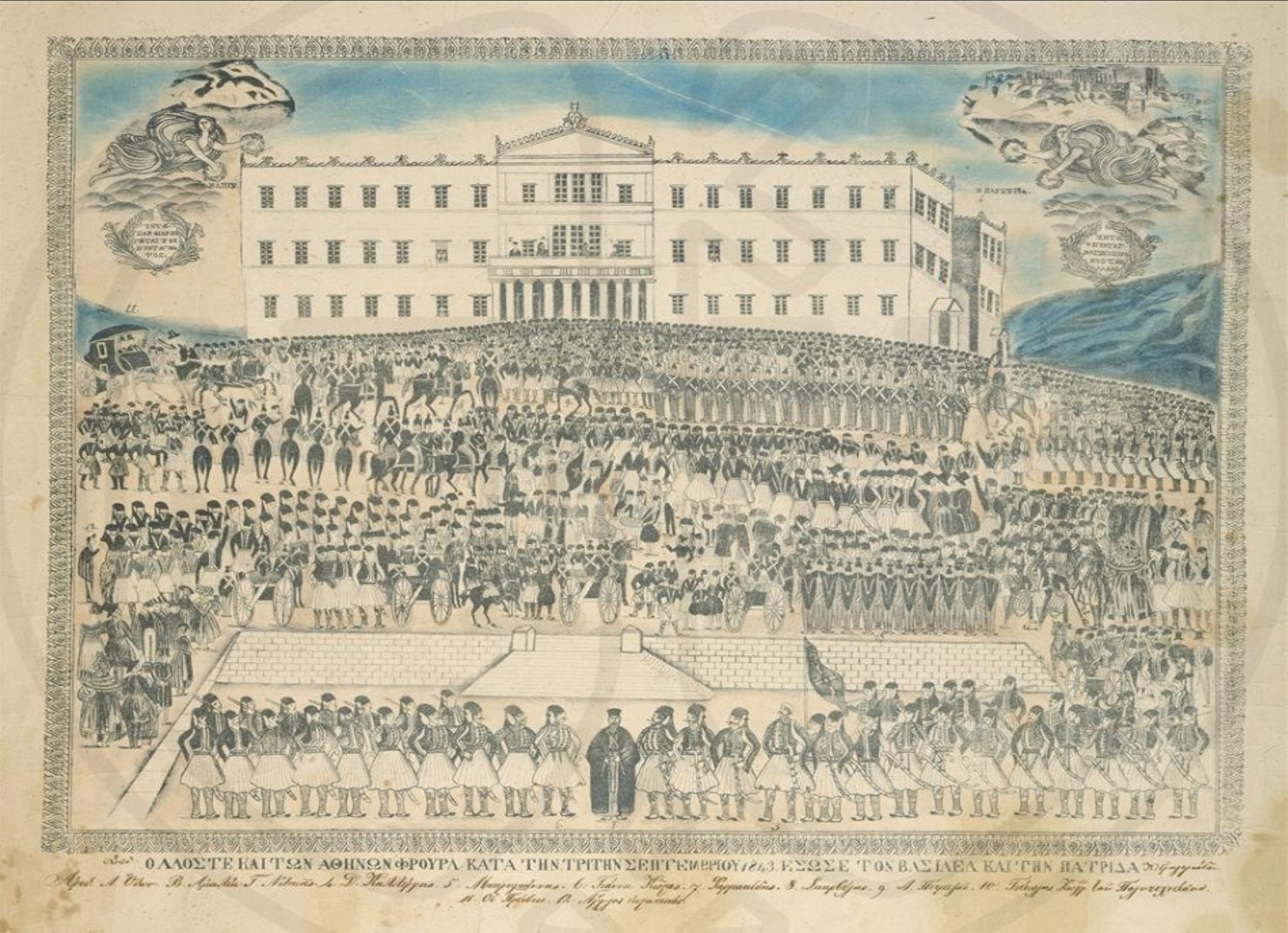
The Revolution of 1843

Captain Schinas, who commanded the Athens artillery, received an order to suppress the nascent insurrection, but preferred to join the movement. The soldiers arrived at the Old Royal Palace and shouted "Long live the Constitution!" beneath the king's windows.

Otto could not but yield to the demands and granted the 1844 Constitution. In fact, the Council of State had already drawn up the constitution in anticipation of the coup. The king then asked Metaxas to form a new government and to summon a new national assembly, which met on 10 November (OS)/20 November (NS). The troops returned to their barracks, acclaiming the king as a "constitutional" one.

The coup was bloodless. France and the United Kingdom accepted these changes without difficulty. For the French of the July Monarchy era, 3 September 1843 could only bring to mind their own Revolution of 1830. As for the British, their Glorious Revolution of 1688 was a liberal model par excellence in the 19th century. Only Russia condemned the movement, due to its autocratic, authoritarian, and consequently anti-liberal nature. The assembly designated a constitutional commission and a constitution was proclaimed in March 1844.

Since then, the square in front of the Old Royal Palace has been renamed Constitution Square, or Syntagma Square in Greek.

== See also ==
- 23 October 1862 Revolution

== Bibliography ==
- Brunet de Presle and A. Blanchet, La Grèce depuis la conquête romaine jusqu'à nos jours., Firmin Didot, Paris, 1860.
