= Yannis Makriyannis =

Greek independence leader and author (1797–1864)

General Yiannis Makriyiannis
- Γιάννης Μακρυγιάννης
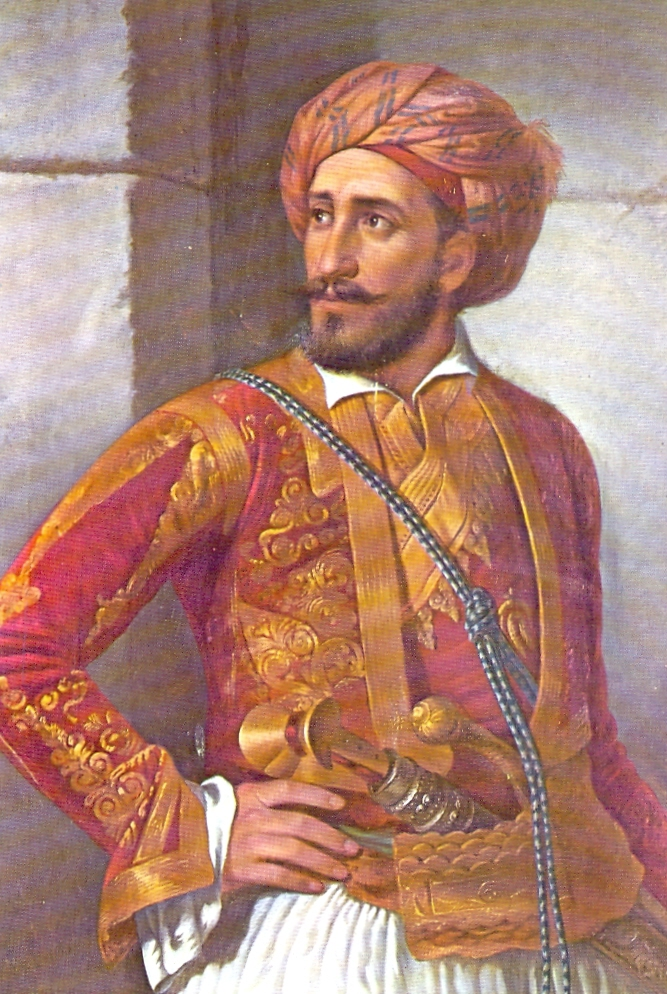
- A portrait of Yiannis Makriyiannis

General Leader of the Executive Authority of the Peloponnese
- Governor: Ioannis Kapodistrias
- In office 1828 – August 1831

Representative of Athens
- In office 1843-?
- In office 1862–1864
- Monarchs: Otto; George I
- Prime Minister: Andreas Metaxas; Dimitrios Voulgaris; Aristeidis Moraitinis; Zinovios Valvis; Diomidis Kyriakos; Benizelos Roufos; Konstantinos Kanaris

Personal details
- Born: Ioannis Triantaphyllou; Ιωάννης Τριανταφύλλου; 1797 Avoriti, Sanjak of Eğriboz, Ottoman Empire (now Greece)
- Died: 1864 (aged 66-67) Athens, Kingdom of Greece
- Resting place: First Cemetery of Athens
- Spouse: Katigo Skouze
- Children: Leonidas; Dimitrios; Georgios; Katigo; Othonas; Nikolaos; Vasiliki; Thrasyvoulos; Kitsos; Eleni
- Nickname(s): Makriyiannis; Μακρυγιάννης

Military service
- Allegiance: First Hellenic Republic; Kingdom of Greece
- Branch/service: Hellenic Army
- Years of service: 1821–1864
- Rank: General
- Battles/wars: Greek War of Independence; Siege of Arta; Battle of Peta; Greek Civil Wars; Battle of the Lerna Mills; Second Siege of the Acropolis; Battle of Kastella; Battle of Phaleron; 3 September 1843 Revolution

Yiannis Makriyiannis (Greek: Γιάννης Μακρυγιάννης, Giánnēs Makrygiánnīs; (Note: Per the ISO system for Greek transliteration used by Wikipedia. Makriyannis's name has been variously transcribed over the years. It simply means "Big John", and in the 19th century it was variously written as Makry-Yannis, Makrygiannis, Makriyannis, Macriyanni, Makriyanni, Macroyannis, &c. The former US BGN & UK PCGN romanization was Yiánnis or Ioánnis Makriyiánnis.) 1797–1864), born Ioannis Triantaphyllou (Ιωάννης Τριανταφύλλου, Iōánnēs Triantafýllou), was a Greek merchant, military officer, politician and author, best known today for his Memoirs. Starting from humble origins, he joined the Greek struggle for independence, achieving the rank of general and leading his men to notable victories, most notably the successful defense of Nafplio in the Battle of the Lerna Mills. Following Greek independence, he had a tumultuous public career, playing a prominent part in the granting of the first Constitution of the Kingdom of Greece and later being sentenced to death and pardoned.

Despite his important contributions to the political life of the early Greek state, general Makriyiannis is mostly remembered for his Memoirs. Aside from being a source of historical and cultural information about the period, this work has also been called a "monument of Modern Greek literature", as it is written in pure Demotic Greek. Indeed, its literary quality led Nobel laureate Giorgos Seferis to call Makriyiannis one of the greatest masters of Modern Greek prose.

== Biography ==
=== Early life ===
Yiannis Makriyiannis was born to a poor family at the village of Avoriti, in Phocis. "Makriyiannis" (Long Yiannis) was a nickname he acquired because of his height. His father, Dimitris Triantaphyllou, was killed in a clash with the forces of Ali Pasha. His family was forced to flee to Levadeia, where Makriyiannis spent his childhood up to 1811. At age seven, he was given as a foster son to a wealthy man from Levadeia, but the menial labour and beatings he endured were, in his own words, "his death". Thus, in 1811 he left for Arta to stay with an acquaintance who maintained close relations with Ali Pasha. There, still a teenager, he was involved in trade and, according to his memoirs, became a wealthy man. His property amounted to 40,000 piastres. According to Sphyroeras, he probably joined the Filiki Etaireia, a secret anti-Ottoman society, in 1820. In March 1821 he left for Patras, in the Peloponnese, supposedly on business. His actual assignment, however, was to inform local members of the Filiki Etaireia of the state of affairs in his native Roumeli. Having met with Odysseas Androutsos, he returned to Arta two days before the revolution broke out in Patras and was promptly arrested by the Ottoman authorities and placed under arrest in the local fortress. He was held captive for 90 days but managed to escape and, in August 1821, first took up arms against the Ottomans under chieftain Gogos Bakolas.

=== Activity during the War of Independence ===
Karaiskakis' camp in Kastella, Phaleron. Makriyiannis is depicted near the cannon.

Under the command of Gogos Bakolas, in September 1821 he took part in the battle of Stavros, near Tzoumerka, and in the battle of Peta, where he sustained a light leg injury. A few days later he took part in the siege of Arta that temporarily brought the city under Greek control. In late 1821, he left for Mesolonghi, but there, according to his memoirs, he fell seriously ill, only recovering in March 1822. Having spent his recovery in the village of Sernikaki, near Salona, he resumed military action, assuming the leadership of a band of warriors from four villages in the vicinity. He fought alongside several other chieftains during the successful siege of Patratziki, which had been fortified with considerable Ottoman forces.

After the Acropolis of Athens was surrendered by the Ottomans in June 1822, Makriyiannis was appointed Supervisor of Public Order in the city by the executive authority of Roumeli on 1 January 1823. In that office, he took severe measures aimed at stopping arbitrary oppression of the populace and thievery. In the summer of 1823, he fought alongside Nikitaras in the eastern part of Central Greece. In October 1823, he led a force of Roumeliots in the Peloponnese, and fought alongside the government of Georgios Kountouriotis against the rebels in the civil war. For his actions during that conflict, he was rewarded with the rank of brigadier, promoted to lieutenant general in August 1824 and full general in late 1824.

In March 1825, after the Peloponnese had been invaded by Egyptian forces, he was appointed politarch (head of public order) of Kyparissia and took part in the defence of Neokastro. After the fortress fell on 11 May 1825, he hurried to Myloi, near Nafplio, arriving with one hundred men on 10 June. He ordered the construction of makeshift fortifications, as well as the gathering of provisions. More chieftains soon arrived in Myloi and Ibrahim Pasha, the commander of the Egyptian forces, was unable to take the position, despite numerical superiority and the launching of fierce attacks on 12 and 14 June. Makriyiannis was injured during the battle and was carried to Nafplio.

Soon after the battle, he married the daughter of a prominent Athenian, and his activities were thereafter inextricably linked with that city until his death. After Athens was captured by Ibrahim Pasha in June 1826, Makriyiannis helped organise the defence of the Acropolis, and became the provisional commander of the garrison after the death of the commander, Yiannis Gouras. He managed to repel a fierce assault against the Odeon of Herodes Atticus on 7 October, and during the defence of the Acropolis, he sustained heavy injures three times, to the head and to the neck. These wounds troubled him for the remainder of his life, but they did not dissuade him from taking part in the last phase of the war: in the spring of 1827 he took part in the battles of Piraeus and the battle of Phaleron.

=== Activity after Greek Independence ===
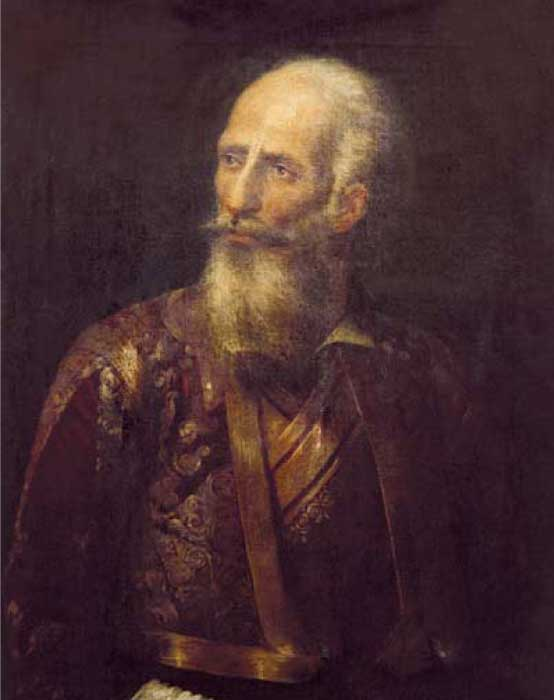
Portrait by Spyridon Prosalentis.

==== Governorship of Kapodistrias ====
Makriyiannis's activity did not cease with the achievement of Greek independence. After Governor Ioannis Kapodistrias arrived in Greece, he appointed Makriyiannis "General Leader of the Executive Authority of the Peloponnese", based in Argos, in 1828. It was during this period, and more specifically on 26 February 1829, that he started writing his Memoirs. After Kapodistrias restructured the military in 1830, Makriyiannis was given the rank of brigadier. However, he slowly came to oppose the Governor's policies and eventually broke with him. He opposed what he considered Kapodistrias's personal authoritarianism and, on a more personal level, was concerned about whether his home region would be included or not in the liberated Greek state. Influenced by Ioannis Kolettis, he even tried to force the Governor into accepting a constitutional form of government, using the troops under his command, but had no success. Finally, in August 1831, the government forced all civil servants and military personnel to sign an oath stating they were not part of secret organizations and that they were loyal servants of the government's commands. Makriyiannis considered this to be degrading, and tried to author his own version of an oath instead. This, however, was not accepted by the government, and he was consequently stripped of his positions. His opposition to the existing regime did not cease with the Governor's assassination on 9 October 1831. He took the side of the "Constitutionalists" and fought against the governor's brother and successor Augustinos Kapodistrias. He did, however, condemn the assassination itself in the strongest terms.

==== Reign of King Otto ====
Otto, Prince of Bavaria, was chosen as the first King of Greece in 1832, under the name Othon. His arrival in Nafplio, then the Greek capital, was hailed enthusiastically by Makriyiannis. This attitude is exemplified in his Memoirs:

Today the fatherland is reborn, that for so long was lost and extinguished. Today are raised from the dead the fighters, political, religious, as well as military, for our King has come, that we begot with the power of God. Praised be your most virtuous name, omnipotent and most merciful Lord.

— General Makriyannis, Memoirs.

The hopes he had for the new regime, however, were soon to be dispelled. King Otto was underage and Bavarian regents were named to rule on his behalf during the first months of his rule. During the regency, Makriyiannis came into conflict with the War Minister, the Bavarian Heideck, due to the latter's attitude towards the veterans of the War of Independence. In the newly restructured Hellenic Army, there was little place left for the irregular bands of klephts. These guerilla-styled fighters had formed the backbone of the Greek forces during the war, and Makriyiannis considered their exclusion from the newly formed army disrespectful. Furthermore, most of these men had been left with no resources after their exclusion from the military, and found themselves in a dire financial situation. Makriyiannis also believed that the Prime Minister, the Bavarian von Armansperg, was personally responsible for the serious problems faced by the newly formed state. As a consequence, Makriyiannis briefly retired from active politics.

After municipalities were first instituted by Royal decree on 27 December 1833, Makriyiannis was elected to the city council of Athens (the city becoming the new capital in 1834). In that capacity he harshly criticised, to the extent that it was possible, what he perceived as omissions and authoritarianism by the royal administration and Palace Cabinet. He often voiced his demand for constitutional rule, even though the royal administration had initially held him in high esteem and given him the rank of colonel. During the King's absence from Greece on the occasion of his marriage to Queen Amalia (late 1836 – early 1837), public discontent with von Armansperg was at its peak. The newspapers Athena and Elpis criticized him severely, and some politicians called for his removal. Makriyiannis, in his capacity as President of the Athens city council, proposed, in January 1837, the adoption of a resolution to be handed to the King upon his return requesting the granting of a Constitution. Not long before that, at a banquet attended by former fighters of the War of Independence, such as Kountouriotis, Kolokotronis and others, Makriyiannis had toasted the health of the royal couple, adding "may God enlighten them to rule us through constitutional laws, in accordance with the fatherland's sacrifices". Von Armansperg immediately dissolved the city council, fired Mayor Petrakis and had Makriyiannis placed under house arrest. Sometime during this period, Makriyiannis commissioned 25 engravings from the painter and veteran of the War of Independence, Panaghiotis Zographos. The profits from the sales were used to the benefit of veterans of the war.

Meanwhile, the demand for constitutional liberties was becoming widespread, as was discontent with King Otto's Bavarian administration. The situation escalated in the 3 September 1843 Revolution that led to the granting of the first Constitution. Makriyiannis was one of the three leaders of the movement. He played a crucial part in paving the way for this, having started as early as 1840. After its granting, he also played an important part in the forming of the new cabinet. He was elected as a representative of Athens to the National (Constitutional) Assembly, and headed an informal group of 63 representatives loyal to him. He personally proposed various recommendations during the course of the proceedings. Soon after the conclusion of the Assembly's work, however, he retired from politics. For his leading role in the creation of the first Greek Constitution, Makriyiannis was depicted on the reverse of the Greek 50 drachmas commemorative coin issued in 1994 for the 150th anniversary of this historic document. There are three versions of the coin, each featuring one of the three leaders of the 3 September movement: one features Makriyiannis, one colonel Dimitrios Kallergis, and one minister (and later prime minister) Andreas Metaxas.

Makriyiannis stopped working on his memoirs in 1850, so information about the rest of his life, including his trial, comes from other sources. He was always outspoken about his views, and as a result he stirred negative reactions among his opponents. He opposed what he perceived as a continued degradation of the veterans of the War of Independence, and had repeatedly been considered suspect of plotting against King Otho. Furthermore, the King never quite forgave him for his part in the 3 September movement. When summoned to the palace and asked to denounce all the conspirators of 1843, Makriyiannis refused, saying "I am not a slave". Eventually, in 1852, he was accused of planning to "overthrow the establishments and assassinate the King". On 13 April 1852 he was placed under house arrest, heavily guarded and with an officer posted in the room next to his own. On 16 March 1853 he was sentenced to death, in what has been called a "pre-fabricated trial". According to Vidal-Naquet, the prosecution brought up false testimonies and false evidence. Furthermore, the president of the tribunal, Kitsos Tzavelas, was a personal enemy of Makriyiannis. Five out of the six judges voted for the death sentence, and requested the King to extend royal clemency. His sentence was commuted to life imprisonment by the King, but he only spent 18 months in prison. King Otho reduced the sentence first to twenty, and later to ten years. He was finally pardoned and released on 2 September 1854, thanks to the Crimean War. The blockade of Peiraeus by the French and British fleets also led to the imposition of Kallergis as Minister of War, despite his previous attempts at overthrowing the King. Thus, Kallergis used his newly acquired influence to have Makriyiannis released. Makriyiannis suffered greatly in prison, and after his release suffered from hallucinations. His condition did not improve with the death of one of his younger sons in the cholera epidemic that struck Athens.

On 10 October 1862 a revolution broke out, which led to the eviction of King Otto from the country. Makriyiannis's son, the future general Othon Makriyiannis, reportedly presented his father with the King's golden crown. Makriyiannis was restored to the ranks he had been stripped of as a result of his trial, and was re-elected as a representative of Athens to the new National (Constitutional) Assembly of 1864. He was promoted to the rank of general on 20 April 1864, and died on 27 April.

== Literary work ==
=== Assessment and significance ===
Makriyiannis concluded work on his Memoirs in the years before his imprisonment; the last entries seem to be from September or October 1850, as evinced by his references to the events of that period. In the text of the Memoirs, one can see not only the personal adventures and disappointments of his long public career, but, more significantly, his views on people, situations and events, phrased clearly and quite often passionately. They were first published in 1907 by Yiannis Vlahogiannis, while some fragments of them had earlier been published in the newspaper Acropolis in 1904. Spyridon Lambros, in 1908, noted his straightforwardness and slight egotism, along with his holding firm to his own opinion (as quoted by Sphyroeras). Kostis Palamas, in 1911, called his work "incomparable in its kind, a masterpiece of his illiterate, but strong and autonomous mind" (ibid). Makriyiannis had received only the most basic and fragmentary education, and, according to his own testimony, mastered writing shortly before he started writing his Memoirs, while he was stationed in Argos.

Makriyiannis, having been ignored by history, and hardly mentioned by chroniclers of the War of Independence, had renewed interest in the revolution by offering a significant personal testimony to historical research. Despite this, after the initial interest in the newly published Memoirs, they were hardly cited for almost 40 years. One could say that Makriyiannis was forgotten, not only as a fighter, but also as the author of a text written in Demotic Greek; a text that, besides reproducing the heroic atmosphere of the War of Independence, is also a treasure-house of linguistic knowledge concerning the common Greek tongue of the time.

Makriyiannis's reputation was revived during the German occupation of Greece. In 1941, Yorgos Theotokas published an article on the general, calling his Memoirs "a monument of Modern Greek literature" because they were written in pure Demotic Greek. Two years later, in 1943, the Greek Nobel laureate Giorgos Seferis gave a lecture on him, saying:

In our times, ... when people seek to find in other people something clear and stable and compassionate, it is appropriate to speak of people such as Makriyannis.

— Giorgos Seferis, Dokimes (Essays)

According to the National Book Centre of Greece, Seferis also stated that Makriyiannis, along with Alexandros Papadiamantis, is one of the two greatest masters of modern Greek prose.

Since then hundreds of essays have been written on the subject of his Memoirs, and it would be fair to say that the chronicler has overshadowed the fighter, and with good reason, according to Sphyroeras. Spyros Asdrachas has noted that:

The fact that an illiterate man managed to use the Demotic speech ... to achieve an expressive density and dynamism entirely unusual of Greek prose made a terrific impression on people.

— Spyros Asdrachas, preface to Memoirs of General Makriyannis

The general's objectivity, however, has often been questioned. Vlahogiannis, in his preface to the Memoirs, praises his honesty and contrasts it to his lack of objectivity and impartiality. While always straightforward, Makriyiannis clearly holds a grudge against people he had come into conflict with. He often uses disparaging language against people like Kolokotronis, while staying silent about the more questionable deeds of people he had a favourable opinion of. According to Sphyroeras, however, his judgements do not stem from selfishness, but rather from his severity against those he considered were defaming the cause of Greece.

A few months after completing his Memoirs, on New Year's Eve in 1851, Makriyiannis started to write another "history", as he called it, which he interrupted rather abruptly in late March 1852, when he was under house arrest. This text was acquired in 1936 or 1937 by Vlahogiannis, and was finally published in 1983 by Angelos Papakostas, aptly titled Visions and Wonders. It has, according to Papakostas, far less historical significance than the Memoirs. The events described therein are given briefly, and are used only as an excuse for his meditations and the interpretation of his Visions, on which he particularly insists. Vlahogiannis, according to Sphyroeras, considered the manuscript to be an overzealous work of a deranged mind, and that is the reason he did not publish it. The work, however, is also the product of a physically and mentally tormented soul, who, being isolated at the age of 54, instead converses with God, the Panagia, and the saints. It also shows Makriyiannis's deep religious feeling; he turns away from guns, instead seeking the nation's salvation through divine intervention. Furthermore, as Sphyroeras points out, the work is unique in Modern Greek literature in its subject matter, and is, as the Memoirs, a significant source of linguistic and cultural information.

=== Works ===
- Ἀπομνημονεύματα (Memoirs) first published: Athens: 1907
- Ὁράματα καὶ Θάματα (Visions and Wonders) first published: Athens: 1983
