= Dimitrios Kallergis =

Greek politician (1803–1867)

- Δημήτριος Καλλέργης
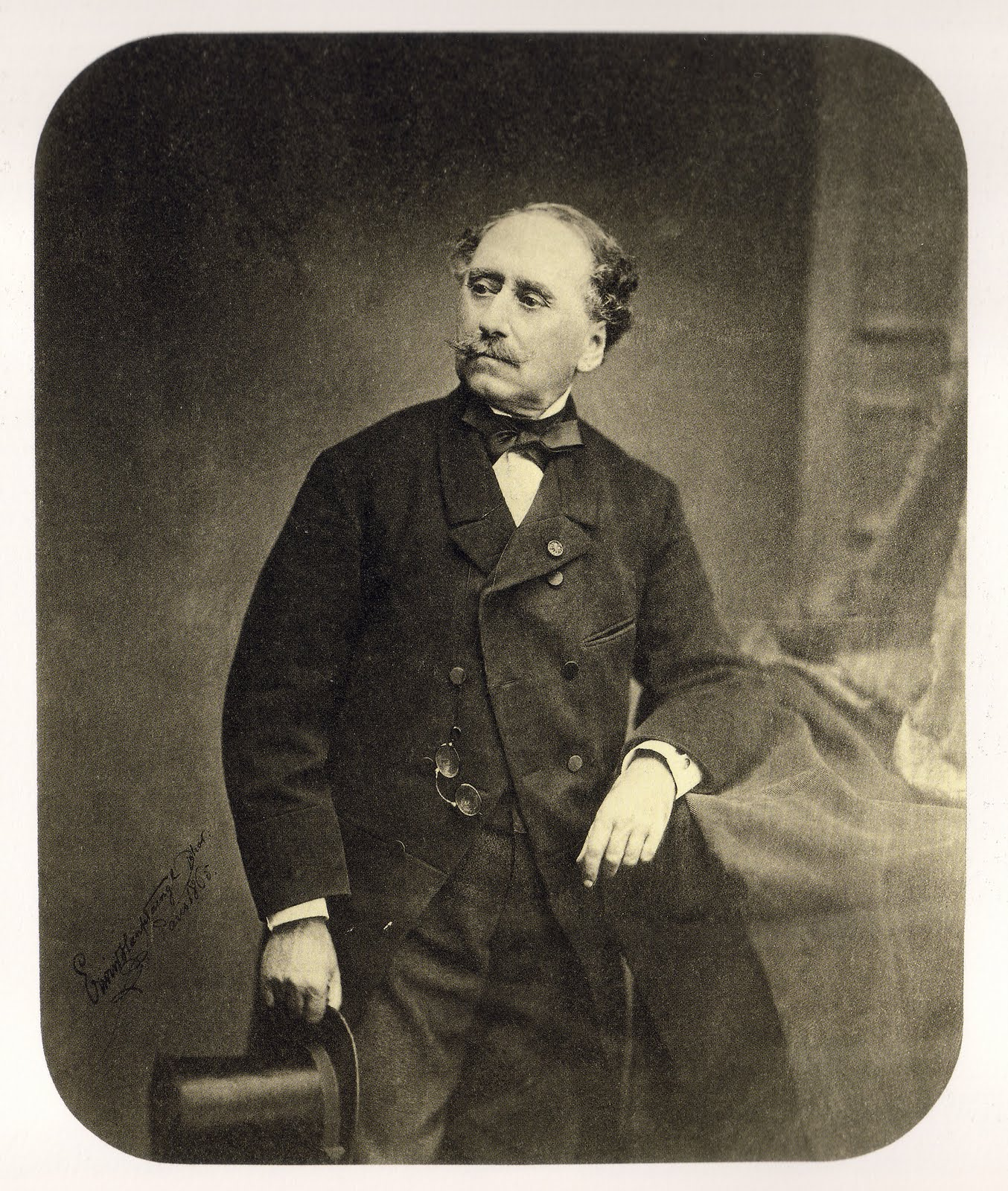
- Kallergis in Paris in 1865 photographed by André Disdéri

Minister of Military Affairs
- In office 1854–1855
- Monarch: Otto
- Prime Minister: Alexandros Mavrokordatos

Personal details
- Born: 1803 Eyalet of Crete, Ottoman Empire (now Greece)
- Died: 8 April 1867 (aged 63–64) Athens, Kingdom of Greece
- Resting place: First Cemetery of Athens
- Party: French Party; Russian Party
- Awards: Grand Cross of the Order of the Redeemer

Military service
- Allegiance: First Hellenic Republic; Kingdom of Greece
- Branch/service: Hellenic Army
- Years of service: 1821–1867
- Rank: Major General
- Battles/wars: Greek War of Independence; Battle of Kastella; Battle of Phaleron; 3 September 1843 Revolution

Dimitrios Kallergis (Greek: Δημήτριος Καλλέργης; 1803 – 8 April 1867) was a fighter of the Greek War of Independence, major general, politician and one of the most important protagonists of the 3 September 1843 Revolution.

== Life ==
=== Early life ===
Kallergis was born in 1803 in Crete. Hailing from the distinguished Cretan Kallergis family, a historic family of Mylopotamos, the roots of which lay in the Byzantine Empire and which had risen to prominence under the Venetian domination of the island. He was left fatherless at an early age and he was sent to Russia to the care of the Tsar's Minister of Foreign Affairs, Count Nesselrode, who appears in some sources is mentioned as his uncle. After completing his general studies he went to Vienna in order to study medicine. On the outbreak of the Greek War of Independence went to the Morea and joined the insurgents.

=== Greek War of Independence ===
On 19 January 1822 he disembarked with his relatives, Emmanuel and Nikolaos Kallergis, and the officer Valianos in Hydra bringing with them ammunitions, whose worth was 100.000 rubles and a recommendation letter of bishop Ignatius Oungrovlachias.

During the summer of 1825 he took on along with his compatriot Emmanuel Antoniadis the leadership of the campaign in Crete. On 2 August 200 revolutionaries occupied the fortress of Gramvousa, in which many pirates assembled during the next months. The campaign failed while, according to the American Philhellene Samuel Gridley Howe, Kallergis was unsuitable for the leader's position. Subsequently he participated in the expedition of Georgios Karaiskakis in Roumeli and he was distinguished. In October 1826 he participated in the failed attack of Colonel Fabvier against Thebes (it was sent as reinforcement by Karaiskakis).

On 30 January 1827 he took part in the victorious Battle of Kastella where he had significant contributions and on 20 February he defended strongly the area of the Three Towers, which was eventually conquered by the Ottomans but she had suffered several losses. He was captured by the enemy forces during the disastrous Battle of Phaleron, where he was leader of the Cretan fighters. Finally, he was released after his family paid a large sum for his ransom but during his captivity, one of his ears was cut by the Ottomans.

=== After Independence ===
During the government of Ioannis Kapodistrias, Kallergis was one of his supporters. He served as his adjutant and he proceeded to the organization of a regular body of the cavalry, where he became deputy commander. After the governor's assassination he had sided with Augustinos Kapodistrias and he actively participated in the civil conflicts of the time. During January 1832 he fought as a cavalry officer in the Battle of Argos and in March in the Battle of Loutraki where his forces and those of Nikitaras were defeated by the troops of Ioannis Kolettis.

At the same time, he followed a military career as an officer in the regular army while he was actively involved in the political issues of that period, first as a follower of the Russian Party and then of the French Party. In 1834, during the Bavarian regency and the Kolettis government he was imprisoned as a supporter of the Russian Party, whose significant members had made at that time various uprisings in the Greek territory.

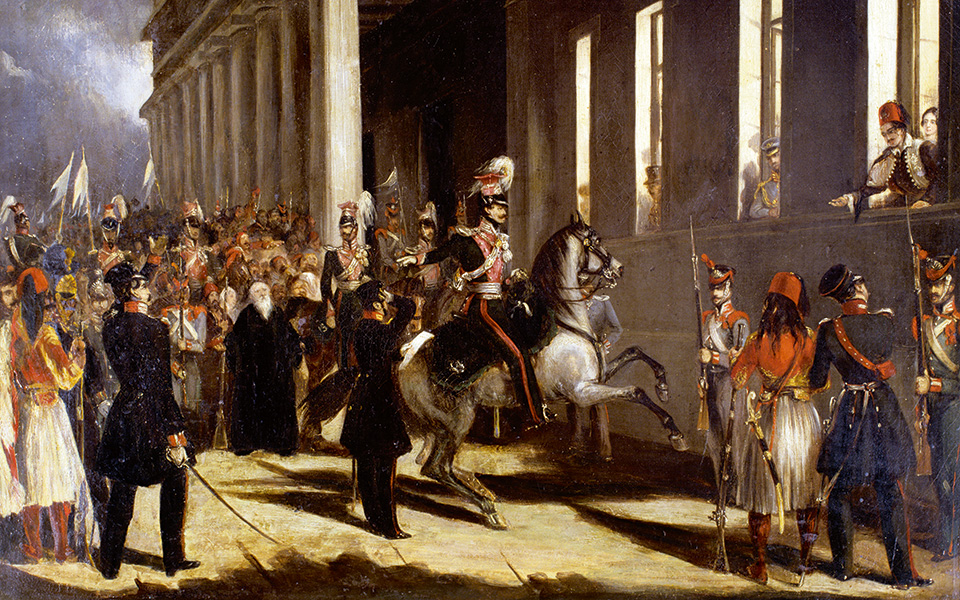
Kallergis depicted on horseback during the 3 September 1843 Revolution.

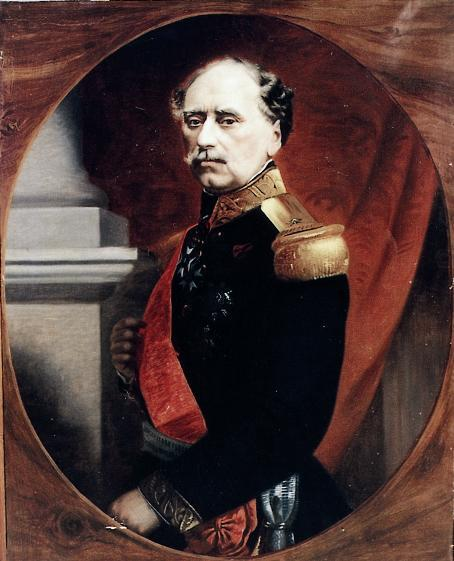
Kallergis in military uniform as a Major General.

In 1843, as colonel of the cavalry, he was a leading figure of the 3 September 1843 Revolution against Otto which forced the king to dismiss his Bavarian ministers and grant a constitution. He was appointed military commandant of Athens, promoted to major general and aide de camp to the king. In 1845 he was dismissed by the army and withdrew from Greece, following an incident between him and Queen Amalia. He went to London, where he became friend with Louis Napoleon, nephew of Napoleon I and later Emperor of the French, which he followed later in Paris and so he became follower of the French policy.

In 1848 he made an abortive descent on the Greek coast, in the hope of launching a revolution in the Greek kingdom. He was captured, but soon released and, after a stay in the island of Zante, went to Paris (1853). In 1854, during the Crimean War, he served as Minister of Military Affairs in the Alexandros Mavrokordatos cabinet—imposed by the British and French, and hence called "Ministry of Occupation" by the Greeks. Until Mavrokordatos' arrival, Kallergis exercised authority as a dictator, with the full support of the French occupation troops. This particular government recalled all the Greek officers who participated in the anti-Ottoman revolutionary movements in Thessaly, Epirus and Macedonia to return to Greece while by personal requirement of Kallergis, Otto's adjutants—Gennaios Kolokotronis, Spyromilios, Ioannis Mamouris and Gardikiotis Grivas—were dismissed, while the hitherto Minister of Military Affairs, Skarlatos Soutsos, was suspended.

When he was the minister, Kallergis formed for the first time in Greece a fire brigade. In September 1855, a serious episode of Kallergis with the royal couple entailed the fall of Mavrokordatos' government. In 1861 he was appointed minister plenipotentiary in Paris, in which capacity he took an important part in the negotiations which followed the fall of the Bavarian dynasty and led to the accession of Prince George of Denmark to the Greek throne.

In 1866 he participated in the two-day government of Dimitrios Voulgaris as Minister of Military Affairs. In mid-1866 he returned to Greece as chief equerry of King George I. He proposed to the king to assign him the Ministry of Foreign Affairs, arguing that with the help of the governments of France and Italy he would be able to accomplish the vision of the Megali Idea, but King George didn't believe it. In the summer of the same year he was elected by the Cretans as leader of the Cretan Revolt, but in September he refused the post because of health problems.

In January 1867 he was appointed as Ambassador of Greece to the United States but during the trip he fell ill in Paris and returned to Athens, where he died on 8 April 1867 of hemiplegia.

Kallergis was depicted on the reverse of the Greek 50 drachmas commemorative coin issued in 1994 for the 150th anniversary of the first Greek Constitution.
