= Trikala, Corinthia =

Village in Greece

Coordinates: 37.9883°N 22.4661°E

Trikala (Greek: Τρίκαλα Κορινθίας) is a village in Corinthia, in the Peloponnese peninsula of southern Greece. It comprises three settlements, Upper, Middle, and Lower Trikala, on the slopes of Mount Kyllini. The village belongs to the municipality of Xylokastro and is a popular tourist destination due to its natural environment and proximity to Athens.
