= Phalerum =

Ancient port of Athens

Phalerum Φάληρον
- Neighbourhood of South Athens, Greece
- Location within Greece
- Coordinates: 37°56′1.98″N 23°41′6.85″E

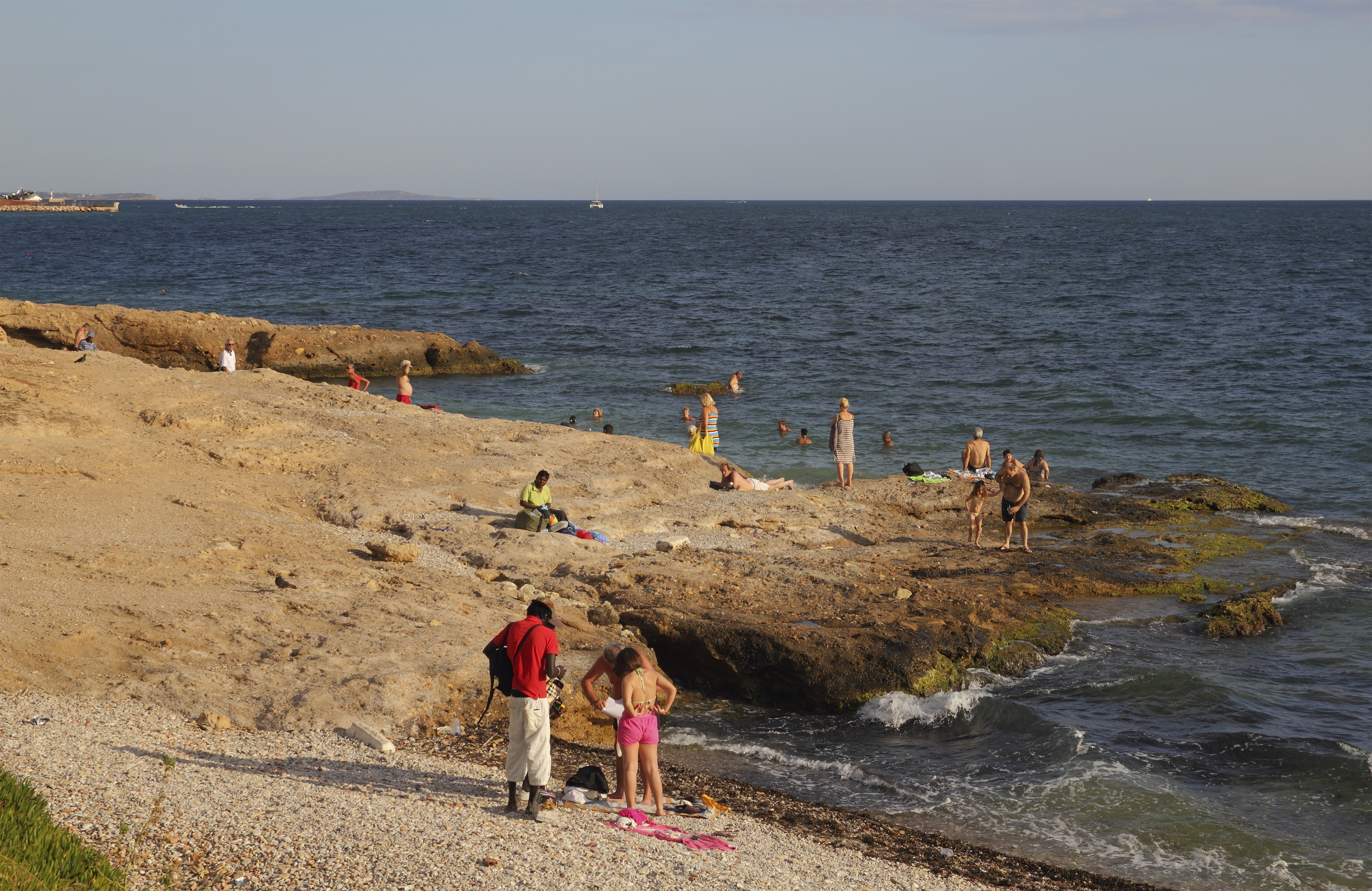
Phalerum Bay

Phalerum or Phaleron (Ancient Greek: Φάληρον Phálēron [pʰálɛːron]; Greek: Φάληρο (Fáliro), [ˈfaliro]) was a port of Ancient Athens, 5 km southwest of the Acropolis of Athens, on a bay of the Saronic Gulf. The bay is also referred to as "Bay of Phalerum" (Greek: Όρμος Φαλήρου Órmos Falíru).

The area of Phalerum is now occupied by the towns Palaio Faliro, Kallithea, Moschato and Neo Faliro, all of which are part of the Athens agglomeration.

Phalerum was the major port of Athens before Themistocles had the three rocky natural harbours by the promontory of Piraeus developed as alternative, from 491 BC. It was said that Menestheus set sail with his fleet to Troy from Phalerum, as did Theseus when he sailed to Crete after the death of Androgeus.

Recently, archaeologists have uncovered what appear to be traces of ancient Athens’s first port before the city’s naval and shipping centre was moved to Piraeus. The site, some 350 m from the modern coastline, contained pottery, tracks from the carts that would have served the port, and makeshift fireplaces where travelers waiting to take ship would have cooked and kept warm.

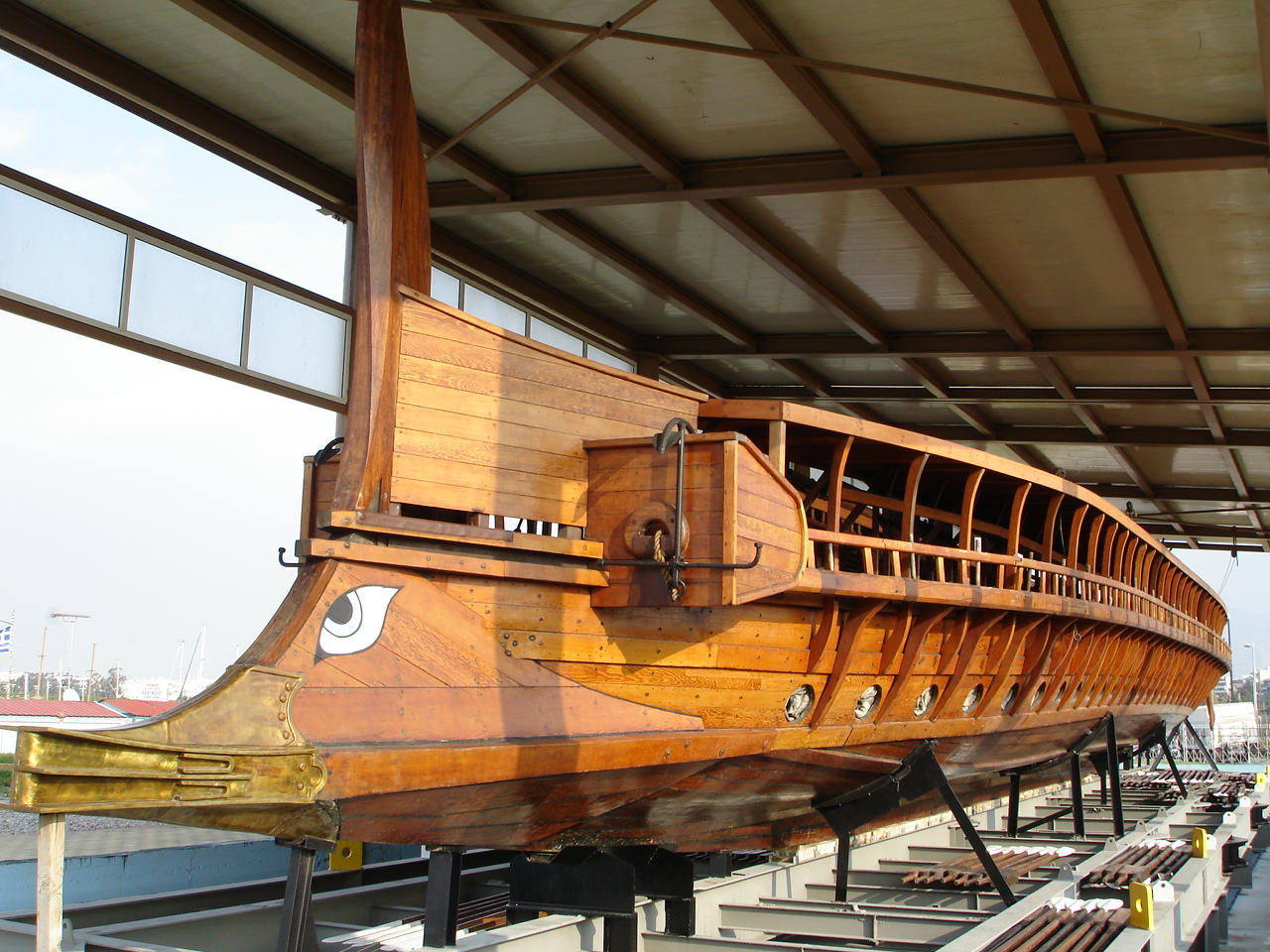
Olympias, a modern reconstruction of an ancient trireme naval ship.

The Park of Maritime Tradition, a collection of preserved historic ships, is located at the site. At the southern tip is the permanent anchorage of the armored cruiser HS Averof (now a floating museum), which was the admiralty ship of the Hellenic Navy during the Balkan Wars and World War I. Other museum ships include the Hellenic Navy destroyer HS Velos (D16), the old cable ship Thalis o Milisios (Thales of Miletos) and Olympias, a modern reconstruction of an ancient trireme naval ship.

== Notable people ==
- Demetrius of Phalerum, orator

== See also ==
- List of ancient Greek cities
