= 1757 =

1757 in various calendars
- Gregorian calendar: 1757; MDCCLVII
- Ab urbe condita: 2510
- Armenian calendar: 1206; ԹՎ ՌՄԶ
- Assyrian calendar: 6507
- Balinese saka calendar: 1678–1679
- Bengali calendar: 1163–1164
- Berber calendar: 2707
- British Regnal year: 30 Geo. 2 – 31 Geo. 2
- Buddhist calendar: 2301
- Burmese calendar: 1119
- Byzantine calendar: 7265–7266
- Chinese calendar: 丙子年 (Fire Rat); 4454 or 4247 — to — 丁丑年 (Fire Ox); 4455 or 4248
- Coptic calendar: 1473–1474
- Discordian calendar: 2923
- Ethiopian calendar: 1749–1750
- Hebrew calendar: 5517–5518
- Hindu calendars
- Vikram Samvat: 1813–1814
- Shaka Samvat: 1678–1679
- Kali Yuga: 4857–4858
- Holocene calendar: 11757
- Igbo calendar: 757–758
- Iranian calendar: 1135–1136
- Islamic calendar: 1170–1171
- Japanese calendar: Hōreki 7 (宝暦７年)
- Javanese calendar: 1682–1683
- Julian calendar: Gregorian minus 11 days
- Korean calendar: 4090
- Minguo calendar: 155 before ROC 民前155年
- Nanakshahi calendar: 289
- Thai solar calendar: 2299–2300
- Tibetan calendar: མེ་ཕོ་བྱི་བ་ལོ་ (male Fire-Rat); 1883 or 1502 or 730 — to — མེ་མོ་གླང་ལོ་ (female Fire-Ox); 1884 or 1503 or 731

1757 (MDCCLVII) was a common year starting on Saturday of the Gregorian calendar and a common year starting on Wednesday of the Julian calendar, the 1757th year of the Common Era (CE) and Anno Domini (AD) designations, the 757th year of the 2nd millennium, the 57th year of the 18th century, and the 8th year of the 1750s decade. As of the start of 1757, the Gregorian calendar was 11 days ahead of the Julian calendar, which remained in localized use until 1923.

== Events ==
=== January–March ===
- January 2 – Seven Years' War: The British East India Company Army, under the command of Robert Clive, captures Calcutta, India.
- January 5 – Robert-François Damiens makes an unsuccessful assassination attempt on Louis XV of France, who is slightly wounded by the knife attack. Damiens is executed on March 28.
- January 12 – Koca Ragıp Pasha becomes the new Grand Vizier of the Ottoman Empire, and administers the office for seven years until his death in 1763.
- January 17 – Ahmad Shah Durrani leads his Afghan forces to sack Delhi during his invasions of India.
- February 1 – King Louis XV of France dismisses his two most influential advisers. His Secretary of State for War, the Comte d'Argenson and the Secretary of the Navy, Jean-Baptiste de Machault d'Arnouville, are both removed from office at the urging of the King's mistress, Madame de Pompadour.
- February 2 – At Versailles in France, representatives of the Russian Empire and the Austrian Empire enter into an alliance against Prussia, with each nation pledging 80,000 troops. Other clauses to the treaty, not disclosed to the public, commit Austria to pay Russia one million rubles per year during the war to pay for the expenses of 24,000 of the Russian troops, and two million rubles upon the conquest of Silesia (a Prussian province that had been seized from Austria in 1746).
- February 3 – French artist Robert Picault begins the rescue of the frescoes at the King's Chamber of the Palace of Fontainebleau before architect Ange-Jacques Gabrel begins renovations.
- February 5 – The Nawab of Bengal, Siraj ud-Daulah, leads an attempt to retake Calcutta from the British. With just 1,900 soldiers and sailors, but superior cannon power, General Robert Clive forces the Nawab's much larger force into a retreat. The British sustain 194 casualties, but the Bengalis suffer 1,300.
- February 9 – The Nawab and General Clive sign the Treaty of Alinagar, with Bengal compensating the British East India Company for its losses and pledging respect for British control of India.
- February 22 – King Frederick V of Denmark issues an order to create a Lutheran mission for African slaves at the Danish West Indies (the modern-day United States Virgin Islands) at St. Croix.
- February 23 – A revolt against the government of King Joseph I of Portugal takes place in the city of Porto. After the riot's suppression, the King's minister, Sebastião José de Carvalho e Melo, 1st Marquis of Pombal, orders harsh punishments against the perpetrators, carried out in October.
- March 14 – British Royal Navy Admiral John Byng is executed by firing squad on board the ship HMS Monarch in the Solent after his court martial conviction for failing in the Battle of Minorca (1756) to save British troops who had been besieged by a numerically superior French force in the Siege of Fort St Philip. General Edward Cornwallis, the ranking British Army officer at the battle, is exonerated of charges of dereliction of duty, but his career is ruined. Byng's execution is the origin of the phrase "In this country, it is wise to kill an admiral from time to time to encourage the others", coined by Voltaire in his novel Candide.
- March 21 – Sweden signs an alliance treaty with France and Austria in the multinational effort to remove King Frederick the Great, even though Queen Consort Ulrika of Sweden is Frederick's sister. Sweden agrees to contribute 25,000 troops to the French and Austrian force.
- March 23 – The British East India Company takes control of Chandannagar and forces out the French Indian administrators.
- March 28 – Robert-François Damiens is tortured, then dismembered and his remains burned in public for his January 5 assassination attempt on King Louis XV of France, the last person in France to suffer this punishment.
- March 30 – The Rigshospitalet, national hospital of Denmark, is founded at Copenhagen.

=== April–June ===
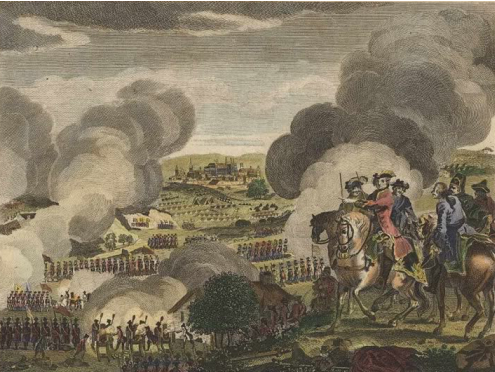
May 6: The Battle of Prague takes place as a Bohemian siege of the Bohemian capital.

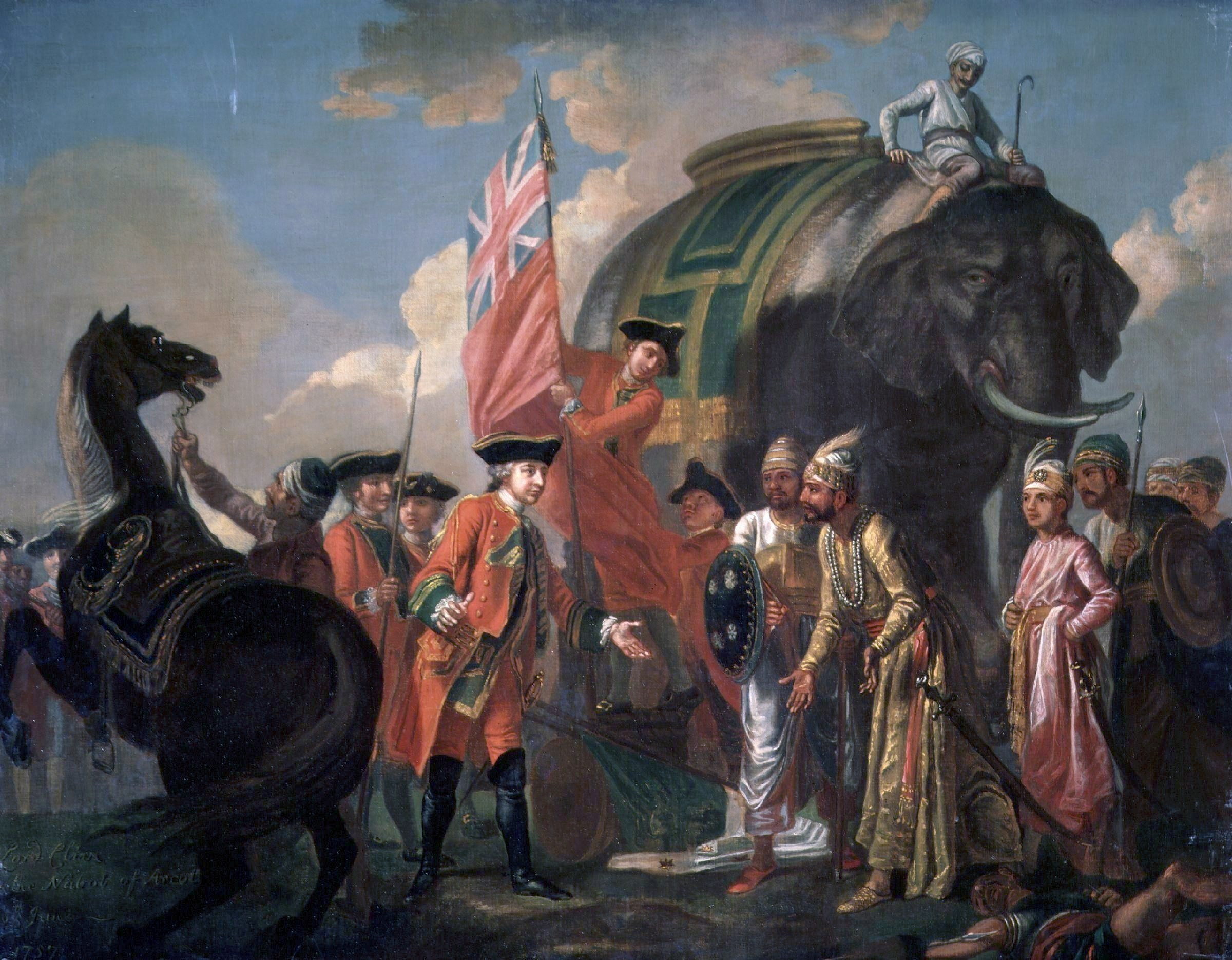
June 23: The Battle of Plassey takes place in India.

- April 6 – William Pitt resigns from the government of Great Britain after Prince William, Duke of Cumberland refuses to command the British forces in Germany in the Seven Years' War and following several military reverses in Britain's fight against France in America. A Caretaker Ministry takes power, led by William Cavendish, 4th Duke of Devonshire. Pitt is recalled to the government in early July.
- April 16
  - The works of astronomer Galileo Galilei espousing heliocentrism are removed (with the approval of Pope Benedict XIV) from the Index Librorum Prohibitorum list of books banned by Roman Catholic Church, along with "all books teaching the earth's motion and the sun's immobility". Other works of heliocentrists Galileo, Nicolaus Copernicus, Johannes Kepler, Diego de Zúñiga and Paolo Foscarini remain on the list.
  - In the wake of public unrest in France, the King's Council issues a decree that bars anyone from writing or printing anything that would tend toward émouvoir les esprits (stir up popular sentiment) against the government, with violations punishable by death.
- April 17 – The Spanish mission of Mission Santa Cruz de San Sabá is founded by Spanish missionary families on the banks of the San Saba River near modern-day Menard, Texas. Less than two years later, the European settlement is destroyed by the native Comanche Indians who lives in the area.
- April 21 – Battle of Reichenberg: Marshal Augustus William von Bevern enters Bohemia with a Prussian army (some 15,000 men). In Reichenberg he encounters the Austrians under the command of General Christian Moritz von Königsegg. Von Bevern defeats the Austrian troops and captures large quantities of supplies. He continues his advance on Prague.
- April 29 – Inside the house at Stratford-upon-Avon in England known as Shakespeare's Birthplace, a bricklayer, identified only as "Mosely", re-tiling the roof, discovers a supposed pro-Catholic testament of John Shakespeare, father of William Shakespeare, more than 150 years after the elder's death. The finding starts "what remains one of the most controversial topics in Shakespeare studies" because of disagreements over its authenticity and date.
- May 1 – France and Austria sign a second Treaty of Versailles, committing France to sending an additional 105,000 troops to the war against Prussia, and to pay expenses to Austria at the rate of 12 million florins annually.
- May 6 – Seven Years' War: Battle of Prague – Frederick the Great defeats an Austrian army, and begins to besiege the city.
- June 18 – Seven Years' War: Battle of Kolín – Frederick is defeated by an Austrian army under Marshal Daun, forcing him to evacuate Bohemia.
- June 23 – Battle of Plassey: 3,000 troops serving with the British East India Company under Robert Clive defeat a 50,000 strong Indian army under Siraj ud-Daulah with the help of Mir Jafar, at Plassey in India, marking the first victory of the East India Company over India, which lasts until 1857.
- June 25
  - The Duke of Devonshire resigns as Prime Minister of Great Britain after being unable to conduct governmental affairs without William Pitt.
  - The 1755 rebellion against the Chinese Empire by Mongolian Oirat Prince Amursana is met by a Chinese army of 10,000 attackers against Amursana's 2,500 man force at their capital at Bor Tal. The rebels hold out until July 17.

=== July–September ===
- July 2 – The Duke of Newcastle is asked to form a new government of Great Britain and fills the office of Prime Minister of Great Britain, after his forced resignation eight months earlier. Pitt is recalled to conduct Britain's foreign and military affairs and given greater control.
- July 17 – Amursana's Mongolian rebellion against the Chinese Empire is crushed after a battle of 17 days, and the survivors flee to Russia, where Amursana unsuccessfully seeks Russian aid.
- July 26 – Seven Years' War: Battle of Hastenbeck – An Anglo-Hanoverian army under the Duke of Cumberland is defeated by the French forces under Louis d'Estrées, and forced out of Hanover.
- August 3–9 – French and Indian War: A French army under Louis-Joseph de Montcalm forces the English to surrender Fort William Henry. The French army's Indian allies slaughter the surviving men, women and children.
- August 11 – In the Battle of Delhi, the capital city of the Mughal Empire is retaken by Maratha Empire leader Raghunathrao from Najib ad-Dawlah, who flees to refuge in the royal palace, the Red Fort.
- August 30 – Seven Years' War: Battle of Gross-Jägersdorf – A Prussian army under Hans von Lehwaldt is defeated by the Russian army under Marshal Stepan Apraksin.
- September 6 – The life of Najib ad-Dawlah is spared by Raghunathrao upon the intercession of General Malhar Rao Holkar. Najib and his family are permitted to leave the Fort along with most of their property, and the Emperor Alamgir II is restored to the Mughal throne as a nominal ruler.
- September 7 – Seven Years' War: Battle of Moys – A Prussian army (some 13,000 men) under Hans von Winterfeldt fights an Austrian army of double their size. The Prussians are defeated near Moys and von Winterfeldt is killed.
- September 8 – The Convention of Klosterzeven is signed at the Lower Saxony town of Bremervörde by the Duke of Cumberland following his defeat at Hastenbeck. The treaty provides for the army of the Electorate of Hanover to be reduced to a token force and for the French Army to occupy Hanover and most of northwest Germany. At the time, King George II of Great Britain is also the Elector of Hanover, and it is later said that "The terms proved worse than either George or his ministers had wanted or expected."
- September 13 – Pomeranian War: A column of troops from Sweden begins the surprise invasion of Prussia, setting up a pontoon bridge across the Peene River that marks the boundary between Swedish Pomerania and northern Prussia. After crossing at Loitz in the early morning hours, the troops march 10 kilometres (6.2 mi) and begin the occupation of the undefended Prussian town of Demmin. Hours later, another Swedish infantry regiment charges across the border into the Prussian town of Anklam, where the city gate had been left open.
- September 23 – The "Raid on Rochefort" is carried out as a pre-emptive strike by Great Britain to neutralize France's Arsenal de Rochefort before the French Navy can carry out plans to invade England. Led by Royal Navy Admiral Edward Hawke, HMS Neptune and six other vessels sail in and capture the Île-d'Aix and its battery of cannons, effectively blocking the departure of any ships from the mouth of the Charante river.

=== October–December ===
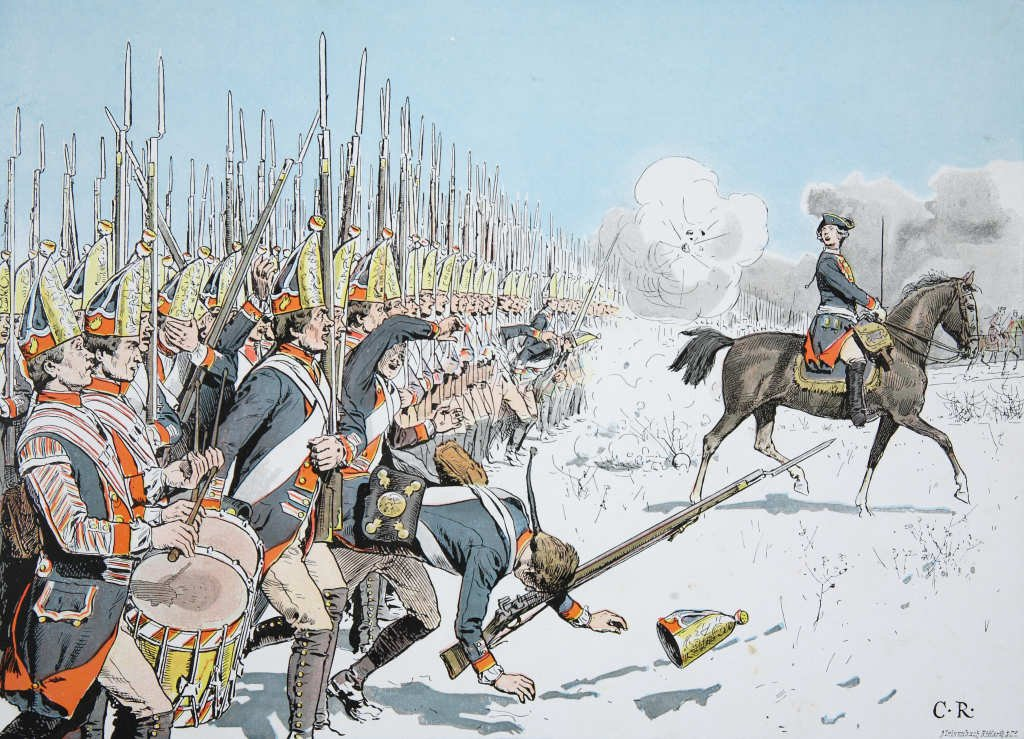
December 5: King Frederick of Prussia defeats the Austrian army in the Battle of Leuthen.

- October 4 – Bearing British flags, two French privateers sail up the Gambia River and attempt to capture the British fort on James Island, but their ruse is discovered the next day before they can stage their attack. The two ships are captured by the Royal Navy after retreating
- October 14 – Of the 478 people arrested, and 442 (including 50 women and young boys) convicted, for their roles in the Porto riot in February, 13 men and one woman are hanged; afterwards, their bodies are then quartered, and the severed limbs are publicly displayed on spikes. Another 49 men and 10 women are exiled to Portuguese colonies in Africa and India, and the other convicts are either flogged, imprisoned, or pressed into service rowing galley ships.
- October 16 – Seven Years' War: Raid on Berlin – Hungarian raiders (3,400 horseman) under Count András Hadik plunder Berlin. He demands that the city council pay a ransom of 200,000 thalers and a dozen pairs of gloves for Empress Maria Theresa. The Hungarians leave the Prussian capital after they received messages about a Prussian relief force under Prince Dietrich von Anhalt-Dessau, marching towards Berlin.
- October 24 (10 Safar 1171 A.H.) – 1757 Hajj caravan raid: Bedouin warriors of the Bani Sakher confederacy conduct a massive assault against a caravan of thousands of Muslim travelers who are on their way back to Damascus after the Hajj, the pilgrimage to Mecca. The attack, made at Hallat Ammar after the group has been resupplied at Tabuk, leads to the annihilation of 20,000 of the pilgrims. Those who are not killed outright die later in the desert from thirst and starvation. According to one Arabic source, the largest attack takes place on October 24.
- October 30 – Osman III dies, and is succeeded as Ottoman Sultan by Mustafa III.
- October 31 – News of the massacre of Muslim pilgrims first reaches Damascus; the Ottoman officials who had been in charge of protecting the pilgrimage are executed by beheading.
- November 5 – Seven Years' War: Battle of Rossbach – Frederick defeats the French-Imperial army under the Duc de Soubise and Prince Joseph of Saxe-Hildburghausen, forcing the French to withdraw from Saxony.
- November 10 – King Abdallah IV of Morocco dies and is succeeded by his son, who takes the throne as King Mohammed III and reigns until 1790.
- November 22 – Seven Years' War: Battle of Breslau – An Austrian army under Prince Charles Alexander of Lorraine defeats the Prussian army of Wilhelm of Brunswick-Bevern, and forces the Prussians behind the Oder.
- December 5 – Seven Years' War: Battle of Leuthen – Frederick defeats Prince Charles's Austrian army, in what is generally considered the Prussian king's greatest tactical victory.
- December 6 – In Buddhist tradition, Jigme Lingpa discovers the Longchen Nyingthig terma through a meditative vision, which brings him to Boudhanath. The Longchen Nyingtig is a popular cycle of teachings in the Nyingma school of Tibetan Buddhism.
- December 14 – Battle of Khresili: King Solomon I of Imereti defeats the Ottoman army and an allied faction of nobles, in what becomes western Georgia.
- December 24 – The Pratt-Yorke opinion distinguishes British overseas territories acquired by conquest from those acquired by private treaty: while the Crown of Great Britain enjoys sovereignty over both, only the property of the former is vested in the Crown.
- December 30 – James Abercrombie replaces James Mure-Campbell, 5th Earl of Loudoun as supreme commander in the British American colonies. Abercrombie is replaced himself, after failing to take the fort at Ticonderoga.

=== Date unknown ===
- Nam tiến, the southward expansion of the territory of Vietnam into the Indochina Peninsula, is concluded.
- A firman (decree) of Ottoman sultan Osman III (d. October 30) preserves the division of ownership and responsibilities of various Christian holy places in Jerusalem and Bethlehem (e.g. the former's Church of the Holy Sepulchre); this becomes established as the Status Quo in international law.
- Robert Wood publishes The ruins of Balbec, otherwise Heliopolis in Coelosyria in English and French, making the ancient city of Baalbek, Syria known to the West.
- Emanuel Swedenborg claims to have witnessed the Last Judgment occurring in the spiritual world.

== Births ==
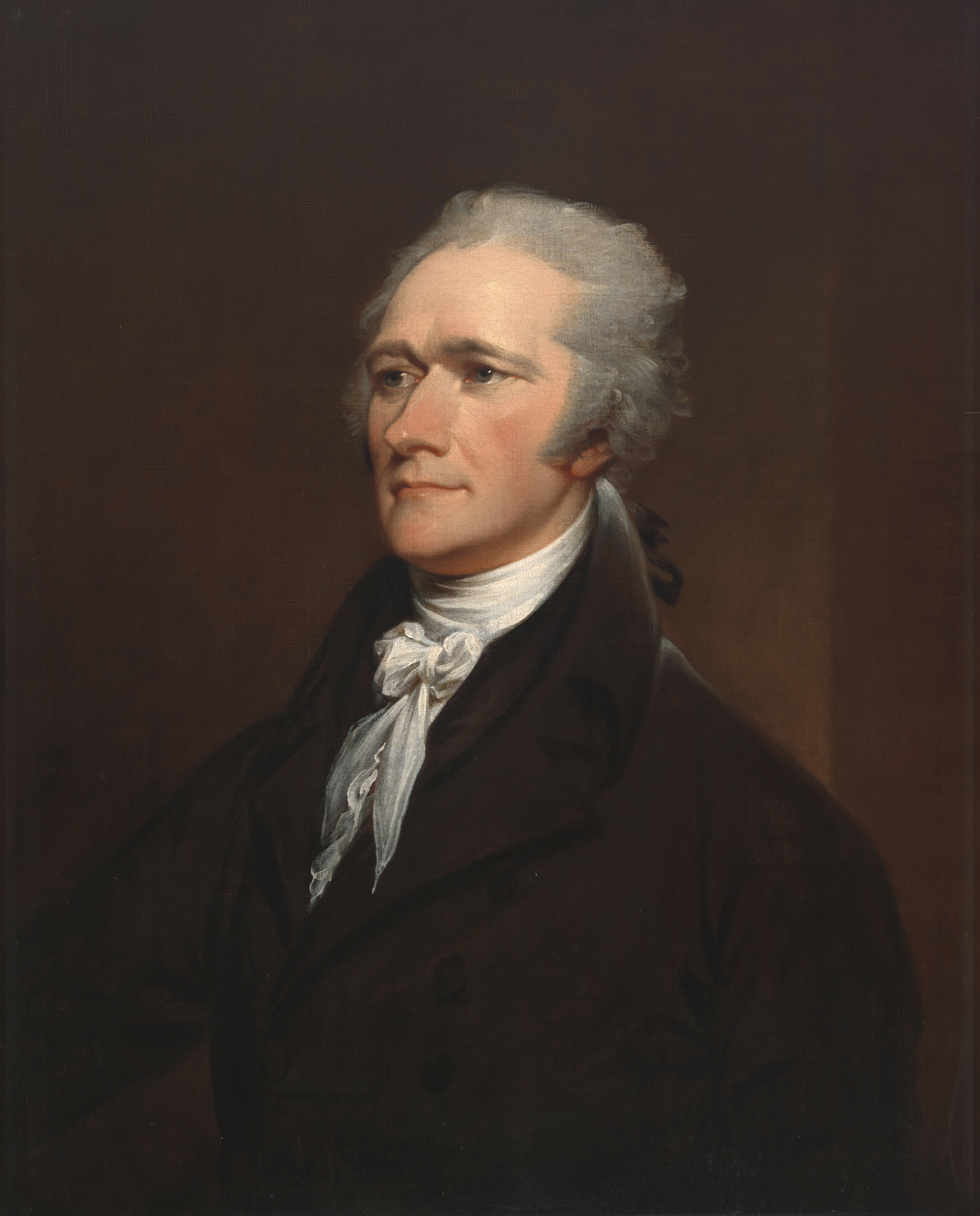
Alexander Hamilton

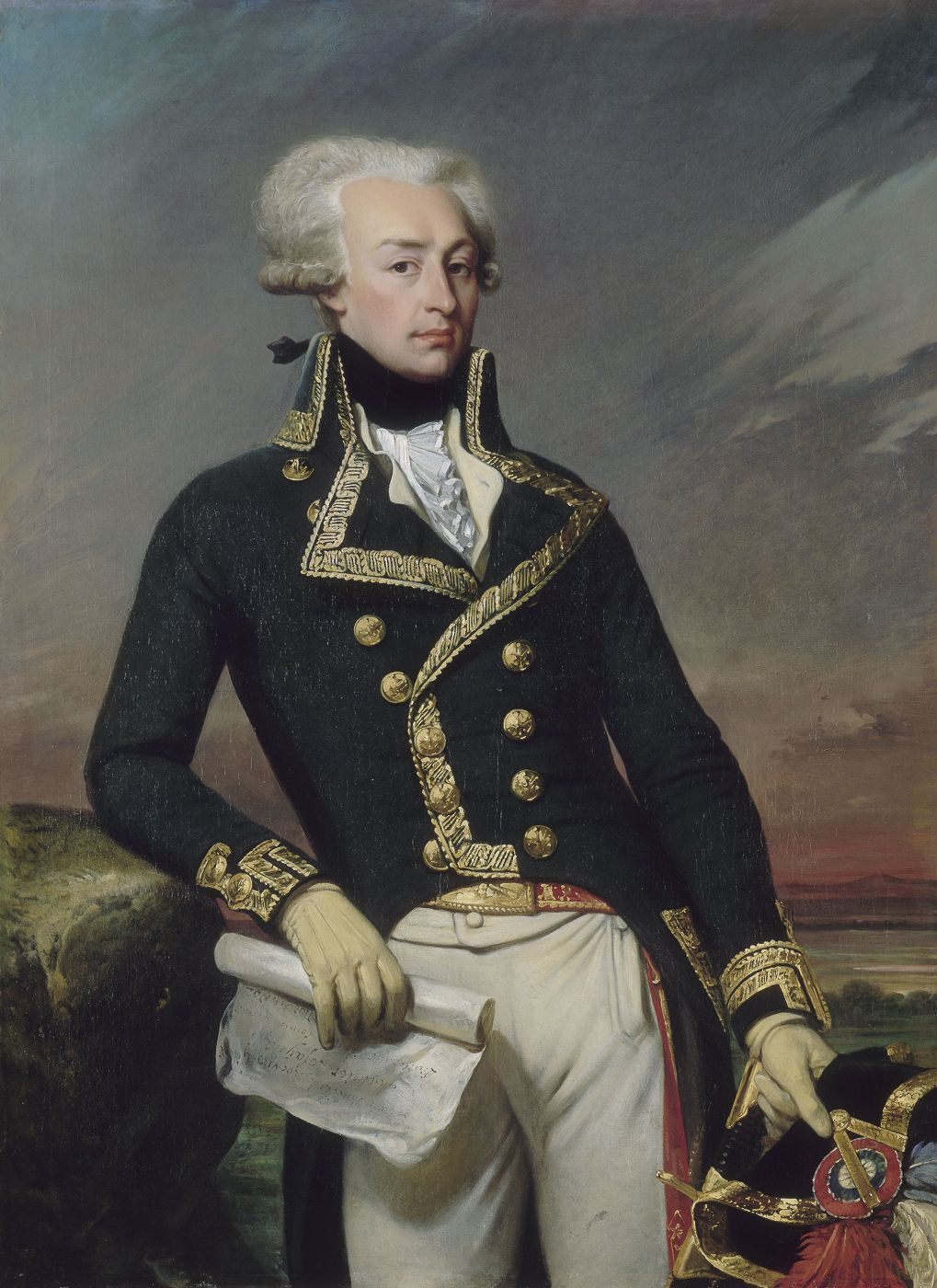
Gilbert du Motier, Marquis de Lafayette

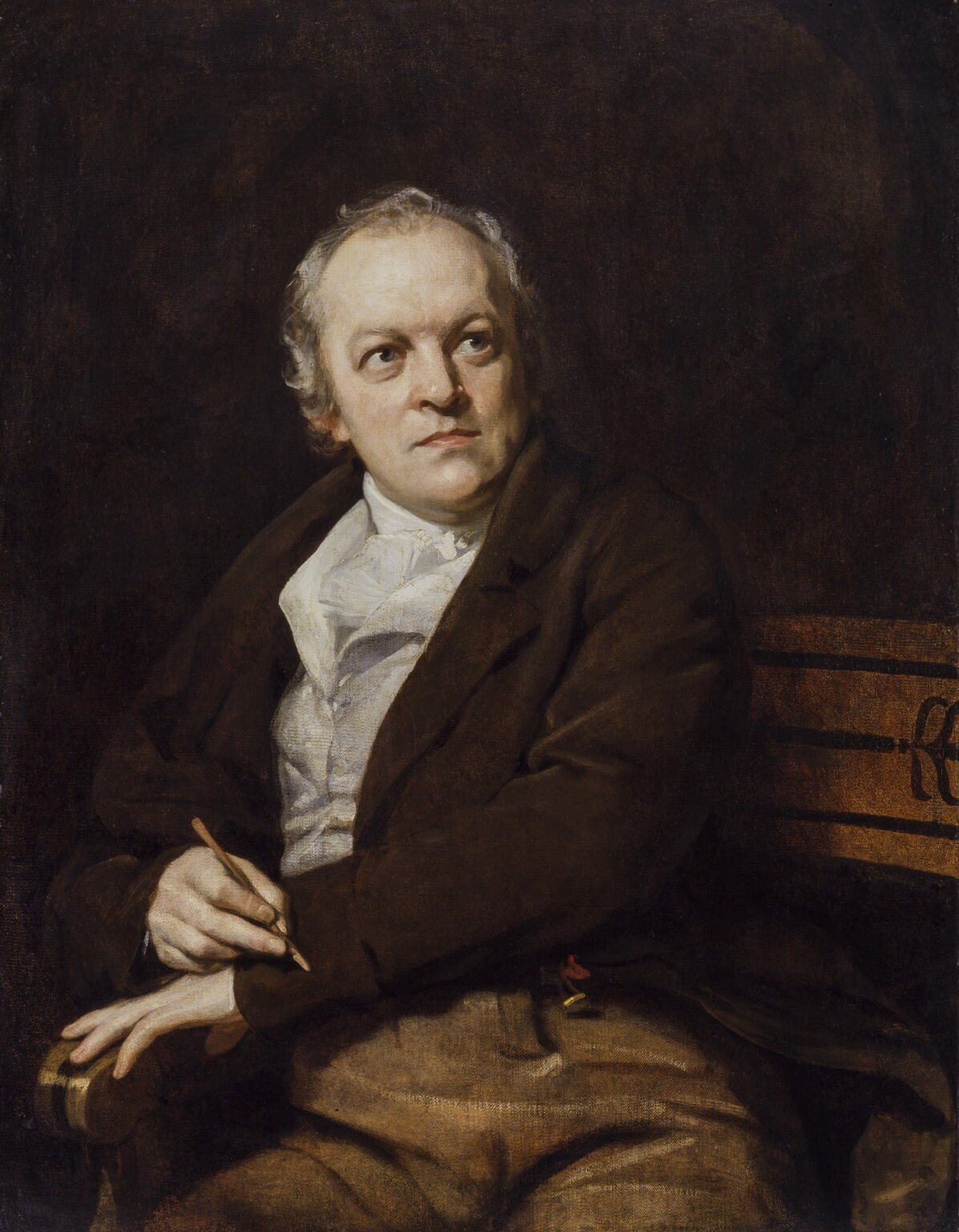
William Blake

- January 11 – Alexander Hamilton, first U.S. Secretary of the Treasury (most cited date of birth) (d. 1804)
- January 16 – Richard Goodwin Keats, British admiral, Governor of Newfoundland (d. 1834)
- February 3 – Joseph Forlenze, Italian ophthalmologist (d. 1833)
- February 20 – John 'Mad Jack' Fuller, English philanthropist (d. 1834)
- April 9 – Edward Pellew, 1st Viscount Exmouth, British admiral (d. 1833)
- April 28 – Edmund Butcher, English Unitarian minister (d. 1822)
- May 6 – Veronika Gut, Swiss rebel heroine (d. 1829)
- May 7 – Ludwig von Brauchitsch, Prussian general (d. 1827)
- May 25 – Louis-Sébastien Lenormand, French chemist, physicist and inventor (d. 1837)
- May 30 – Henry Addington, 1st Viscount Sidmouth, Prime Minister of the United Kingdom (d. 1844)
- June 18 – Gervasio Antonio de Posadas, Argentine leader (d. 1833)
- June 22 – George Vancouver, British explorer (d. 1798)
- July 20 – Garsevan Chavchavadze, Georgian diplomat, politician (d. 1811)
- August 9 – Elizabeth Schuyler, wife of Alexander Hamilton, co-founder of New York's first orphanage (d. 1854)
- August 9 – Thomas Telford, Scottish-born civil engineer, architect (d. 1834)
- August 23 – Marie Magdalene Charlotte Ackermann, German actress (d. 1775)
- September 6 – Gilbert du Motier, Marquis de Lafayette, French soldier, statesman (d. 1834)
- September 20 – Esther de Gélieu, Swiss educator (d. 1817)
- October 9 – King Charles X of France (d. 1836)
- October 21 – Charles-Pierre Augereau, Marshal of France and duc de Castiglione (d. 1816)
- November 1 – Antonio Canova, Italian sculptor (d. 1822)
- November 28 – William Blake, English poet and artist (d. 1827)
- December 7 – José Antonio Pareja, Spanish admiral (d. 1813)
- December 30 – Sebastián Kindelán y O'Regan, Spanish colonial governor (d. 1826)
- Date unknown
  - Agnes Ibbetson, English plant physiologist (d. 1823)
  - John Leamy, Irish–American merchant (d. 1839)

== Deaths ==
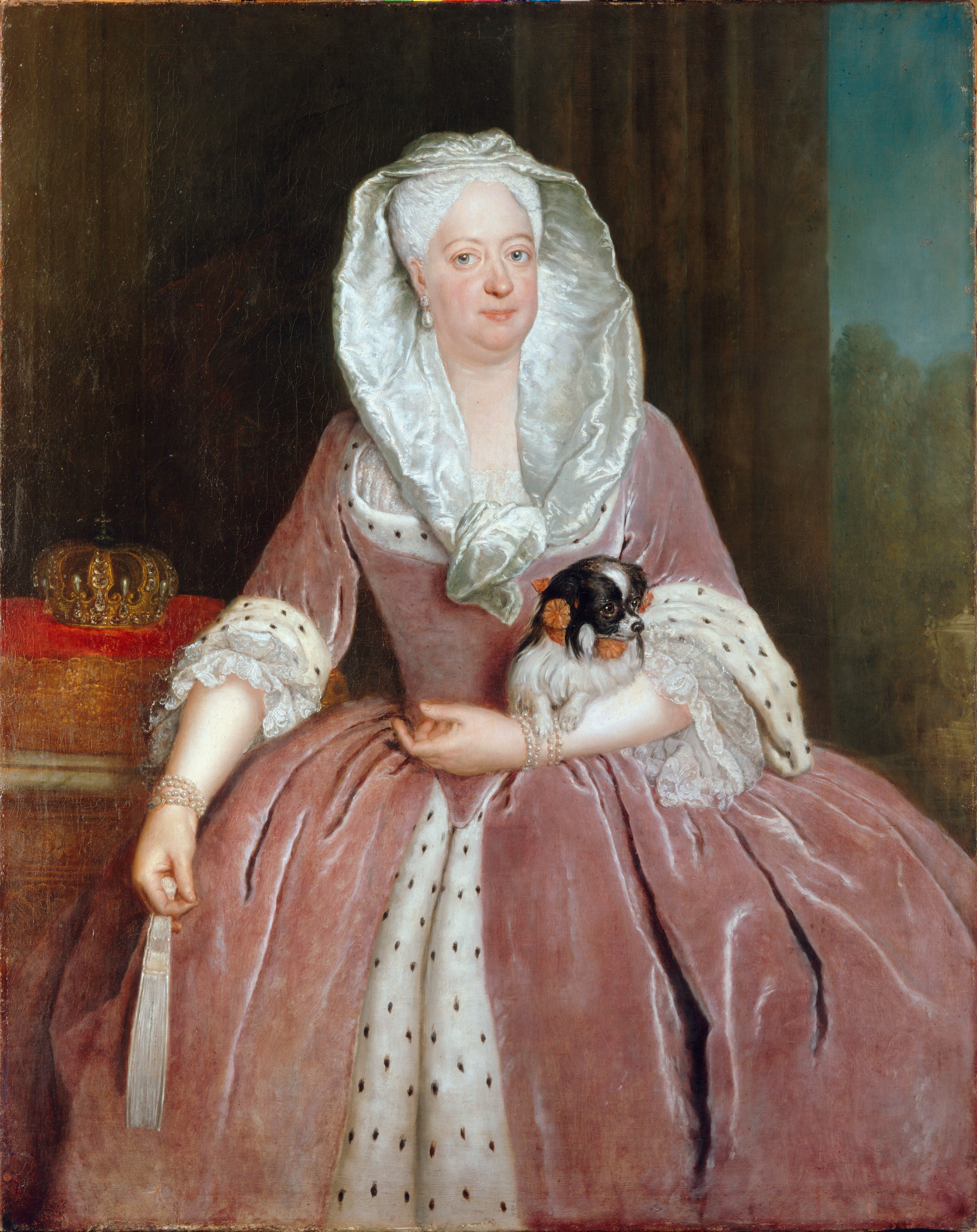
Sophia Dorothea of Hanover

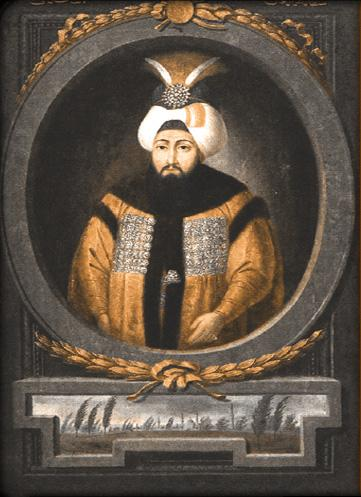
Sultan Osman III

- January 9 – Bernard Le Bovier de Fontenelle, French scientist, man of letters (b. 1657)
- January 19 – Thomas Ruddiman, Scottish classical scholar (b. 1664)
- February 5 – Horatio Walpole, 1st Baron Walpole, English diplomat (b. 1678)
- March 1 – Edward Moore, English writer (b. 1712)
- March 8 – Thomas Blackwell, Scottish classical scholar (b. 1701)
- March 12 – Giuseppe Galli Bibiena, Italian architect/painter (b. 1696)
- March 14 – John Byng, British admiral (executed) (b. 1704)
- March 27 – Johann Stamitz, Czech-born composer (b. 1717)
- March 28 – Robert-François Damiens, French domestic servant, executed for the attempted assassination of Louis XV (b. 1715)
- April 4 – Spencer Phips, Acting governor of the Province of Massachusetts Bay (b. 1685)
- April 20 – Paul Alphéran de Bussan, French bishop (b. 1684)
- May 6
  - Maximilian Ulysses Count Browne, Austrian field marshal (b. 1705)
  - Charles FitzRoy, 2nd Duke of Grafton, British politician (b. 1683)
  - Kurt Christoph Graf von Schwerin, Prussian field marshal (b. 1684)
- June 28 – Sophia Dorothea of Hanover, queen consort of Frederick William I (b. 1687)
- July 2 – Siraj ud-Daulah, the last independent ruler of Bengal of undivided India (b. 1733)
- July 8 – Daniel Parke Custis, American planter (b. 1711)
- July 23 – Domenico Scarlatti, Italian composer (b. 1685)
- August 3 – Charles William Frederick, Margrave of Brandenburg-Ansbach (b. 1712)
- August 17 – Aaron Cleveland, American clergyman (b. 1715)
- August 28 – David Hartley, English philosopher (b. 1705)
- August 30 – Bulleh Shah, Sufi poet (b. 1680)
- September 24 – Aaron Burr Sr., President of Princeton University (b. 1716)
- October 2 – Aloysius Centurione, Italian Jesuit (b. 1686)
- October 17 – René Antoine Ferchault de Réaumur, French scientist (b. 1683)
- October 25 – Antoine Augustin Calmet, French theologian (b. 1672)
- October 30
  - Osman III, Ottoman Sultan (b. 1699)
  - Edward Vernon, English naval officer (b. 1684)
- December 11
  - Colley Cibber, English poet laureate, actor-manager (b. 1671)
  - Edmund Curll, English bookseller, publisher (b. 1675)
- December 14 – Levan Abashidze, Georgian politician
- December 15 – John Dyer, Welsh poet (b. 1699)
- December 28 – Princess Caroline of Great Britain, fourth child and third daughter of George II (b. 1713)
- Date unknown – Rika Maja, Sami shaman (b. 1661)
