= 1822 =

1822 in various calendars
- Gregorian calendar: 1822; MDCCCXXII
- Ab urbe condita: 2575
- Armenian calendar: 1271; ԹՎ ՌՄՀԱ
- Assyrian calendar: 6572
- Balinese saka calendar: 1743–1744
- Bengali calendar: 1228–1229
- Berber calendar: 2772
- British Regnal year: 2 Geo. 4 – 3 Geo. 4
- Buddhist calendar: 2366
- Burmese calendar: 1184
- Byzantine calendar: 7330–7331
- Chinese calendar: 辛巳年 (Metal Snake); 4519 or 4312 — to — 壬午年 (Water Horse); 4520 or 4313
- Coptic calendar: 1538–1539
- Discordian calendar: 2988
- Ethiopian calendar: 1814–1815
- Hebrew calendar: 5582–5583
- Hindu calendars
- Vikram Samvat: 1878–1879
- Shaka Samvat: 1743–1744
- Kali Yuga: 4922–4923
- Holocene calendar: 11822
- Igbo calendar: 822–823
- Iranian calendar: 1200–1201
- Islamic calendar: 1237–1238
- Japanese calendar: Bunsei 5 (文政５年)
- Javanese calendar: 1749–1750
- Julian calendar: Gregorian minus 12 days
- Korean calendar: 4155
- Minguo calendar: 90 before ROC 民前90年
- Nanakshahi calendar: 354
- Thai solar calendar: 2364–2365
- Tibetan calendar: ལྕགས་མོ་སྦྲུལ་ལོ་ (female Iron-Snake); 1948 or 1567 or 795 — to — ཆུ་ཕོ་རྟ་ལོ་ (male Water-Horse); 1949 or 1568 or 796

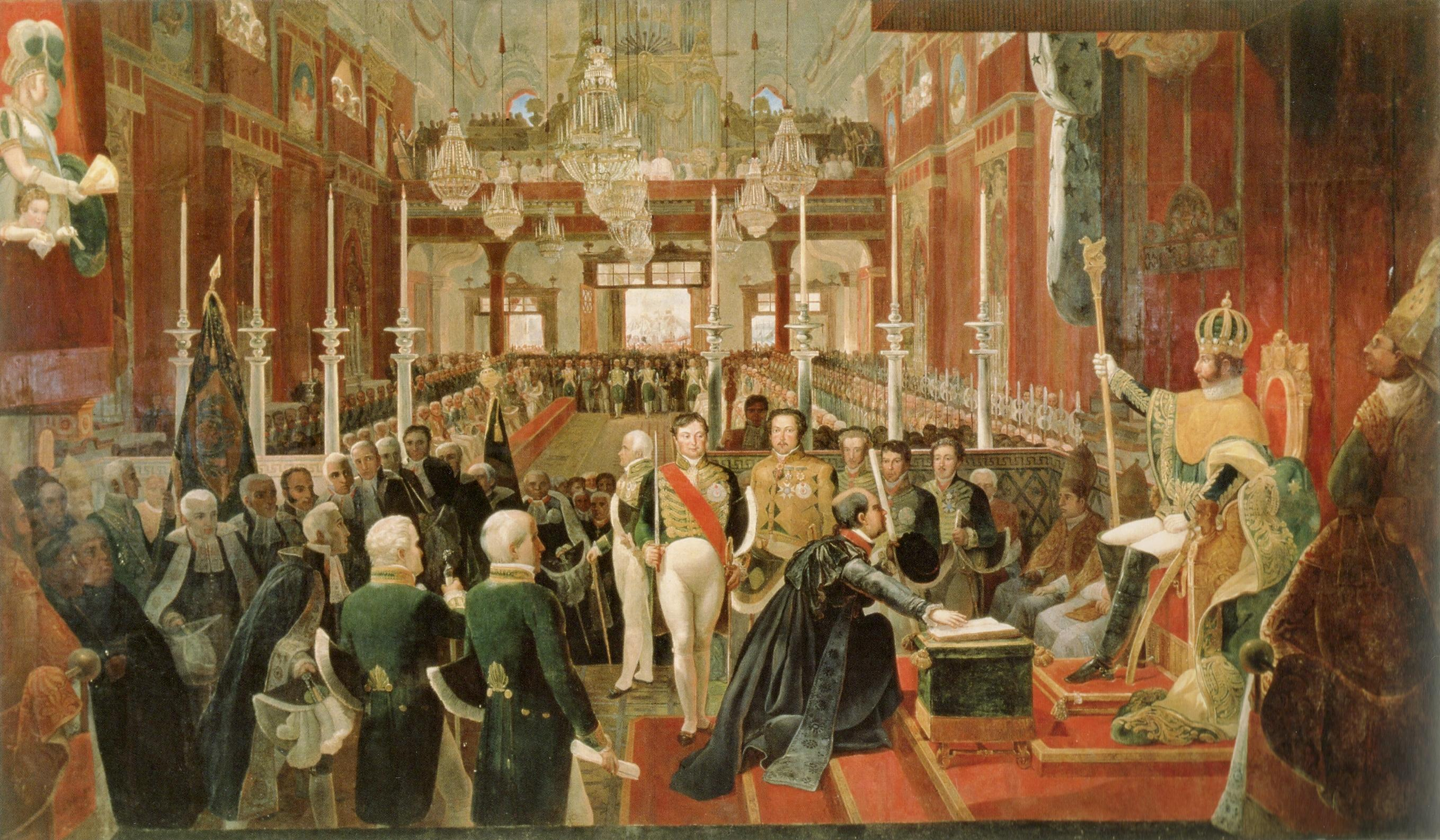
December 1: Dom Pedro I is crowned as the first Emperor of Brazil.

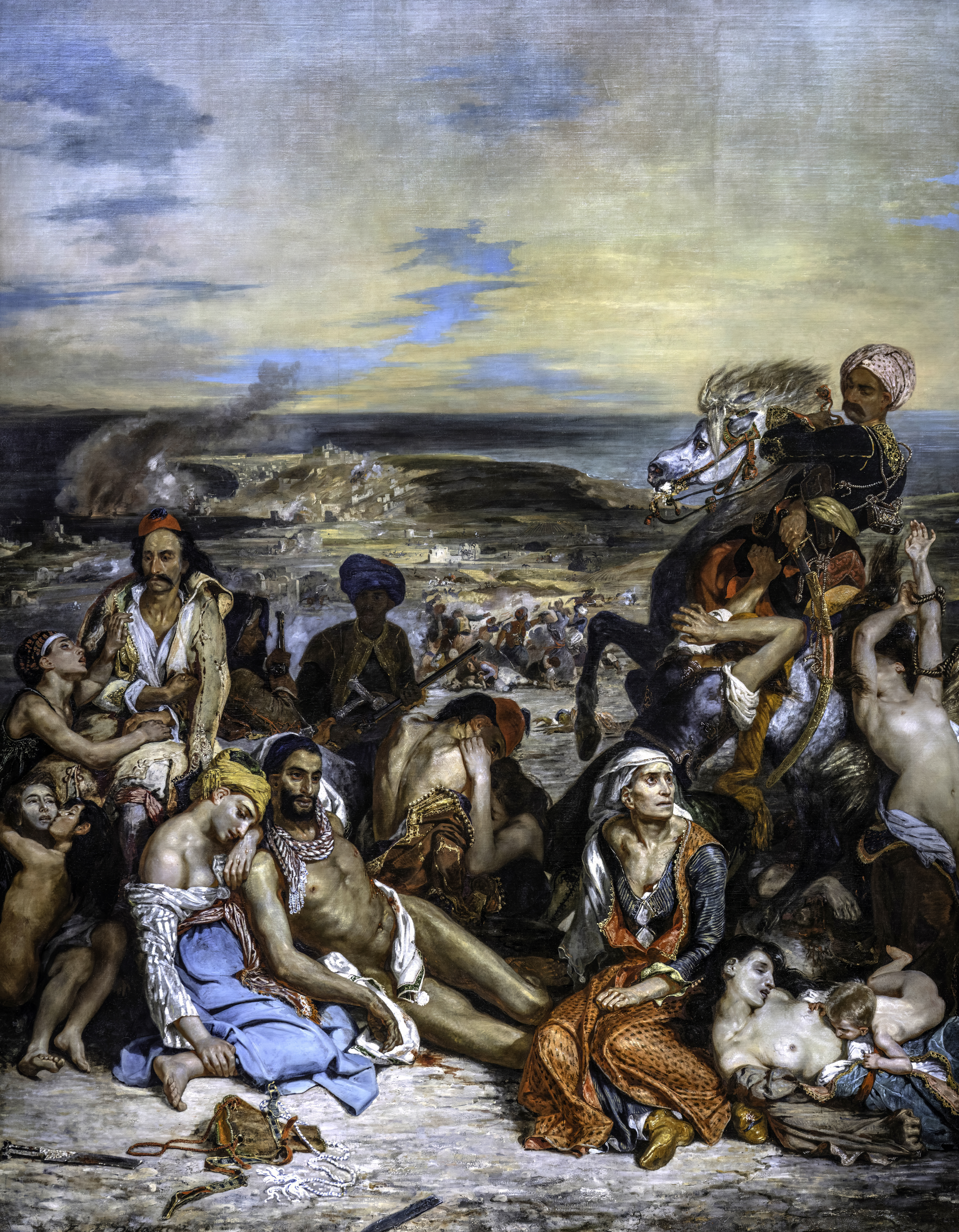
March 31: The Chios massacre of more than 20,000 Greek residents of Chios is carried out by Ottoman Empire troops.

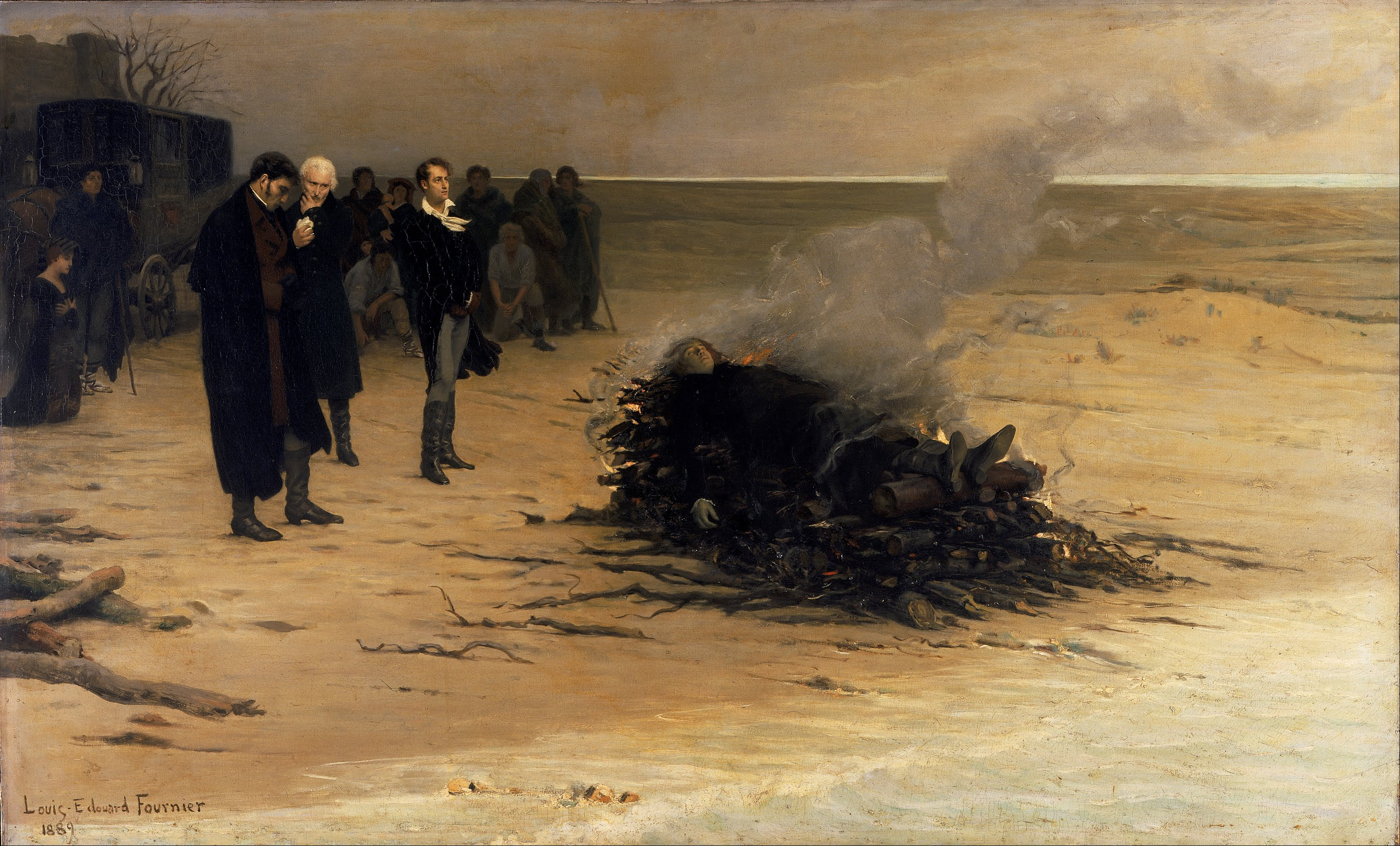
August 16: Funeral of Shelley

1822 (MDCCCXXII) was a common year starting on Tuesday of the Gregorian calendar and a common year starting on Sunday of the Julian calendar, the 1822nd year of the Common Era (CE) and Anno Domini (AD) designations, the 822nd year of the 2nd millennium, the 22nd year of the 19th century, and the 3rd year of the 1820s decade. As of the start of 1822, the Gregorian calendar was 12 days ahead of the Julian calendar, which remained in localized use until 1923.

== Events ==
=== January–March ===
- January 1 – The Greek Constitution of 1822 is adopted by the First National Assembly at Epidaurus.
- January 3 – The famous French explorer, Aimé Bonpland, is imprisoned in Paraguay on charges of espionage.
- January 7 – The first freed slaves from the United States arrive on the west coast of Africa, founding Monrovia on April 25.
- January 9 – The Portuguese prince Pedro I of Brazil decides to stay in Brazil against the orders of the Portugal's King João VI, beginning the Brazilian independence process.
- January 13 – The design of the modern-day flag of Greece is adopted by the First National Assembly at Epidaurus, for their naval flag.
- January 14 – Greek War of Independence: Acrocorinth is captured by Theodoros Kolokotronis and Demetrios Ypsilantis.
- February 6 – The Chinese junk Tek Sing sinks in the South China Sea, drowning more than 1,800 people on board. The wreckage will not be located until 1999.
- February 9 – The invading Haitian forces, led by Jean-Pierre Boyer, arrive in Santo Domingo, to overthrow the newly founded Dominican Republic.
- February 24 – The first Swaminarayan temple, Kalupur Swaminarayan Mandir at Ahmedabad in the British Raj, is inaugurated.
- March 19
  - The Holy Alliance sends the Ottoman Empire a final ultimatum after Ottoman repression of Austrian subjects in Bucharest during the Wallachian uprising, otherwise facing war with Austria.
  - Boston, Massachusetts, is incorporated as a city following a vote.
- March 31 – Greek War of Independence – Chios massacre: 20,000 Greeks on the island of Chios are slaughtered by Ottoman troops, and 23,000 more are exiled.

=== April–June ===
- April 25 – The American Colonization Society lands at Cape Mesurado on the West African coast, after purchasing 60 miles (97 km) of coastline. The settlement will soon become Monrovia, as the nation of Liberia is established to fill the ACS mission of freeing black American slaves and sending them "back to Africa".
- April 30 – George Canning, President of the Board of Control in the House of Commons, moves to repeal a law that prohibited Roman Catholic peers from sitting or voting in the House of Lords. The motion passes, 235–223, on its second reading, but the House of Lords declines to pass it.
- May 16 – Nairs, the upper caste in British Raj, attack Sandar women for covering their upper body and breasts.
- May 24 – Battle of Pichincha: Simón Bolívar secures the independence of Quito.
- May 25 – Christos Palaskas and Alexis Noutsos are executed by Odysseas Androutsos' forces.
- May 26 – Grue Church fire: The biggest fire disaster in Norway's history kills 116 people.
- June 6 – Alexis St. Martin is accidentally shot in the stomach, which leads the way to William Beaumont's studies on digestion.
- June 18 – Greek War of Independence: Konstantinos Kanaris blows up the Ottoman navy's flagship at Chios, killing the Kapudan Pasha Nasuhzade Ali Pasha.

=== July–September ===
- July 3 – Charles Babbage publishes a proposal for a difference engine, a forerunner of the modern computer, for calculating logarithms and trigonometric functions. Construction of an operational version will proceed under British Government sponsorship (1823–1832), but it will never be completed.
- July 7 – July 1822 Spanish coup d'état, an attempt by supporters of Ferdinand VII to overthrow the Liberal government of Spain, fails.
- July 8 – The Chippewa people cede a huge tract of land in Ontario to British control.
- July 13 – Greek War of Independence: Greek soldiers defeat Ottoman forces at Thermopylae.
- July 26 – Guayaquil Conference: José de San Martín arrives in Guayaquil, Ecuador, to meet Simón Bolívar.
- July 27 – Guayaquil Conference: Simón Bolívar and General José de San Martín meet in Guayaquil, which Bolívar later annexes.
- July 31 – The last public whipping is carried out in Edinburgh.
- August 5–13 – A sequence of earthquakes occurs in the northern part of the Ottoman Empire, causing severe damage from Gaziantep to Antakya in modern Turkey and from Aleppo to Khan Sheikhun in modern Syria. At least 20,000 people are killed.
- August 12
  - Lord Castlereagh, the British Foreign Secretary, commits suicide at his house in Kent. He is judged to have been insane at the time.
  - St David's College (the modern-day University of Wales, Lampeter) is founded in Wales by Thomas Burgess, Bishop of St David's.
- August 15 — The visit of King George IV to Scotland begins and lasts until –August 29.
- August 16 — The body of British poet Percy Bysse Shelley, who died on July 8 in the sinking of his boat Don Juan, is cremated at the beach, 10 days after his decomposed remains had washed ashore in Italy near Viareggio, in the presence of Lord Byron and Edward John Trelawny, who claims to have seized Shelley's heart from the flames.
- August 22 – The English ship Orion lands at Yerba Buena on the North American west coast of Mexico, under the command of William A. Richardson. The area is later acquired by the U.S. and becomes the site of San Francisco.
- September 7 – Brazil declares its independence from Portugal.
- September 8–13 – Battle of Nauplia: In a series of naval engagements, the Ottoman Fleet fails to break through the Greek Fleet, under Admiral Andreas Vokos Miaoulis.
- September 11 – The Roman Catholic Church first permits the publication of Galileo Galilei's 1632 treatise, Dialogue Concerning the Two Chief World Systems.)
- September 16
  - George Canning is appointed British Secretary of State for Foreign Affairs.
  - The Constituent Congress of Peru begins its first session.
- September 22 – Portugal approves its first Constitution.
- September 27 – Jean-François Champollion announces his success in deciphering Egyptian hieroglyphs, using the Rosetta Stone, in a letter to the Académie des Inscriptions et Belles-Lettres in Paris (based on the work of Thomas Young).

=== October–December ===
- October 8 – The Galunggung volcano erupts on West Java, and is followed four days later by a second, more violent outburst. The two events kill more than 4,000 people and destroy 114 villages.
- October 12 – Pedro, Crown Prince of Portugal, is declared the constitutional Emperor of Brazil, as Pedro the First.
- October 20 – The Congress of Verona opens in the Austrian-ruled province of Lombardy-Venetia. The event is the largest diplomatic gathering since the Congress of Vienna seven years earlier. The Congress lasts until December 14, and Russia, Austria and Prussia approve French intervention in Spain.
- October 21 – The volcano Mount Vesuvius near Naples erupts.
- October 31 – Emperor Agustín de Iturbide of the First Mexican Empire dissolves the country's Congress of the Union, and replaces it with a military junta.
- November 9 – Action of 9 November 1822: USS Alligator (1820) engages three pirate schooners off Cuba, as part of the West Indies anti-piracy operations of the United States.
- November 13
  - Greek War of Independence: Nafplio falls to the Greek rebels.
  - The Congregation of St. Basil is founded in France.
- November 19 – An earthquake near Valparaíso in Chile kills around 200 people, causes a tsunami and raises the coastal area.
- November 22 – A fire in Guangzhou (Canton) kills 500 people, and destroys 13,070 homes and several European-owned businesses.
- December 1 – Pedro I is crowned as the first Emperor of Brazil.
- December 14 – The Congress of Verona ends having endorsed French Intervention in Spain

=== Date unknown ===
- Over the middle of the year Franz Schubert begins writing his Symphony No. 8, but leaves it unfinished.
- The Rocky Mountain Fur Company (Ashley's Hundred) leave from St. Louis, Missouri, setting off a major increase in fur trade.
- The fifth and last prohibition of coffee in Sweden is lifted.

== Births ==
=== January–June ===
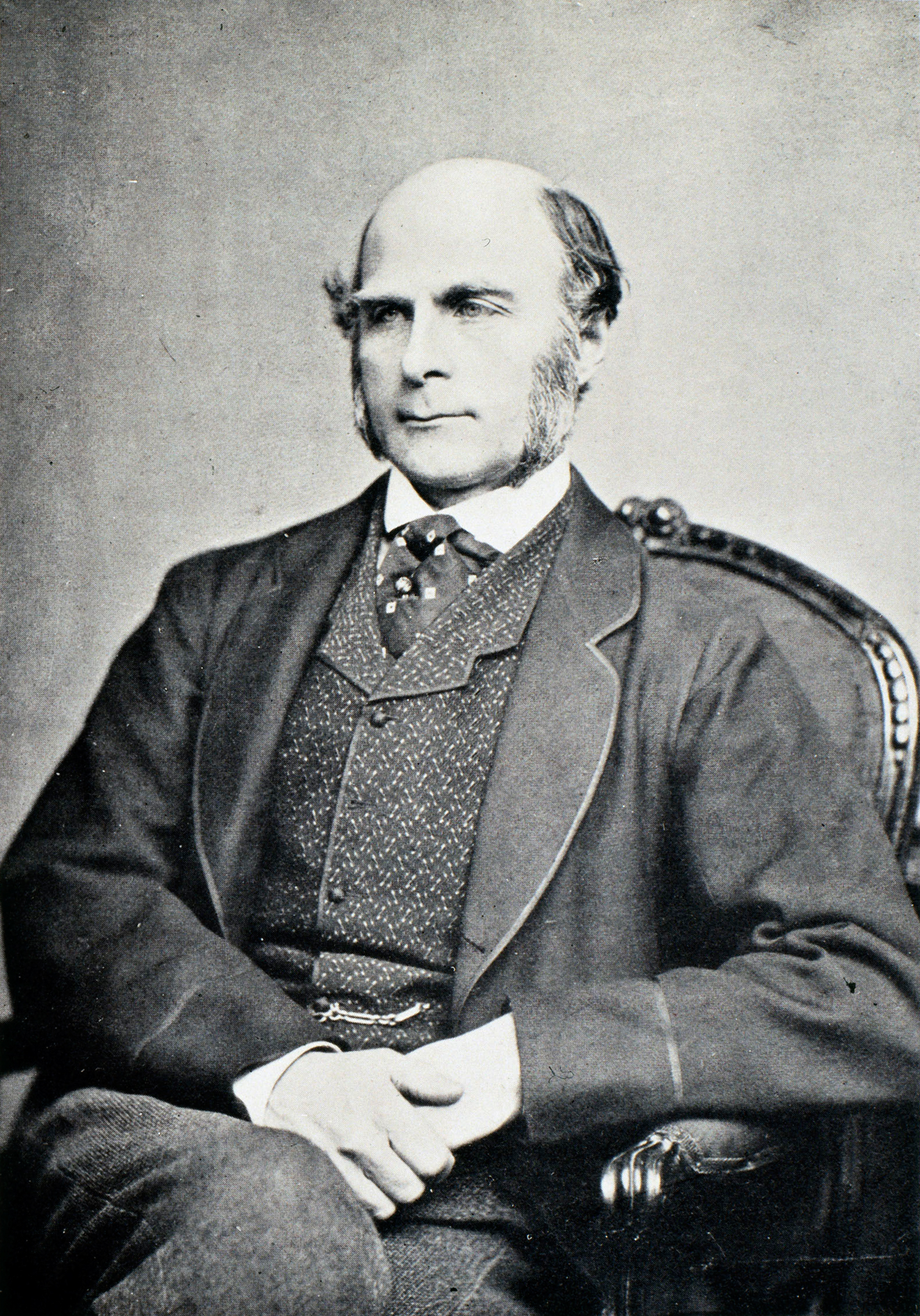
Francis Galton

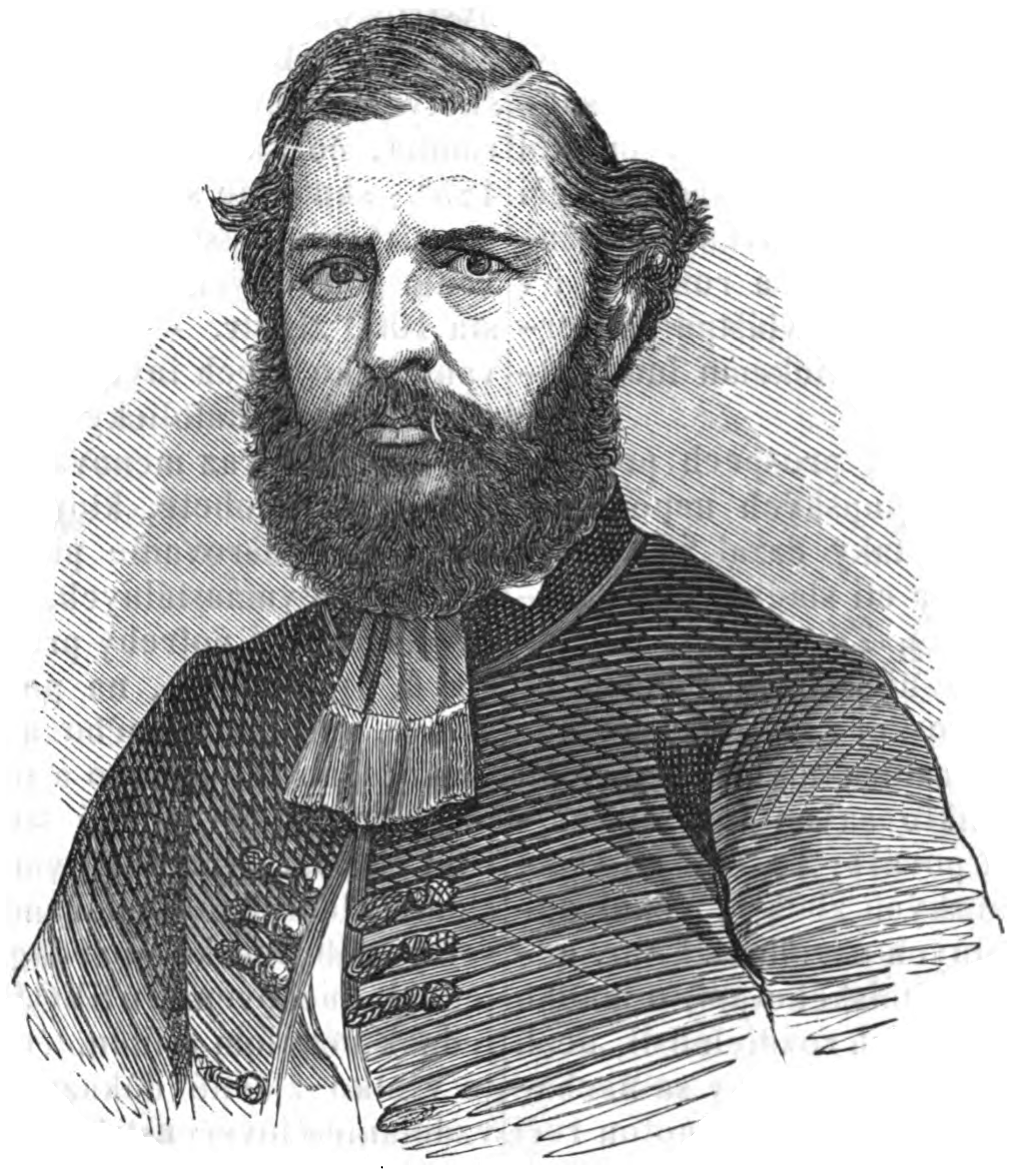
Ján Francisci-Rimavský

- January 2 – Rudolf Clausius, German physicist (d. 1888)
- January 6
  - Menyhért Lónyay, 5th Prime Minister of Hungary (d. 1884)
  - Heinrich Schliemann, German archaeologist (d. 1890)
- January 9 – Carol Benesch, Silesian and Romanian architect (d. 1896)
- January 12 – Étienne Lenoir, Belgian engineer (d. 1900)
- January 25 – Charles Reed Bishop, American businessman, philanthropist in Hawaii (d. 1915)
- January 28 – Alexander Mackenzie, 2nd Prime Minister of Canada (d. 1892)
- February 4 – Edward Fitzgerald Beale, American Navy Lieutenant, explorer (d. 1893)
- February 16 – Sir Francis Galton, English biologist (d. 1911)
- c. March – Harriet Tubman (born Araminta Ross), African-American abolitionist, humanitarian and spy (d. 1913)
- March 14 – Teresa Cristina of the Two Sicilies, Empress consort of Brazil (d. 1889)
- April 3 – Edward Everett Hale, American writer (d. 1909)
- April 26 – Frederick Law Olmsted, American landscape architect (d. 1903)
- April 27 – Ulysses S. Grant, 18th President of the United States (d. 1885)
- May 3 – István Bittó, 7th Prime Minister of Hungary (d. 1903)
- May 18 – Mathew Brady, American photographer (d. 1896)
- May 20 – Frédéric Passy, French economist, recipient of the Nobel Peace Prize (d. 1912)
- May 26 – Edmond de Goncourt, French writer (d. 1896)
- May 11 – Henry Baker Tristram, English clergyman, ornithologist. (d. 1906)
- June 10 – John Jacob Astor III, American businessman (d. 1890)

=== July–December ===
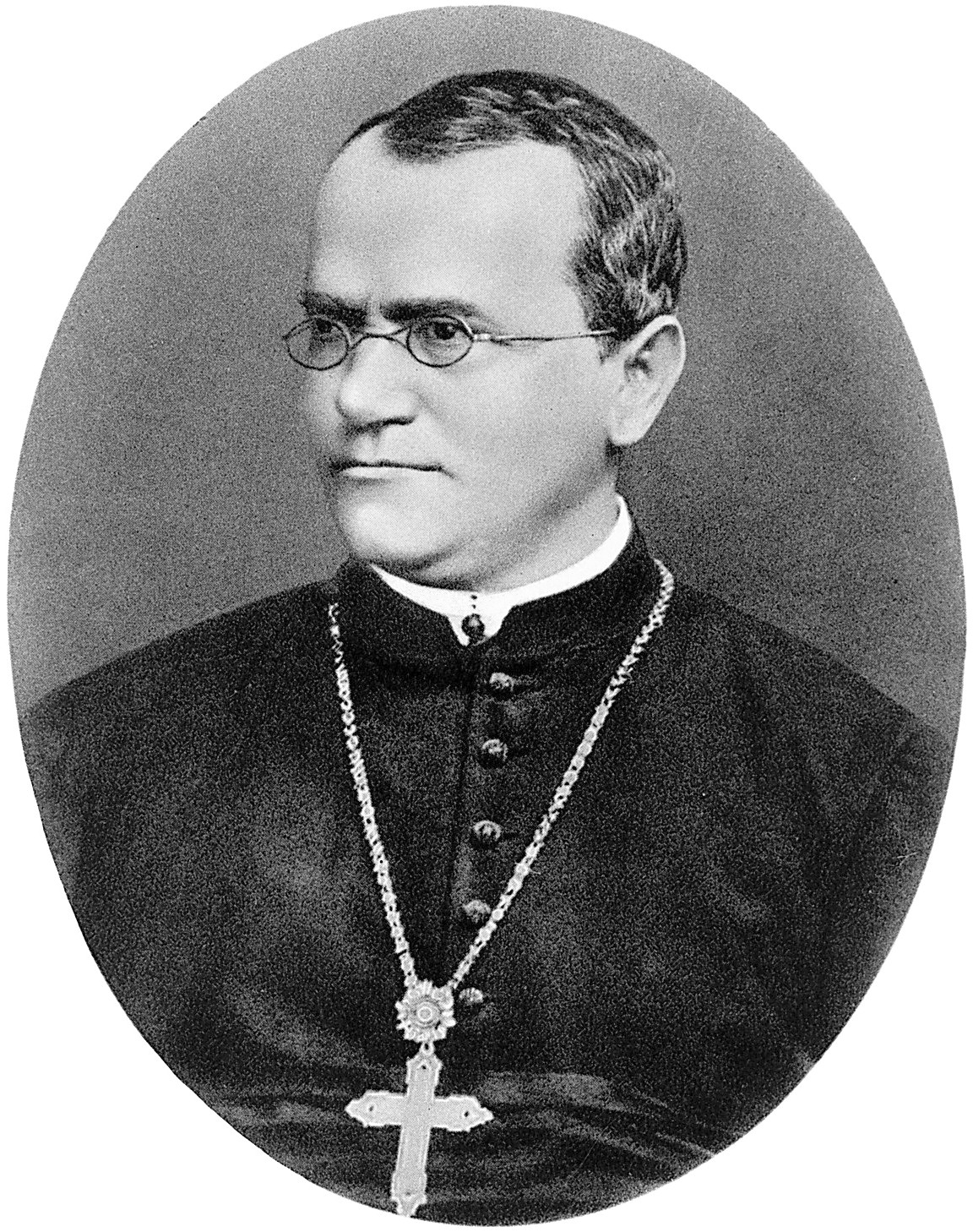
Gregor Mendel

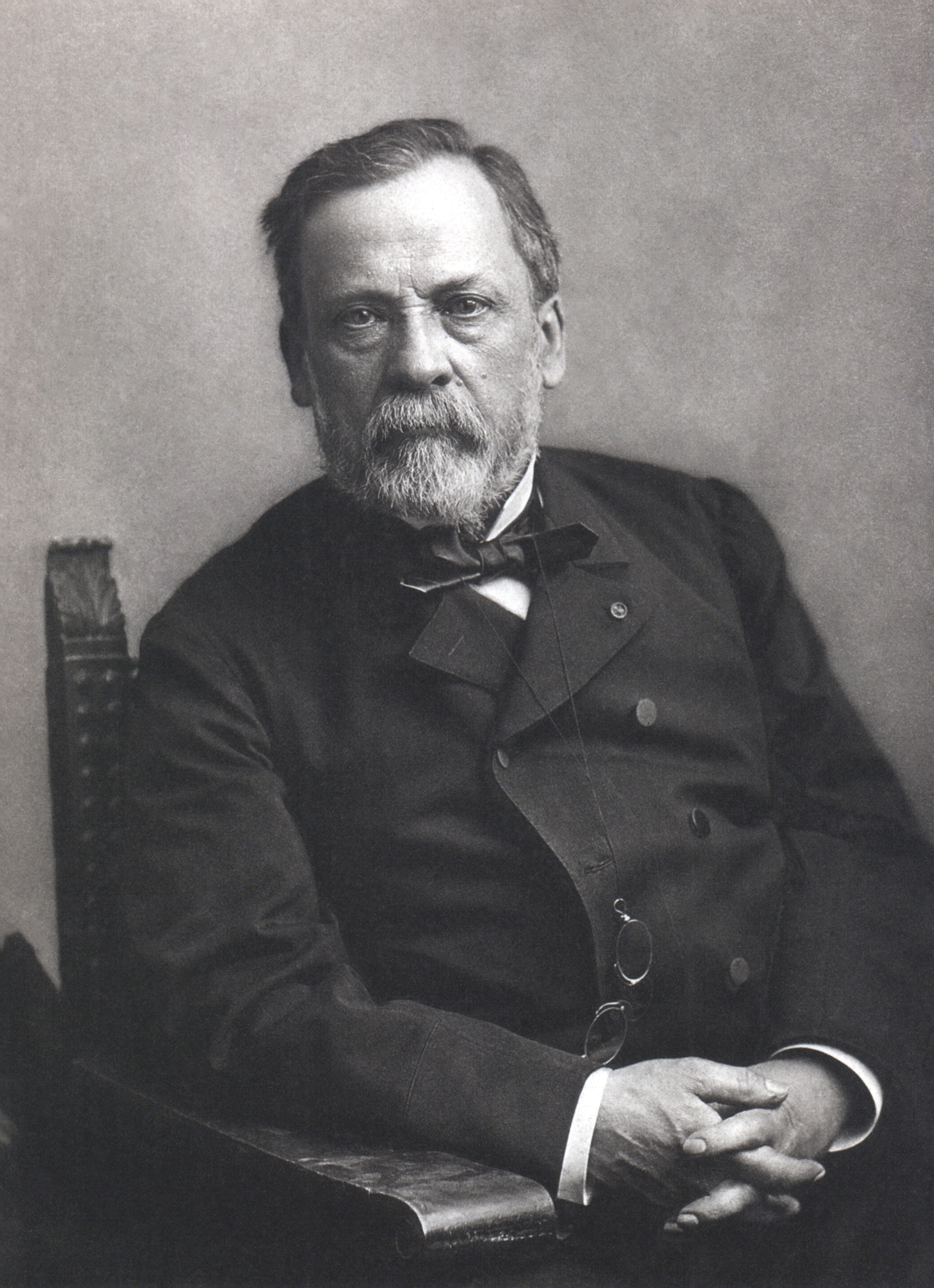
Louis Pasteur

- July 4 – Jean-Baptiste Claude Eugène Guillaume, French sculptor (d. 1905)
- July 19 – Princess Augusta of Cambridge (d. 1916)
- July 20 – Gregor Mendel, Czech geneticist (d. 1884)
- July 21 – Elizabeth Herbert, Baroness Herbert of Lea, English Catholic writer, translator, philanthropist, and influential social figure (d. 1911)
- July 25 – Andrew Bryson, American admiral (d. 1892)
- August 12 – August von Bulmerincq, Baltic German legal scholar (d. 1890)
- August 27 – William Hayden English, American politician (d. 1896)
- September 22 – Avraamy Aslanbegov, Russian admiral and historian (d. 1900)
- October 4 – Rutherford B. Hayes, 19th President of the United States (d. 1893)
- October 6 – Benjamin F. Isherwood, American admiral, United States Navy Engineer-in-Chief (d. 1915)
- December 10 – César Franck, Belgian composer, organist (d. 1890)
- December 24 – Matthew Arnold, English poet (d. 1888)
- December 27 – Louis Pasteur, French microbiologist, chemist (d. 1895)

== Deaths ==
=== January–June ===
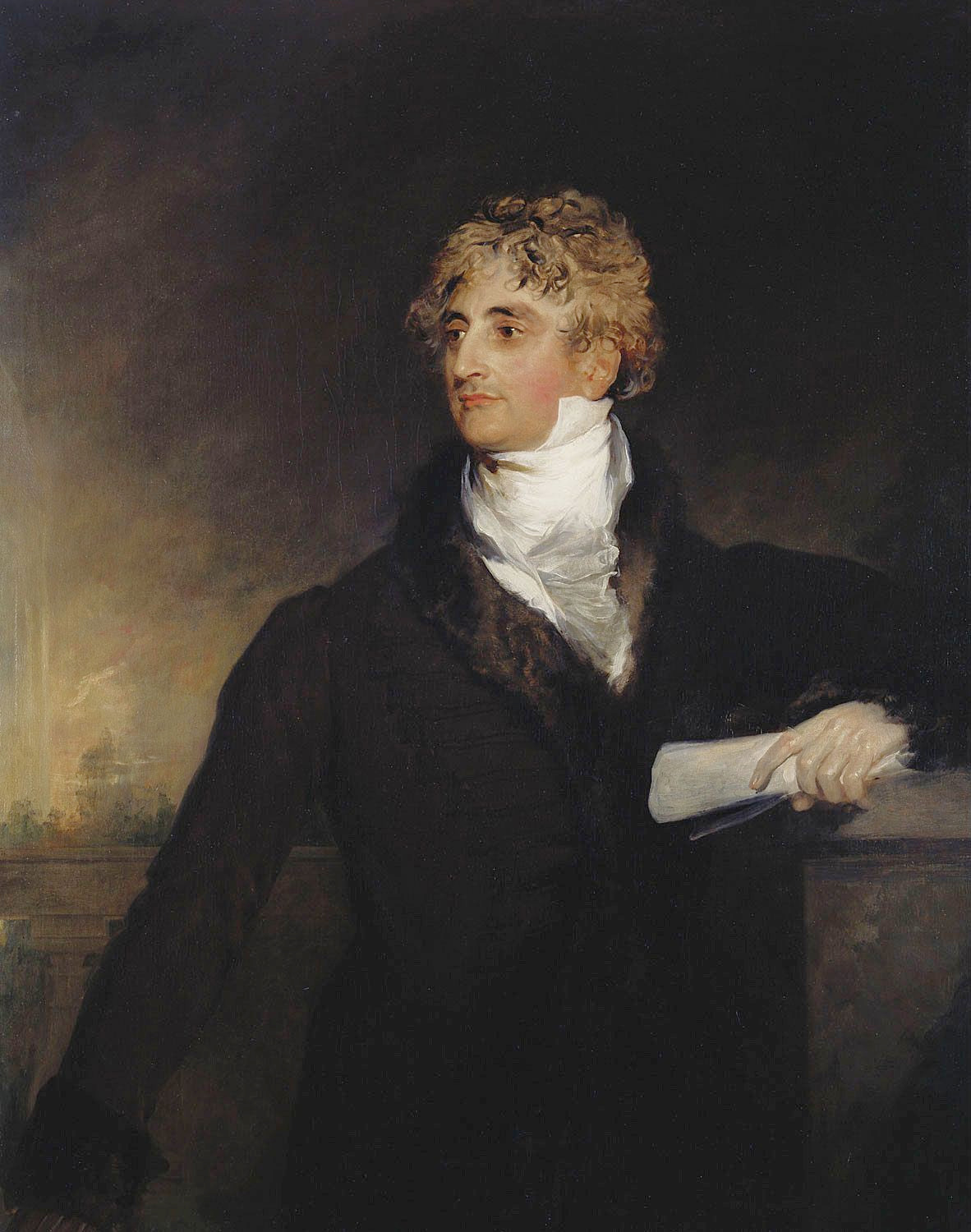
Duke of Richelieu.

- January 10 – Bathilde d'Orléans, French princess (b. 1750)
- January 16 – Elisabeth Berenberg, German banker (b. 1749)
- January 21 – Marie Aimée Lullin, Swiss entomologist (b. 1751)
- January 24 – Ali Pasha of Yanina, ruler of European Turkey (b. 1741)
- February 10 – Prince Albert of Saxony, Duke of Teschen (b. 1738)
- February 20 – John "Walking" Stewart, English traveller, philosopher (b. 1747)
- February 24 – Thomas Coutts, British banker (b. 1735)
- February 27 – John Borlase Warren, British admiral (b. 1753)
- March 1 – Jack Jouett, American politician (b. 1754)
- March 16 – Jeanne-Louise-Henriette Campan, French educator, lady in waiting (b. 1752)
- March 19 – Valentin Haüy, French educator, founder of the first school for the blind (b. 1745)
- April 14 – Edmund Butcher, English Unitarian minister (b. 1757)
- April 20 – Allegra Byron, illegitimate daughter of Lord Byron (b. 1817)
- May 8 – John Stark, American Revolutionary War general (b. 1728)
- May 17 – Armand-Emmanuel de Vignerot du Plessis, Duc de Richelieu, Prime Minister of France (b. 1766)
- May 27 – Augustus, Duke of Saxe-Gotha-Altenburg (b. 1772)
- June 3
  - Thomas Bulkeley, 7th Viscount Bulkeley, English aristocrat and politician (b. 1752)
  - René Just Haüy, French "father of modern crystallography" (b. 1743)
- June 15 – Horatio Walpole, 2nd Earl of Orford (b. 1752)
- June 25 – E. T. A. Hoffmann, German Romantic author (b. 1776)

=== July–December ===
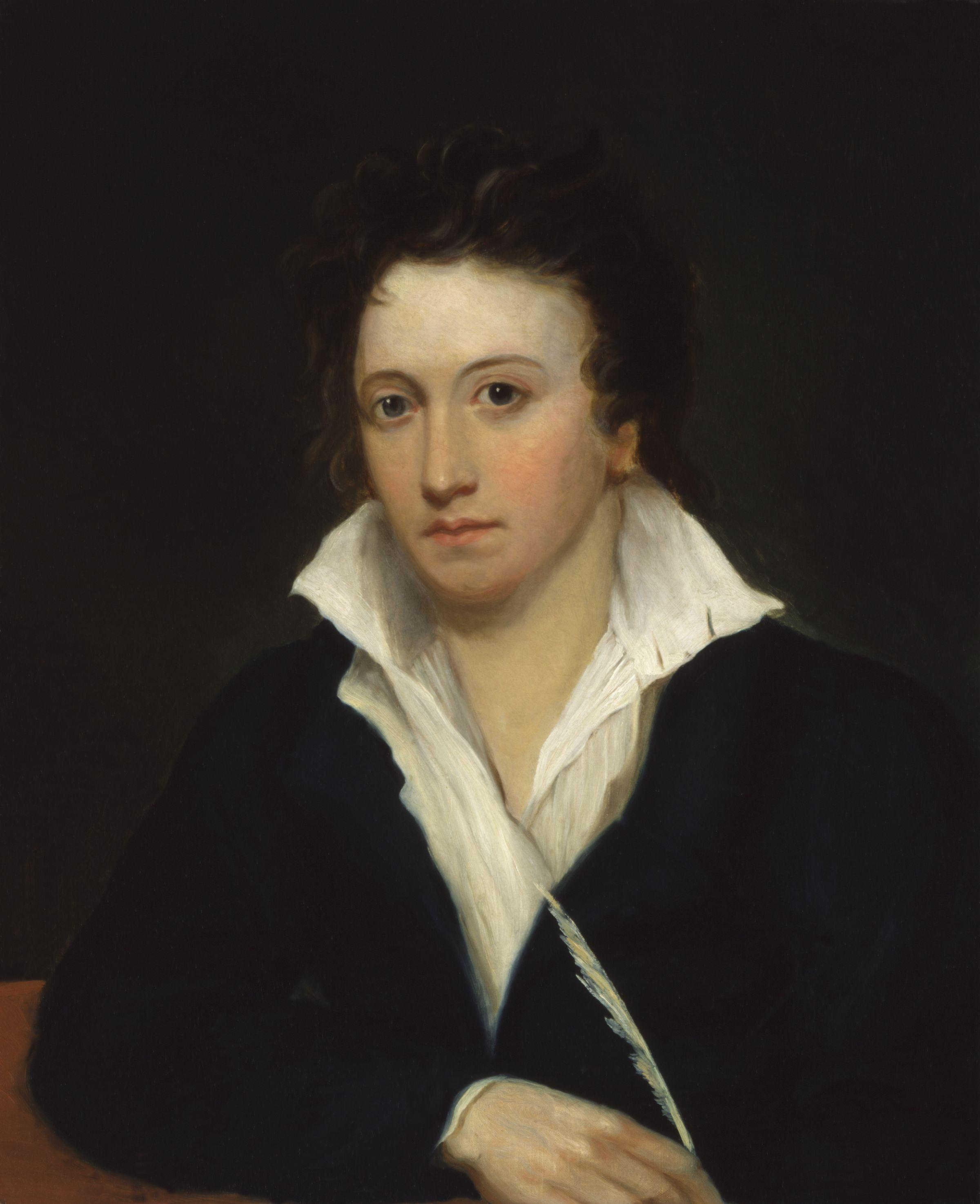
Percy Bysshe Shelley

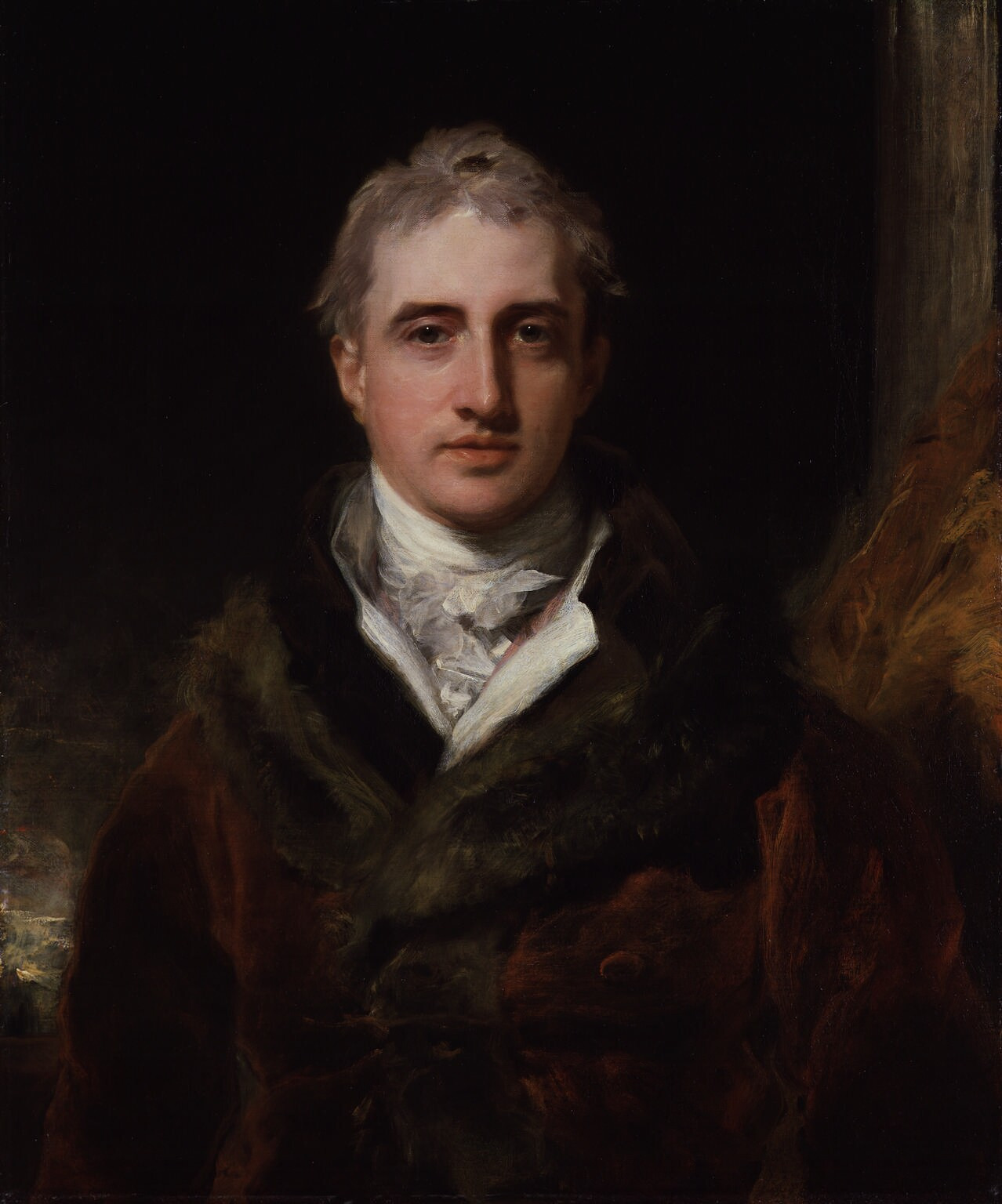
Robert Stewart, Viscount Castlereagh

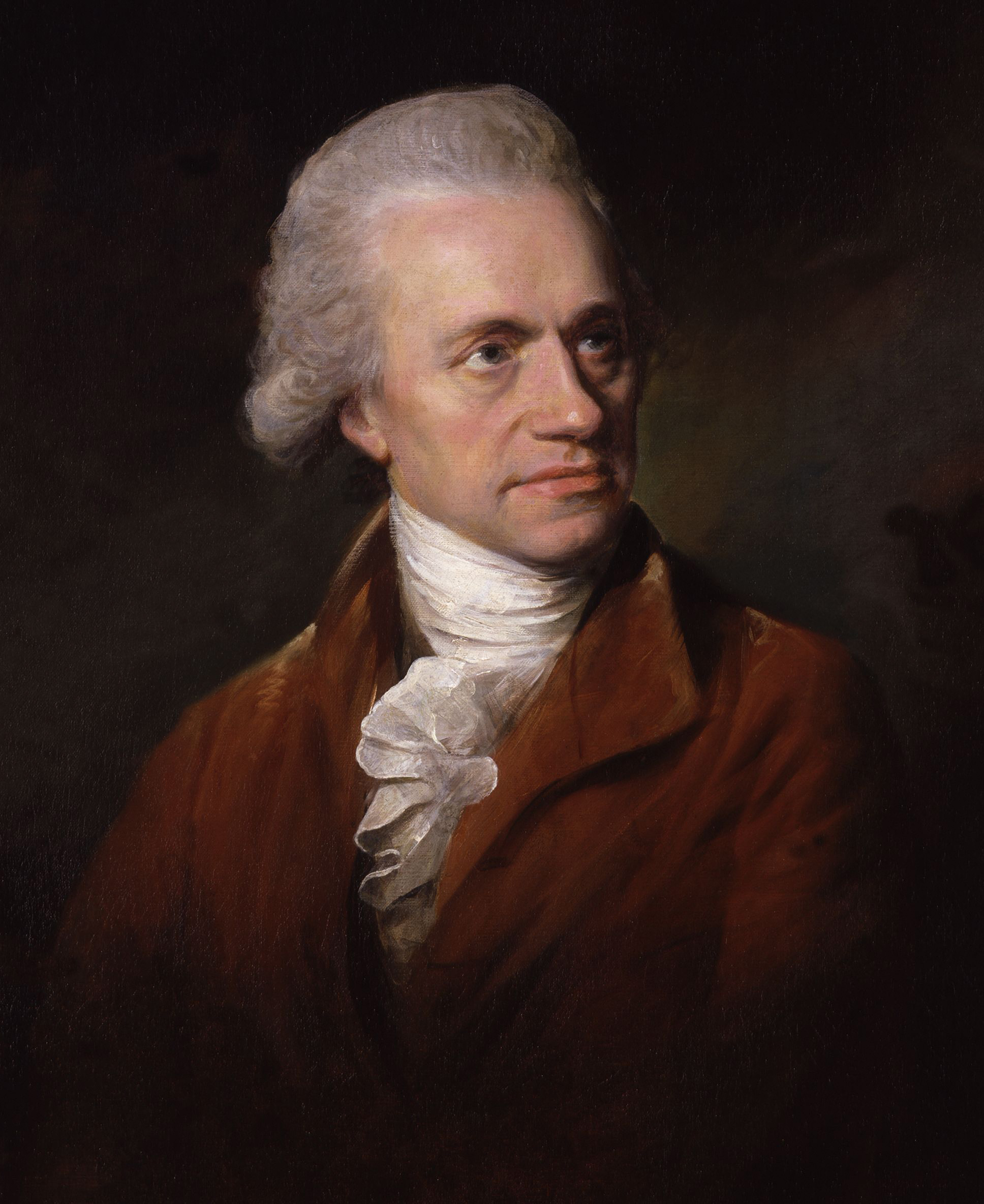
William Herschel

- July 8 – Percy Bysshe Shelley, British poet (b. 1792)
- July 15 – Manuel Torres, first Colombian ambassador to the United States (b. 1762)
- August 4 – Kristjan Jaak Peterson, Estonian poet (b. 1801)
- August 12 – Robert Stewart, Viscount Castlereagh, British foreign secretary (suicide) (b. 1769)
- August 25 – William Herschel, German-born British astronomer (b. 1738)
- September 2 – Félix Darfour, Haitian journalist (executed)
- September 8 – Sophie de Condorcet, politically active French salonist, feminist (b. 1764)
- October 13 – Antonio Canova, Italian sculptor (b. 1757)
- October 16 – Eva Marie Veigel, Austrian-born English ballet dancer, known as La Violette (b. 1724)
- October 25 – Sara Oust, Norwegian lay minister (b. 1778)
- October 26 – Mahmud Dramali Pasha, Ottoman vizier (b. c. 1780)
- October 31 – Jared Ingersoll, U.S. presidential candidate (b. 1749)
- November 6 – Claude Louis Berthollet, French chemist (b. 1748)
- November 24 – Zofia Potocka, Greek-Polish noble and agent (b. 1760)
- November 26 – Karl August von Hardenberg, Prussian politician (b. 1750)
- December 7 – John Aikin, English doctor and writer (b. 1747)
- December 17 – Giovanni Fabbroni, Italian scientist (b. 1752)

=== Date unknown ===
- Manuela Medina, Mexican national heroine (died of wounds) (b. 1780)
