= Leonidas Palaskas =

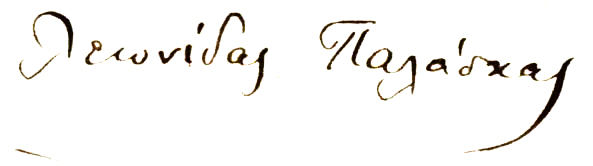
Signature of Palaskas from a letter to Kolettis, 1838

Leonidas Palaskas (Greek: Λεωνίδας Παλάσκας, 1819 – 14 January 1880) was a Greek naval officer who served in the French and in the Greek navies, as well as publishing a number of scientific studies.

== Life ==
Leonidas Palaskas was born in Ioannina in 1819, the son of the chieftain Christos Palaskas. His father was killed in 1822 during the Greek War of Independence, and Palaskas came under the protection of Ioannis Kolettis, who with the aid of the Philhellenic Committee of Paris sent him to France for studies. In 1833, through the intervention of Kolettis—now ambassador of the independent Kingdom of Greece to France—and King Louis-Philippe, Palaskas was enrolled in the newly established French Naval Academy at Brest. After graduating from the academy, he was commissioned as a naval officer in the French Navy. He distinguished himself for his education and scientific pursuits, participating in a circumnavigation of the Earth by a French warship. By 1844, he had reached the rank of Lieutenant, when he returned to Greece at the invitation of Kolettis, now Prime Minister.

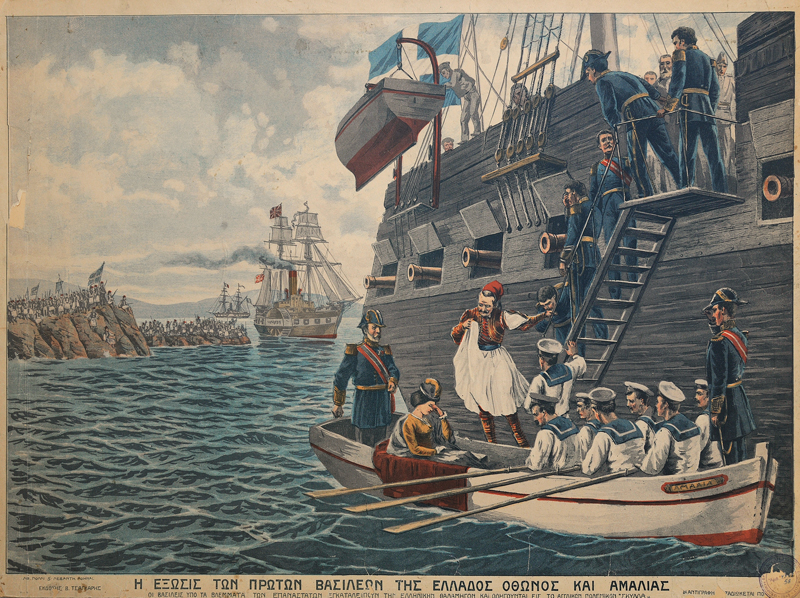
The expulsion of Otto and Amalia in 1862

On 24 October 1844, he was commissioned a Lieutenant in the Royal Hellenic Navy. Almost immediately Palaskas began advocating reforms and particularly the establishment of a dedicated school for naval officers, on the model of the French Navy. His ideas however encountered much resistance from the naval establishment and were never put into practice; although Palaskas was several times appointed Secretary-General in the Ministry for Naval Affairs, but unable to effect any reform, preferred to resign and devote himself to his duties as a ship commander. Nevertheless, on 24 November 1845, a training school began functioning on board the corvette Loudovikos, with Palaskas as executive officer and Captain Rafail as ship commander. The two officers however came into conflict, and although the Navy Ministry soon placed the direction of the "Naval School" (Ναυτικόν Παιδευτήριον) solely in Palaskas' hands, the latter asked for a placement elsewhere. As a result, the school ceased to function after 1854. It was not until 1862 that a similar school was re-established, functioning on-and-off until 1871; only in 1884 was the Hellenic Navy Academy permanently established.

In 1861 Palaskas was appointed captain of the new steam frigate Amalia, with the rank of Lieutenant Commander. After the abdication of King Otto in October 1862, he received both him and Queen Amalia on board the ship, conveying them to their exile. He joined the exiled royal couple in Bavaria until April 1866, when he returned to Greece.

Rapidly promoted to Commander and then Captain, he commanded the ironclads Vasilissa Olga and Vasilefs Georgios, as well as the Amalia (renamed Ellas), distinguishing himself for his stern but fair treatment of his crews. He served briefly as Minister for Naval Affairs in the short-lived cabinet of Epameinondas Deligeorgis in 1877, and in the subsequent government of the veteran admiral Konstantinos Kanaris, who also held the portfolio of Naval Affairs, he was appointed once more Secretary-General of the ministry. Palaskas died on 14 January 1880.

The Hellenic Navy's main recruit training centre at Skaramangas is named in his honour as the Palaskas Training Centre (Κέντρο Εκπαίδευσης Παλάσκα).

== Scientific studies ==
Palaskas displayed a keen interest in scientific and historical studies. He was the first to publish a study of the Tower of the Winds in 1856 that identified the structure not as a temple, but as a public clock. In 1866, he participated in a scientific mission to study the eruption of the Santorini volcano, while in 1875 he participated in the international geographical conference in Paris as Greece's representative. Much of his work remained unpublished, and was only discovered among his papers after his death. Among them were hydrographical studies, as well as a French–Greek dictionary of naval terms.
