= Christos Palaskas =

Greek chieftain and military leader (1788–1822)

Christos Palaskas (Greek: Χρήστος Παλάσκας; c. 1788–25 May 1822) was a Greek chieftain during the Greek War of Independence. He was killed by Odysseas Androutsos’s men, during an internal conflict.

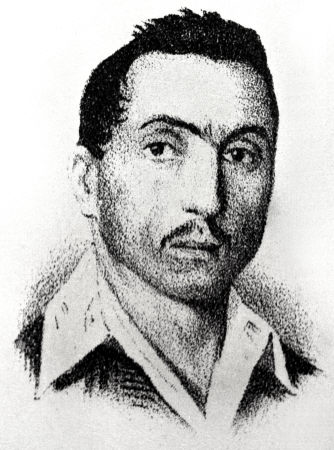
Lithograph depicting Palaskas (1866)

== Life ==
=== Origins and prerevolutionary career ===
Palaskas was born in about 1788, in Gotista, a village near Ioannina. When he was young he joined the Souliotes in their fight against Ali Pasha. Later, he fled to the Ionian Islands, where, amongst other Greeks, he served in the French, Russian and British armies as an officer of artillery during 1808–1817. He returned to Epirus after the disbandment of the Greek Light Infantry Regiment in 1818 (where he attained the rank of captain), and he served as an ordnance officer in the court of Ali Pasha of Ioannina, undertaking the organization of the artillery and training of his army, helping especially in regards to strategy and tactics.

=== In the service of Omer Vryoni ===
After the outbreak of the war between Ali Pasha and the Sublime Porte, Palaskas defected to the Sultan's troops and served as an ordnance officer to Omer Vryoni. When the Greek Revolution broke out, Palaskas initially remained on the Ottomans’ side and followed Omer Vryoni in his campaign against southern Greece. According to Greek historian Dionysios Kokkinos, Palaskas acted this way either because of his initial depreciation of the extent and the importance of the revolution or because of his fear for the safety of his family that remained in Epirus. After the Battle of Gravia Inn, he was sent by the Albanian general to negotiate with the rebels led by Odysseas Androutsos that had fled to Chlomo. During June, Palaskas managed to avert the debacle of Greek rebels in the battle of Sourpi by using a trick. More specifically, he persuaded Vrioni and Köse Mehmet not to launch a surprise attack against the rebels, claiming that such tactics were beneath the Ottoman armies when facing an inferior enemy.

Meanwhile, a few days later he prevented the surrender of the fortress of Livadeia fearing it could lead to a possible massacre by the Ottomans. After the final capture of the city by the Ottomans, Palaskas, according to writers such as Spiliadis and Koutsonikas, was appointed co-governor of the city.

=== Joining the Greek Revolution ===
In late July 1821, Palaskas held consultations with an envoy of Androutsos in order to help Greeks recapture the city. In fact, during the attack he served as a guide to Greek troops and contributed to the surrender of the location “Ora” by the defenders. After the events of Livadeia, Palaskas and forty of his men, on August 2, joined officially the Greek rebels and went to Galaxidi. There, he talked to Alexandros Mavrokordatos and Alexandros Kantakouzinos saying that first of all he intended to move towards Epirus to release his captive family. That explains the fact that a few days earlier he had turned down Androutsos's generous offer of joining him in Eastern Roumeli. In the end, however, they convinced him to remain in the rebellious territories.

The final decision of Palaskas of joining the Greek revolution was considered to be a significant loss for Omer Vrioni and Köse Mehmet, as Palaskas was a person with great influence on various chieftains and notables of Central Greece and therefore could be used by the Ottomans as a mediator in possible negotiations that could lead to the subjugation of the rebellious regions.

Later, Palaskas's family was released and then reunited. In March 1822, after he received the title of chiliarch, he moved from Vrachori to Corinth, where the Greek revolutionary government resided.

=== Involvement in the civil conflicts and his murder ===
In April 1822 Palaskas was sent by order of the government to Eastern Continental Greece to accompany Alexis Noutsos. Noutsos's mission was to persuade Demetrios Ypsilantis to return to the Peloponnese and, at the same time, to prepare the ground for the dismissal of Odysseas Androutsos from the leadership of Eastern Continental Greece, because the popular chieftain at that time was in direct conflict with the local ruling council, the Areopagus. Moreover, during the mission, Palaskas met with Androutsos at his camp in the area of Drakospilia on Mount Parnassus.

During May the two men were sent again to Continental Greece with a small force of thirty armed men. or fifty Palaskas was sent as a replacement of Androutsos, because the latter, being in conflict with the Areopagus, had declared his resignation although he wasn't willing to hand over the command of his army. Noutsos was sent as a political governor of Eastern Continental Greece, and was also entrusted with military responsibilities. At the same time, they were carrying a government decree calling Androutsos to go to Corinth to explain himself. According to Oikomonou and Spiliadis, the orders allowed capturing or even killing Androutsos if he refused to obey. On the other hand, however, Spyridon Trikoupis believes these orders to be a false rumor, that when Androutsos heard was infuriated.

On May 14 they went to Distomo first, where they were officially welcomed. There, after they overthrown the local guard of Androutsos's men and installed their own, they moved towards Stylida where they talked to Ypsilantis. From Stylida, initially they seemed to move towards Patratziki, where was a strong force under Nikitaras, after the instigation of Ypsilantis, who, according to one version suggested this route to protect them from Androutsos. In the end, on Noutsos's initiative, they moved towards Androutsos's camp in the area of Drakospilia.

According to one version, when they were in Dadi village, they were approached by Androutsos's men. The latter, knowing the purpose of their mission, initially went at the headquarters of Ypsilantis with a force of sixty soldiers to find out information about the moves of the two men. There, they called Androutsos to a meeting, but he did not attend, because his men were afraid of a possible conflict with the opposite side's armed escort. After that, according to the same version, although they told him via messenger that they would go to Messolonghi, the next day they continued towards Drakospilia.

On May 25, as they were entering the camp in the area of Drakospilia they were surrounded by Androutsos's troops. After a short siege at the nearby church of St. George they were surrendered and transferred within the camp. There, after Androutsos took the documents that they were carrying and read them to his men, at his instigation, they killed them both. Some authors report that, before they arrived and captured, Palaskas suspected Androutsos's threatening intentions but Noutsos didn't pay attention to his fears.

Palaskas was acknowledged as a fine soldier but he wasn't consider to be a suitable replacement of Androutsos, since during the first months of the revolution he was at the Ottoman's side, but also because it would mean that he would replace a chieftain who treated him very friendly until then.

According to some writers, the deaths of Palaskas and Noutsos were the result of Ioannis Kolettis’s actions, who wanted them dead for his own purposes. In the case of Palaskas, it’s argued that the reason was Kolettis’s desire to make Palaskas’s wife his mistress, which actually happened after her husband’s death.

== Family ==
Christos Palaskas was the son of armatolos Leontaris Palaskas and nephew of chieftain Dimitrios or Theodoros Palaskas. The latter was Georgios Botsaris’s son in law and managed to influence in a negative way Georgios and Kitsos Botsaris, as he was working under Ali Pasha, who in the end executed him.

Palaskas had two children, a son and a daughter. His son, Leonidas Palaskas, was a naval officer, writer and politician. His daughter, Anthousa Roujoux, a well-known figure of Athens in the 19th century, was the wife of a French diplomat, Count de Roujoux. His grandson was the French diplomat Jules de Roujoux . His nephew was Georgios Palaskas, also a fighter of the Greek Revolution.

== Bibliography ==
- Sp. P. Aravantinos [Σπ. Π. Αραβαντινός], Ιστορία Αλή πασά του Τεπελενλή - Συγγραφείσα επί τη βάσει ανεκδότου έργου του Παναγιώτου Αραβαντινού, Εκ του Τυπογραφείου των Καταστημάτων Σπυρίδωνος Κουσουλίνου, Εν Αθήναις, 1895.
- Yannis G. Benekos [Γιάννης Γ. Μπενέκος], Κωλέτης - Ο πατέρας των πολιτικών μας ηθών, Κυψέλη, Αθήνα, 1961.
- Michail Georgiou Ekonomou [Μιχαήλ Γεωργίου Οικονόμου], Ιστορικά της Ελληνικής Παλιγγενεσίας ή ο ιερός αγώνας των Ελλήνων, Εκ του τυπογραφείου Θ. Παπαλεξανδρή, Αθήναι, 1873.
- Anastasios N. Goudas [Αναστάσιος Ν. Γούδας], Βίοι Παράλληλοι των επί της αναγεννήσεως της Ελλάδος διαπρεψάντων ανδρών, Εκ του Τυπογραφείου Μ. Π. Περίδου, Εν Αθήναις, 1870.
- Dionysios Kokkinos [Διονύσιος Κόκκινος], Η Ελληνική Επανάστασις, εκδόσεις Μέλισσα, έκτη έκδοσις, vol.2 (Β΄), Αθήναι, 1974.
- Lambros Koutsonikas [Λάμπρος Κουτσονίκας], Γενική ιστορία της Ελληνικής Επαναστάσεως, Τύποις του "Ευαγγελισμού" Δ. Καρακατζάνη, Εν Αθήναις, 1864.
- Karpos Papadopoulos [Κάρπος Παπαδόπουλος], Ανασκευή των εις την ιστορίαν των Αθηνών αναφερομένων περί του στρατηγού Οδυσσέως Ανδρούτζου του ελληνικού τακτικού και του συνταγματάρχου Καρόλου Φαββιέρου, Εκ της Τυπογραφίας Πέτρου Μαντζαράκη, Εν Αθήναις, 1837.
- Ioannis Philimon [Ιωάννης Φιλήμων], Δοκίμιον ιστορικόν περί της Eλληνικής Eπαναστάσεως, Τύποις Π. Σούτσα και Α. Κτενά, vol.2 (Β'), Αθήναι, 1860.
- Nikolaos Spiliadis [Νικόλαος Σπηλιάδης], Απομνημονεύματα, Εκ του Τυπογραφείου Χ. Ν. Φιλαδελφέως, vol.1 (Α΄), Αθήνησιν, 1851.
- Spyridon Trikoupis [Σπυρίδων Τρικούπης], Ιστορία της Ελληνικής Επαναστάσεως, Εκ της εν τη Αυλή του Ερυθρού Λέοντος Τυπογραφίας Ταϋλόρου και Φραγκίσκου, vol.2 (Β'), Εν Λονδίνω, 1861.
- Apostolos E. Vakalopoulos [Απόστολος Ε. Βακαλόπουλος], Ιστορία του Νέου Ελληνισμού, vol.6 (ΣΤ'), Θεσσαλονίκη, 1982.
- Yannis Vlachoyannis [Γιάννης Βλαχογιάννης], Απομνημονεύματα Στρατηγού Μακρυγιάννη, Βαγιονάκης, vol.1 (Α'), Αθήναι 1947.
- Stefanos Th. Xenos [Στέφανος Θ. Ξένος], Η ηρωίς της ελληνικής επαναστάσεως ήτοι σκηναί εν Ελλάδι από του έτους 1821-1828, Εν Λονδίνω, 1861.
