= Veronika Gut =

Veronika Gut (6 May 1757 – 28 April 1829) was a Swiss farmer’s wife and political figure from Stans, Nidwalden. She became a leader of conservative resistance to the Helvetic Republic between 1798 and 1803, providing financial and material support and exerting political influence by hosting meetings at her home. Until 1815 she remained a significant voice in Nidwalden politics.

== Biography ==
Veronika Gut was born in Stans, Switzerland, in 1757, the daughter of a farmer. She married twice, first to Leonz Joller in 1777 and later to Melk Odermatt, a member of the local council, and had seven children.

Rooted in Catholic tradition and opposed to Enlightenment ideas, she became a leading conservative figure during the Helvetic Republic, supporting resistance to the new order between 1798 and 1803. She contributed 600 gulden to the Nidwalden war effort and sent her eldest son into battle, where he was killed.

Following Nidwalden’s defeat in 1798, Gut was arrested and in 1799 sentenced in Schwyz as a “troublemaking liar” (ruhestörende Lügnerin). Despite this punishment she continued to supply weapons and financial support to the rebels. In September 1801, after being told French troops were approaching, she fled with her children, during which four of her daughters drowned in the Engelberger Aa river. In early 1803 she was again arrested for disruptive behaviour.

She also continued to host meetings at her home, exerting influence in ways otherwise closed to women at the time. Until 1815 she remained influential and was a significant political voice in Nidwalden. With the canton’s occupation by Swiss federal troops in August 1815, her political influence came to an end.

Veronika Gut died in Stans in 1829.

== See also ==
- Peasant revolts
- Swiss folklore
