= Edmund Butcher =

English Unitarian minister

- Born: 1757
- Died: 1822 (aged 64–65)

Edmund Butcher (28 April 1757 – 14 April 1822) was an English Unitarian minister.

== Early life ==
Butcher was born on 28 April 1757, at Colchester. The only son of an unsuccessful builder, he had early to struggle for a living. His primary education was given him by Dr. Thomas Stanton, Presbyterian minister at Colchester.

At fourteen years of age, he gave sign of precocious talent in an heroic poem, the "Brutæis", illustrated with pen-and-ink drawings (not printed). He was soon apprenticed to a London linen-draper, and at this early age wrote for periodicals, sending the profits to his parents and sister.

Subsequently, the family inherited the small estate of their ancestor, John Butcher, vicar of Feering, Essex, about 1657. Butcher attended the ministry of Hugh Worthington, the eloquent Arian of Salters' Hall, who prepared him for the ministry.

== Ministry ==
He entered Daventry Academy, under Thomas Belsham, in 1783, having previously received some classical training from Richard Wright, Presbyterian minister at Atherstone. He had been taught the assembly's catechism, but he says he never gave credence to the trinitarian doctrine, and his studies confirmed him in Arian views.

His first settlement was at Sowerby, near Halifax, but he soon moved to London, where Worthington got him temporary engagements at Monkwell Street and Carter Lane. He was ordained 19 March 1789, as successor to Thomas Pope at Leather Lane, Holborn. In this ordination Belsham, who was still reputed orthodox, was associated, for the first time, with Theophilus Lindsey, the only humanitarian minister in London, and five Arian ministers.

While at Leather Lane Butcher took part with others in the Wednesday evening lecture established by Worthington (after 1792) at Salters' Hall. His feebleness of voice precluded him from popularity, and compelled his retirement from active duty in 1797.

Butcher's lungs recovered tone, and in 1798 he became minister at Sidmouth in Devon. Here he remained till 1820, building a house on a piece of ground presented to him by a member of a wealthy Jewish family, who attended his services. Relinquishing all belief in a propitiatory atonement, his views gradually passed from the Arian to the humanitarian form of unitarianism.

A paralysing stroke weakened the later years of his ministry, but did not prevent him from preaching. Early in 1821 he went to reside with his son at Bristol, and moved from there in November to Bath. A fall, which dislocated hie hip, confined him to bed. He died on Sunday (his own wish), 14 April 1822, and was buried at Lyncomb Vale, near Bath.

== Works ==
He published, in his life:

1. Sermons, to which are subjoined suitable Hymns, 1798, octavo (the hymns are original, and intended as "poetical epitomes" of the twenty-one sermons; the second edition, 1806, octavo, has title Sermons for the use of Families, contains twenty-two sermons and no hymns).
2. Moral Tales, 1801, duodecimo.
3. The Substance of the Holy Scriptures methodised, 1801, quarto, 2nd ed. 1813, quarto (intended as a sort of family Bible; Butcher assisted Worthington and others in its preparation, and contributed a hymn to each lesson).
4. An Excursion from Sidmouth to Chester in the Summer of 1803, (2 vols), Volume 1 1806, duodecimo.
5. A Picture of Sidmouth; the fourth edition, Exeter [1830], duodecimo, has title A new Guide, descriptive of the Beauties of Sidmouth.
6. Sermons for the use of Families, volume ii. 1806, octavo.
7. Unitarian Claims described and vindicated, 1809, duodecimo (sermon on 2 Corinthians x. 7, at Bridgwater, Wednesday, 5 July, before the Western Unitarian Society, of biographical interest as giving the process by which he reached his latest views).
8. Sermons for the use of Families, volume iii. 1819, octavo (twenty-eight sermons printed at the Chiswick Press; the preface, 1 May, reproduces the autobiographical details of No. 7).
9. Prayers for the use of Families and Individuals, 1822, octavo (one for each sermon in his three volumes, and some for special occasions); and single sermons.

Posthumous were:

1. Discourses on our Lord's Sermon on the Mount, Bath and London, 1825, duodecimo (twenty-one sermons edited by his widow; the preface says he had selected the materials for another volume).
2. A Poetical Version of the Chronological History of the Kings of England, 1827, duodecimo.

Besides these, Butcher contributed to the Protestant Dissenters Magazine, 1794-9 (see especially volume i. pp 120, 204, 246, 330, 373, 417, 460, for poetical pieces), and edited the later volumes.

== Legacy ==
A tablet to his memory was placed in the Old Meeting House, Sidmouth. One who knew him describes him as "a most lovable man in all respects". Butcher is known among topographers by his account of Sidmouth, and among poets by a few hymns of great merit. His hymn From north and south, from east to west won the warm commendation of Anna Barbauld.

== Family ==
He married, 6 July 1790, Elizabeth, eldest daughter of John Lawrence, a Shropshire landowner, and widow of Samuel Lowe; she died at Bath 25 November 1831. They had a son, Edmund, and a daughter, Emma.

== Personal papers ==
Records of the Butcher family, their predecessors and descendants are held at Bristol Archives (Ref. 32955) (online catalogue).
