= Greek Army uniforms =

Greek Evzones in the 1880s. Their uniform, the most widely recognisable Greek military dress, is derived from the dress of the klephts and the fighters of the Greek War of Independence.

The modern Greek Army has a history of almost 200 years, during which it has undergone dramatic changes and been involved in some of the major conflicts on the European continent. The modern Greek military throughout its history was closely following international developments in equipment and uniforms. With the notable exception of the elite Evzones units, which based their uniforms on the indigenous traditional garments of the 18th century, the rest of the Army, as most militaries worldwide, was always quick to adopt the military fashion current among the armies of the influential Great Powers. This influence can be roughly divided in three periods: French-style uniforms, which dominated throughout the 19th century (with many Bavarian elements during the reign of King Otto, and some Austrian and Russian influences later on), the British styles introduced around World War I and used during World War II and until the late 1960s, and the "NATO" or US-style predominating from ca. 1968 onward. Various individual items or details can of course be traced to other influences, and there were also transitional uniforms combining previous designs.

== Early 19th century ==
=== Greek War of Independence ===
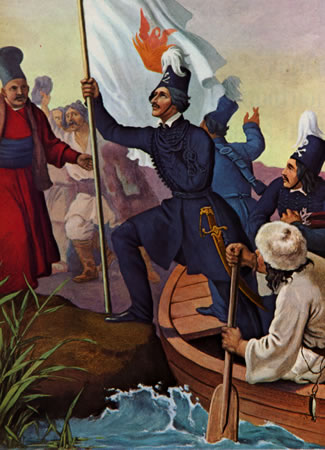
Alexander Ypsilantis crosses the Pruth, by Peter von Hess. Ypsilantis is depicted in the uniform of the Sacred Band.

The army that fought the Greek Revolution was composed primarily of irregulars, who followed their own military leaders or "captains", and had no uniform code of dress. The first uniformed Greek unit however was the short-lived Sacred Band formed by Alexander Ypsilantis in the Danubian Principalities. Its uniform was black, inspired by Russian models and the uniforms of Brunswick, including the death's head emblem on the men's visorless shakos.

In Greece itself, uniforms of West European cut and black colour arrived in 1822, and were meant to be used by the newly established "Regular Corps". The Greeks however largely preferred their native garb, and only in 1825, when French Colonel Charles Fabvier assumed command of the regular forces, did a uniform, imported from Britain, begin to be used. It consisted of a blue coat, grey trousers (identical to those of the British Army), white leather equipment and a black leather, classically looking helmet. In 1828, Governor Ioannis Kapodistrias supplied the reorganised army with French-style uniforms, and issued a standardised version of the traditional dress for the irregular forces. His reforms however faltered after his assassination, and by 1832, for all intents and purposes, the regular Greek Army was non-existent.

=== Reign of King Otto ===
When the Bavarian prince Otto arrived in Greece, he was accompanied by a Bavarian Expeditionary Corps. The Greek Army was reorganised, and new, Bavarian-style uniforms, were issued, which in turn were greatly influenced by French and Russian models. The basic Line Infantry uniform was light blue, with white breeches during summer, with bright red collar, piping and cuff facings. Staff officers, Artillery and Engineer Corps soldiers wore a dark blue uniform, with red and black as the branch of service color for the Artillery and the Engineers respectively. A shako was worn as headdress, featuring the blue-white national cockade and King Otto's royal cypher, a crowned "O". The cavalry alone adopted a uniform based on that of the Polish lancers, in green with cherry red as its branch of service color. The "Phalanx", a special corps formed of pensioned officers of the Revolution, and the Mountain Guard battalions, wore standardised versions of the traditional garb, the former quite elaborate and embellished with gold embroidery, the latter plainer. A new uniform style was adopted in 1851, effectively copying the new French uniform styles, and was retained until after the ousting of Otto in 1862.

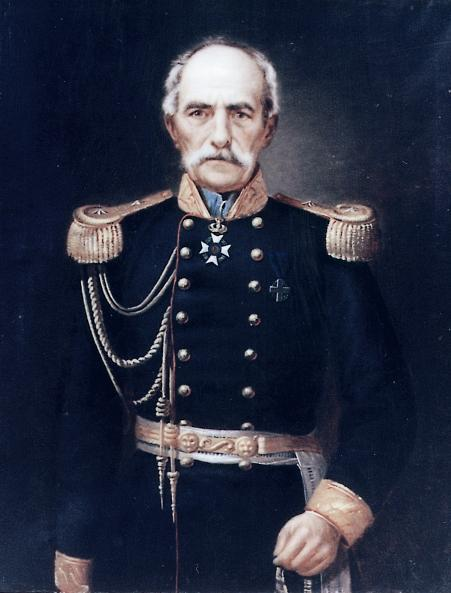
Nikolaos Petimezas in general's uniform (1851–62)

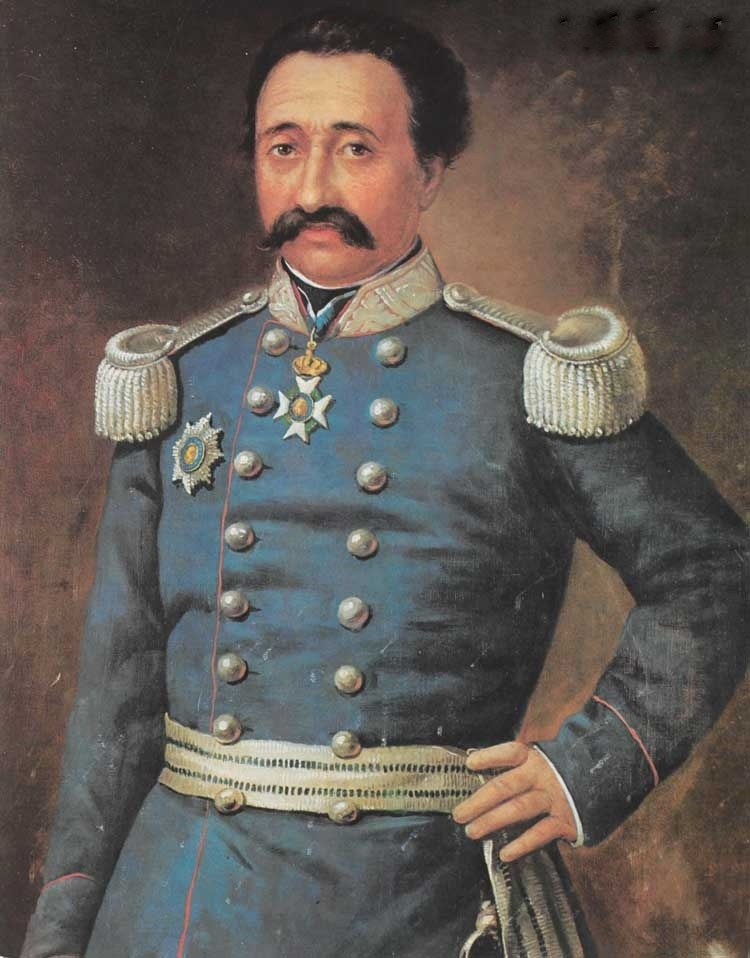
Andreas Londos in colonel's uniform

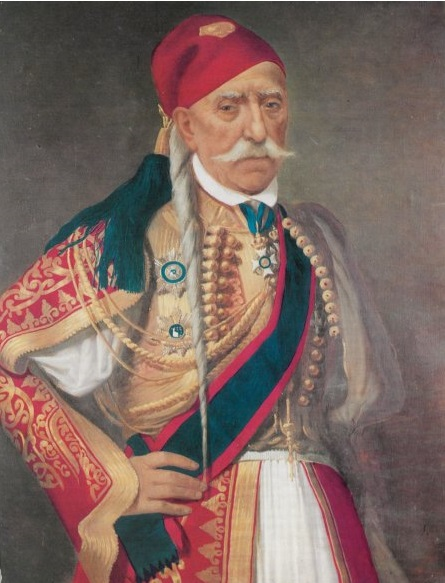
Dimitrios Plapoutas in the uniform of the Royal Phalanx

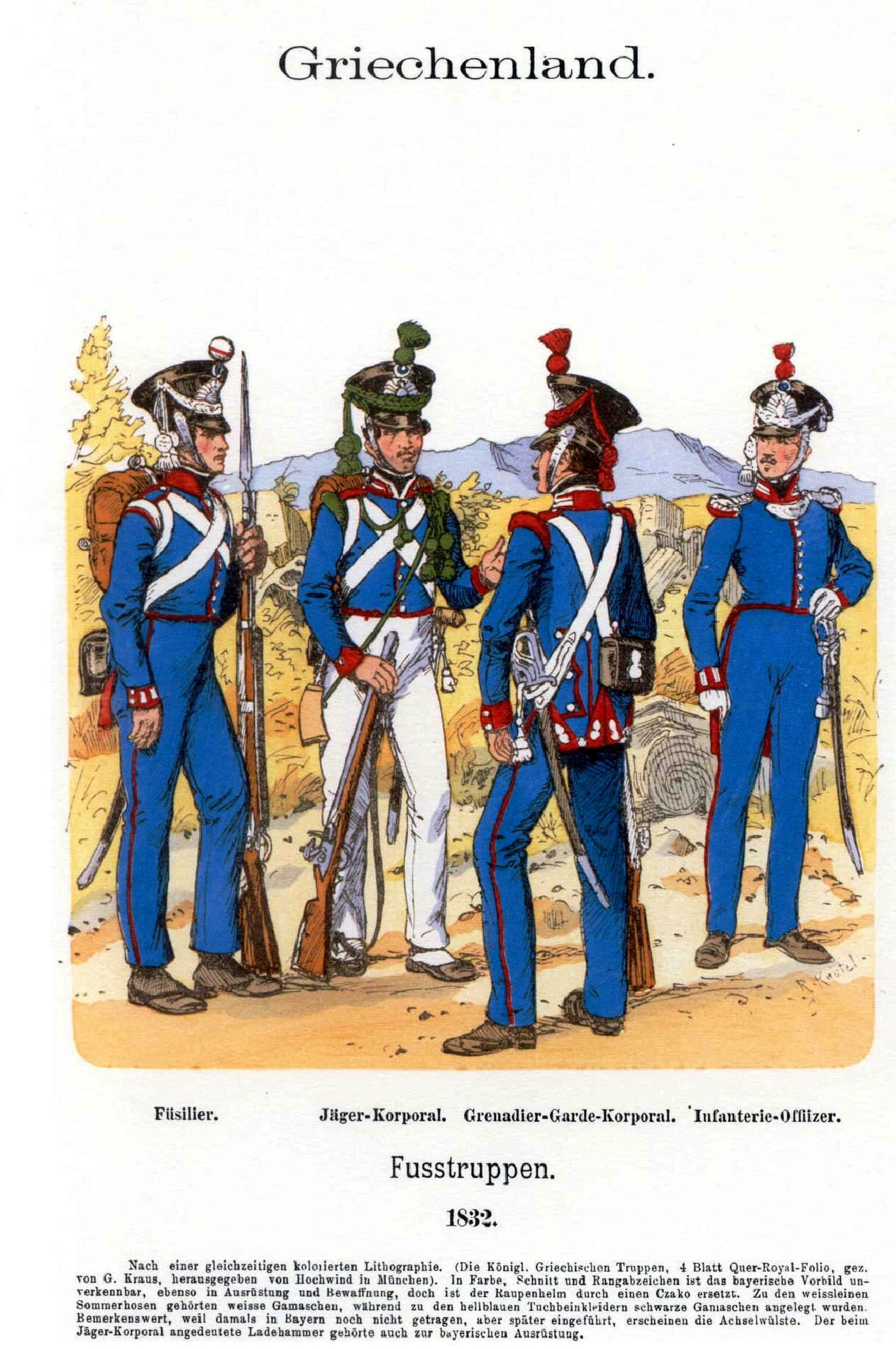
Uniforms of the Infantry in the first period of Otto's reign (1832–1851)

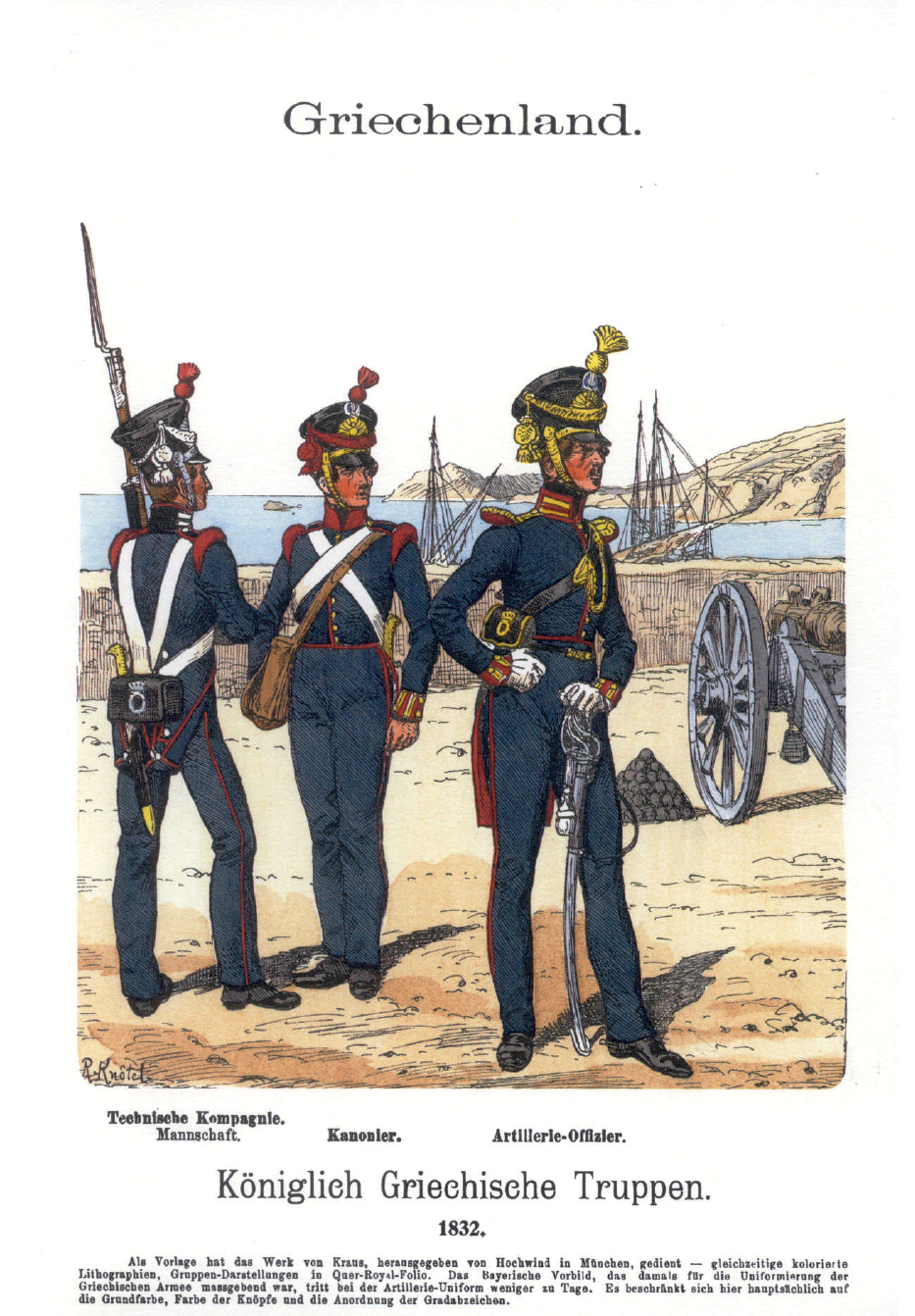
Uniforms of the Artillery in the first period of Otto's reign (1832–1851)

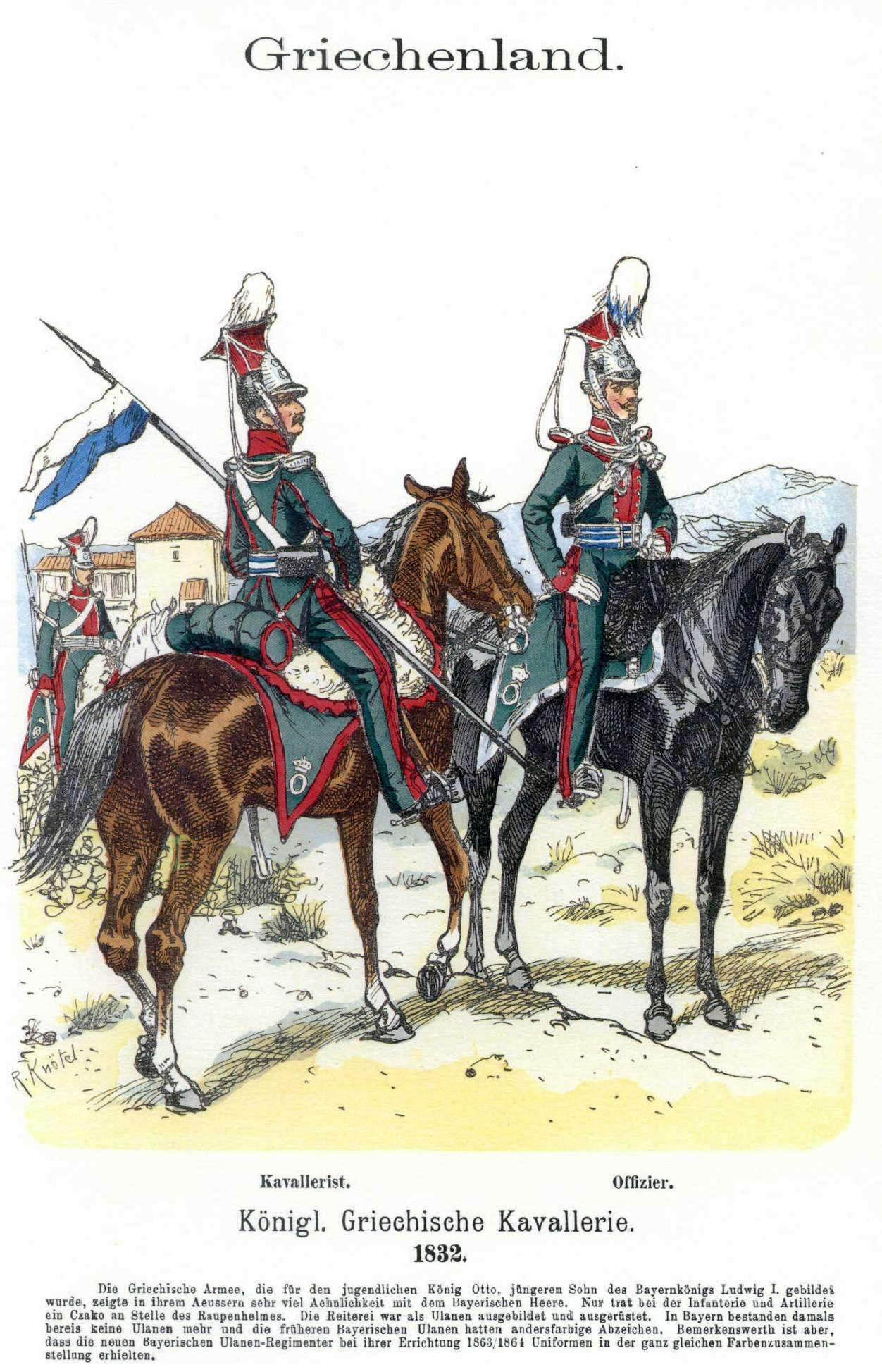
Uniforms of the Cavalry in the first period of Otto's reign (1832–1851)

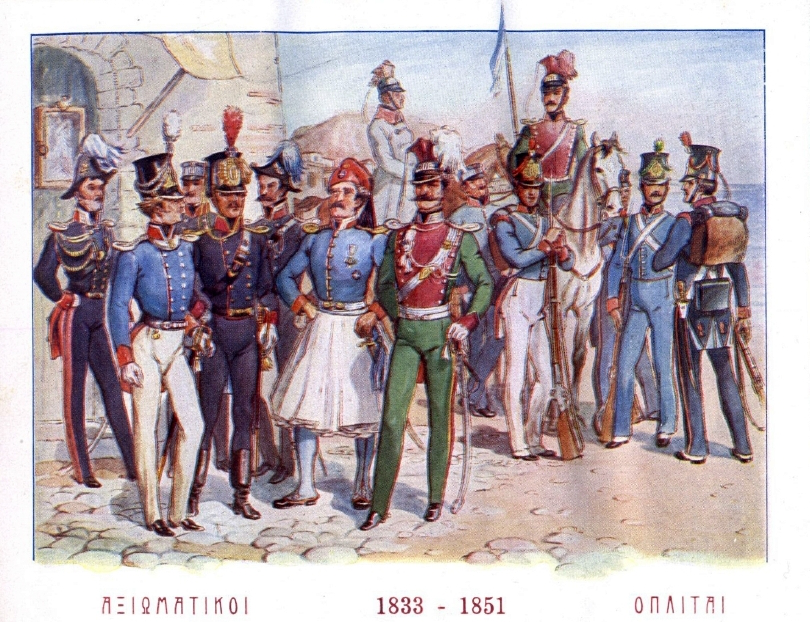
Assorted Army uniforms in the first period of Otto's reign (1832–1851)

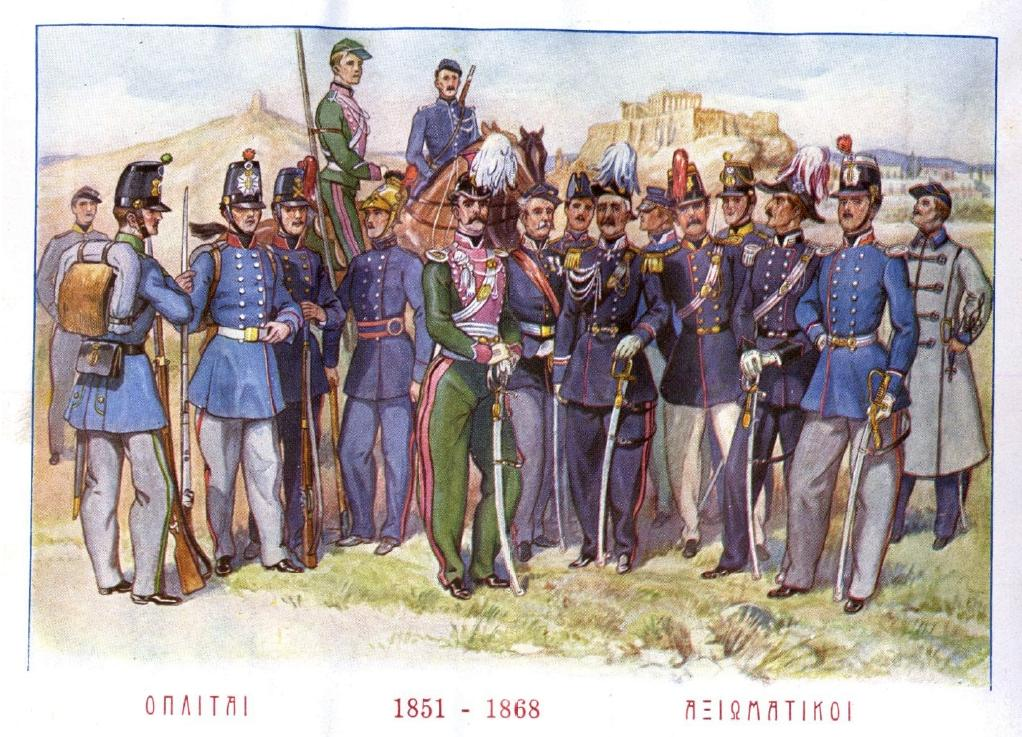
Uniforms of the Army in the last years of Otto's reign (1851–1862)

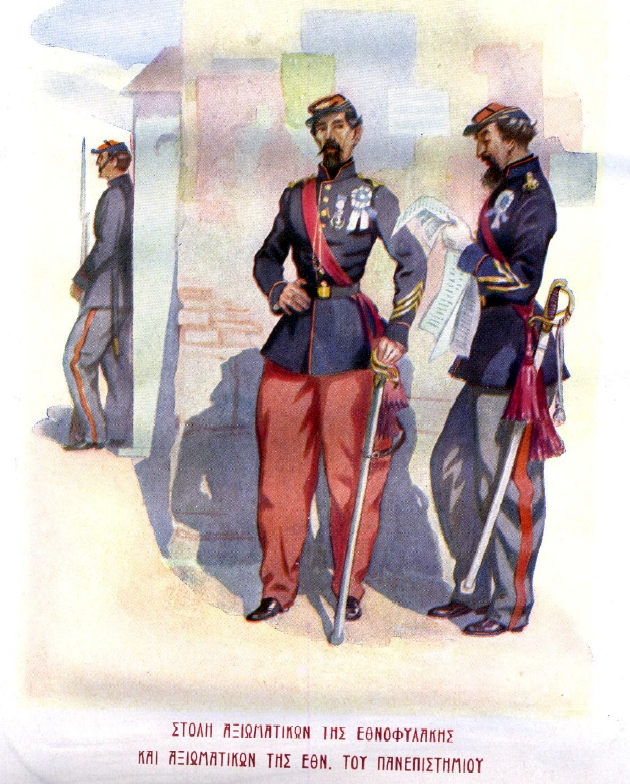
Uniforms of the National Guard in the interregnum after the overthrow of Otto (1862–1863)

== Late 19th century (1868–1908) ==
The new uniform, adopted in 1869, remained faithful to the French style. The officers' dress uniform ("great uniform", μεγάλη στολή) consisted of a dark blue, pocketless tunic with stand-up collar and epaulettes (double-breasted for artillery officers), with straight light blue trousers for line infantry and dark blue for other branches, while the shako was replaced by a kepi sporting a large feather plume for full dress. The cavalry again retained a separate uniform style, with dark green Hussar-style tunics and breeches, cherry red branch colour and silver braid. Other ranks wore a simplified version of the same uniform both as dress and field uniforms. For infantry, artillery and engineers this was characterized by short hip-length dark blue tunics with piping in the branch colour, white kepi covers in summer field dress and dark blue greatcoats in colder weather. The trousers were initially light grey, changing to a light blue shade about 1900. The leather equipment was black and of French design, to complement the standard-issue fusil Gras rifle. The officers' dress uniform was retained through subsequent changes in uniform styles, and continues in use today as the No. 1 uniform. Its modern use however is limited to those officers serving in the Army Academy.

The officers' field uniform followed Austro-Hungarian models, with the tunic being dark blue woolen in winter and white cotton during the summer, featuring fly-hidden buttons and scalloped pocket flaps. There were no epaulettes; rank was exhibited on the collar with tabs and bullion stars. Breeches were worn with high leather boots. French-style leather equipment and a sabre were carried in battle.

The Evzone battalions were also formed at the time, and acquired a uniform very similar to the one still used today as the ceremonial dress of the Presidential Guard.

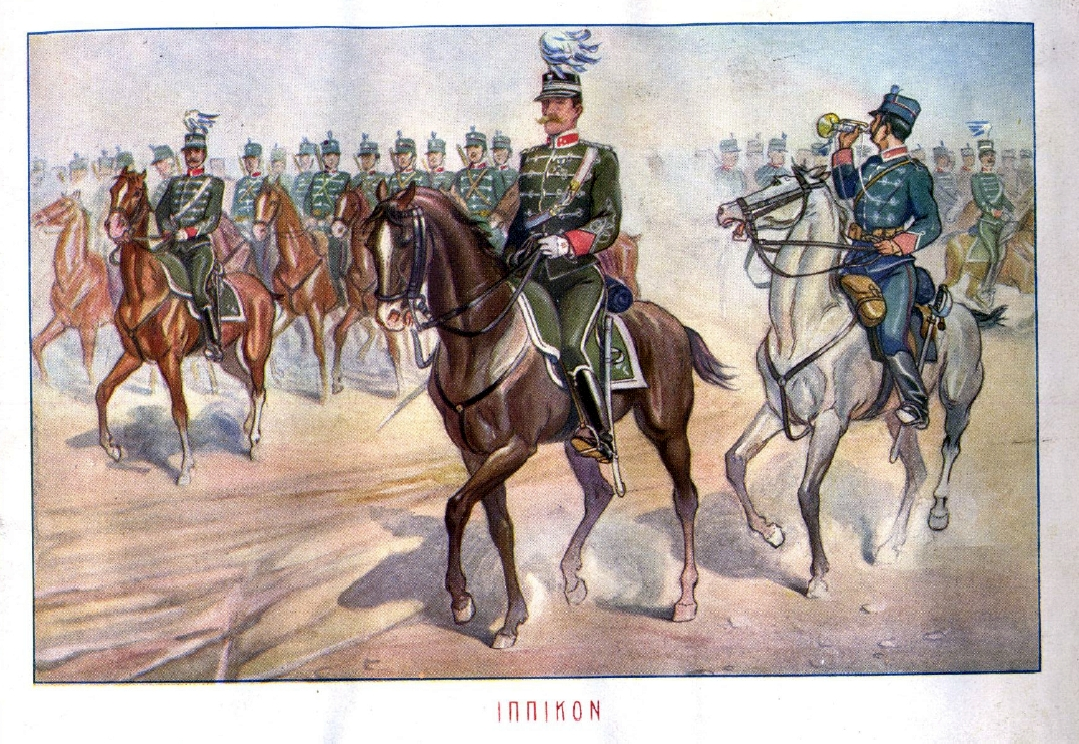
Greek cavalry, ca. 1890

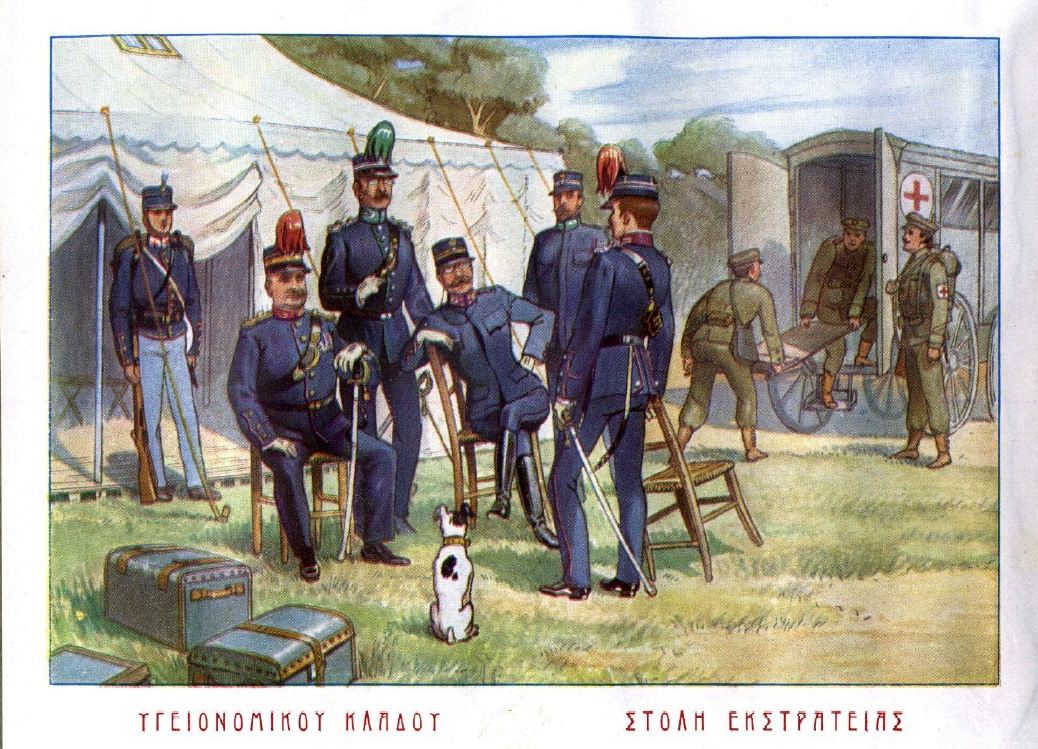
Uniforms of the Army's medical services, ca. 1890–1910

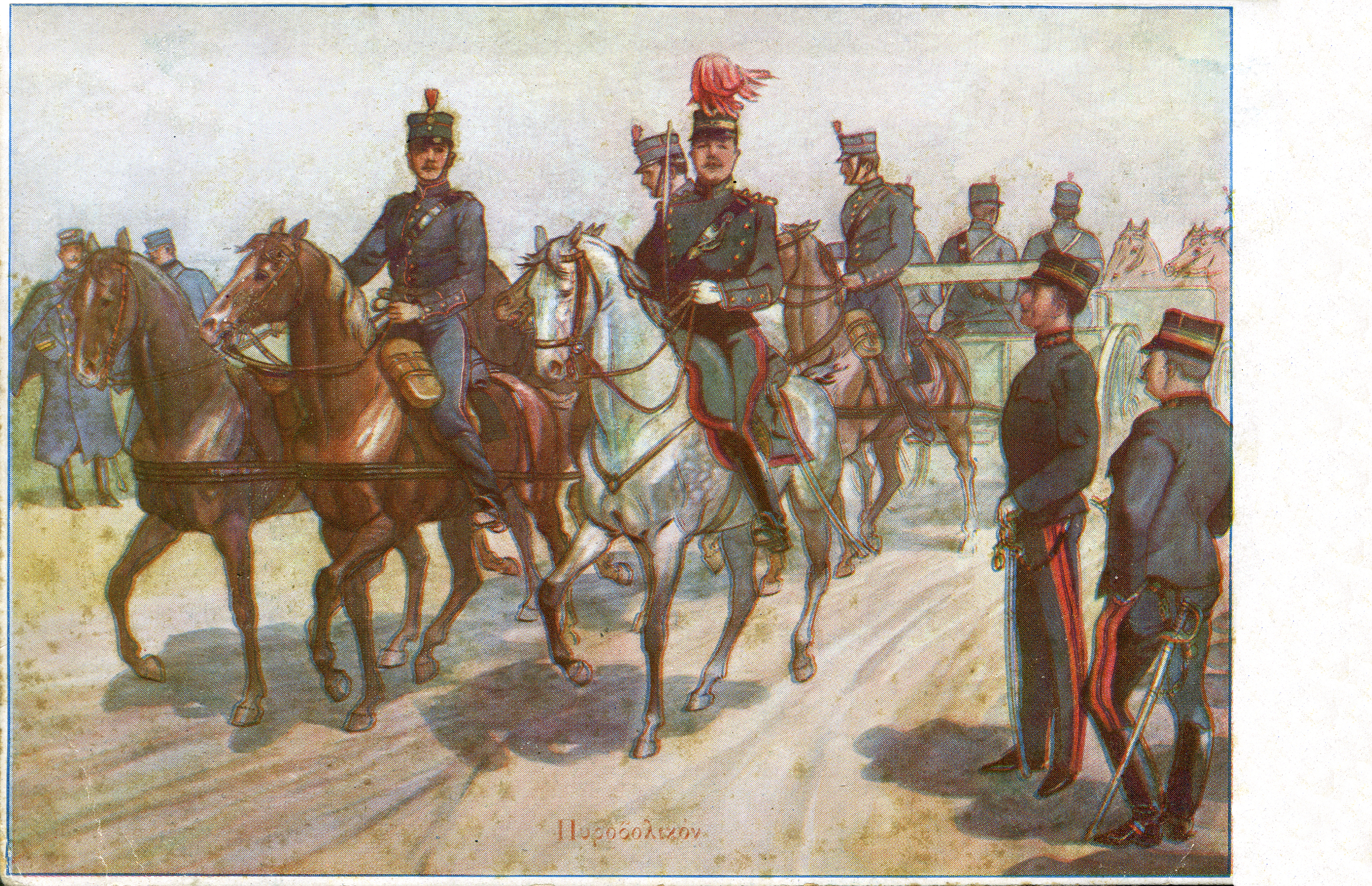
Uniforms of the Army's transport service, ca. 1890–1910

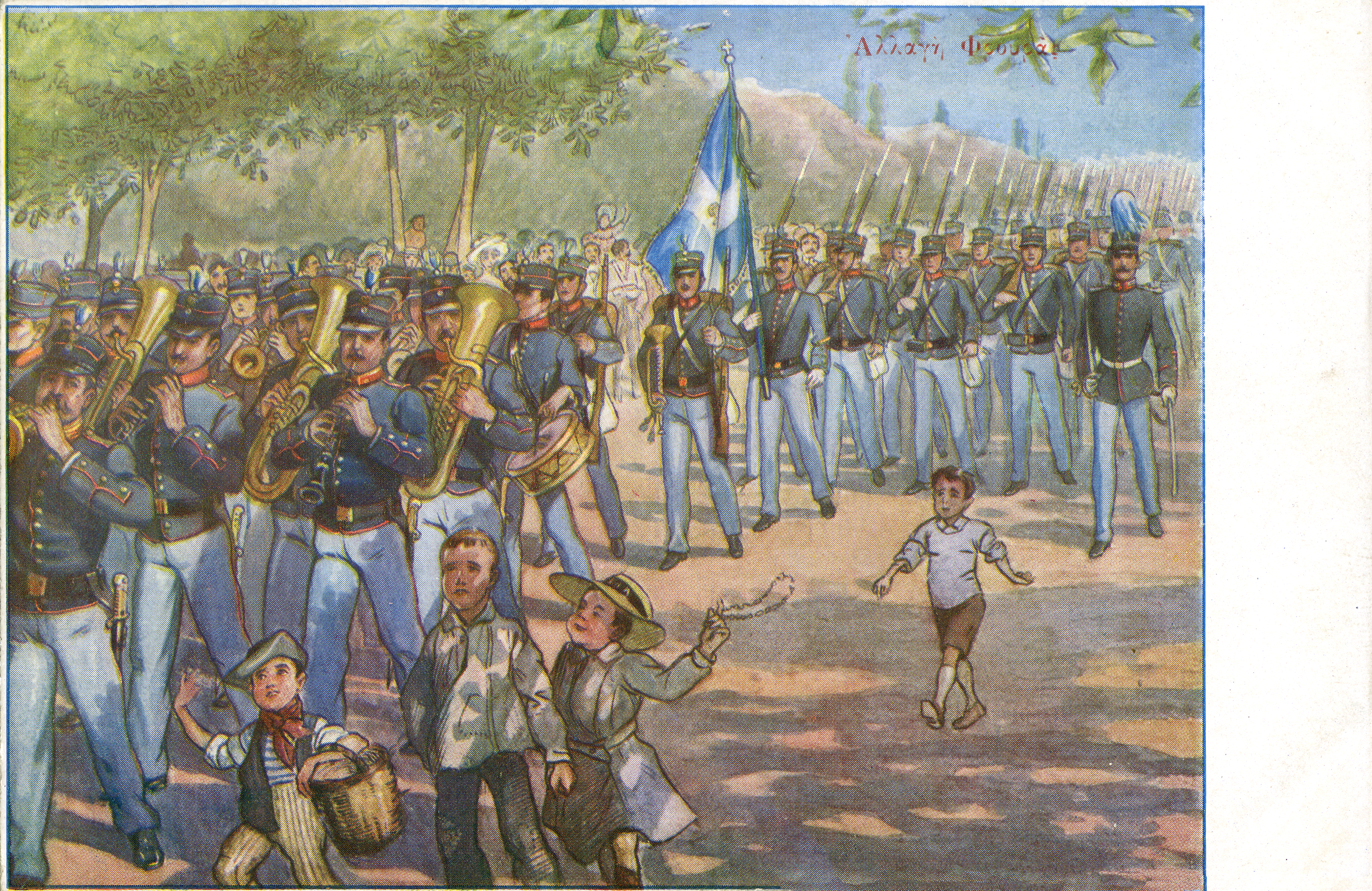
Line infantry changing the guard, ca. 1880–1910

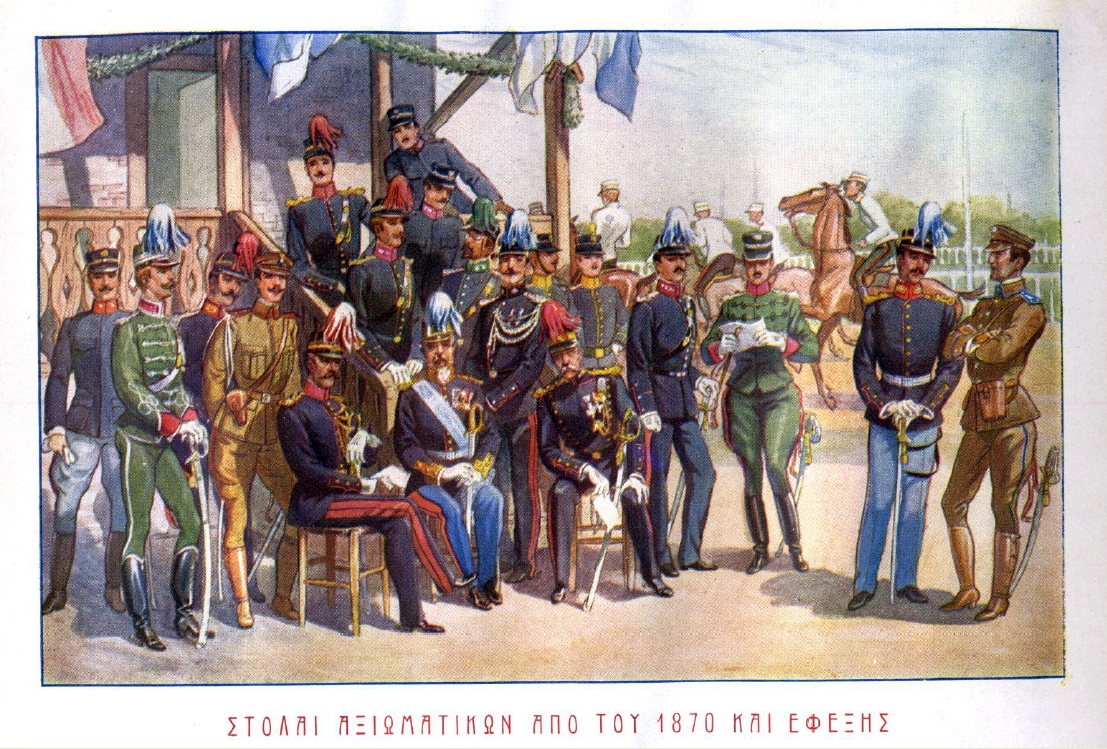
Officers from 1870 to 1910

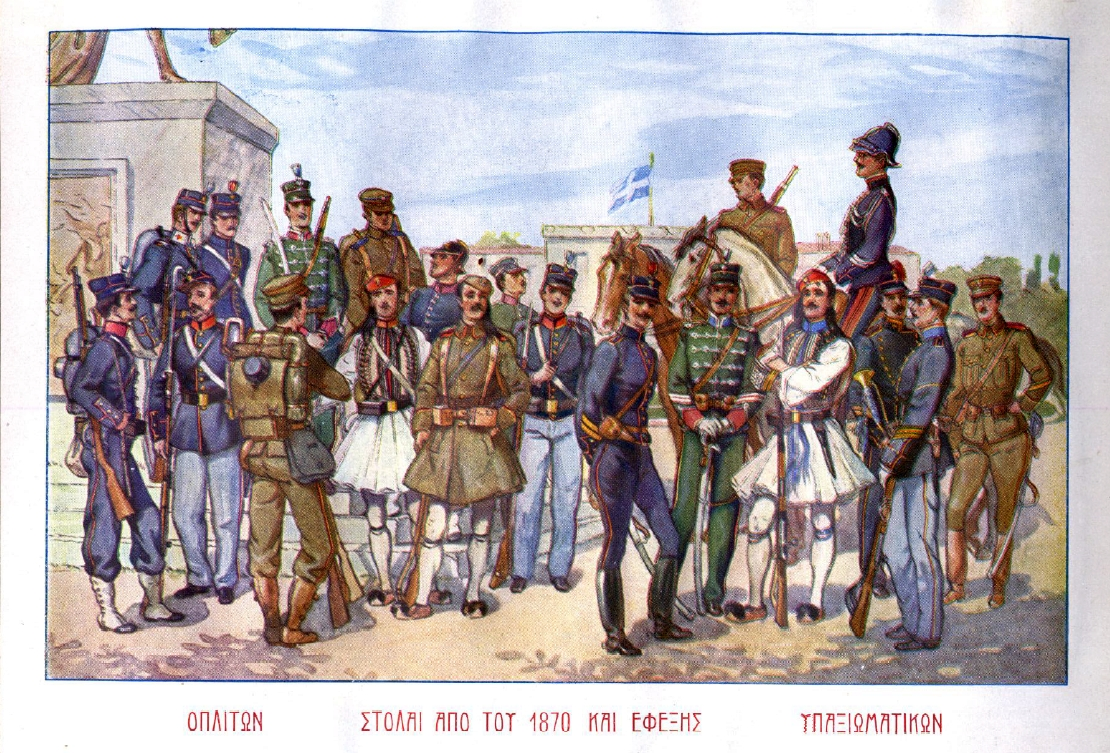
Soldiers and NCOs from 1870 to 1910

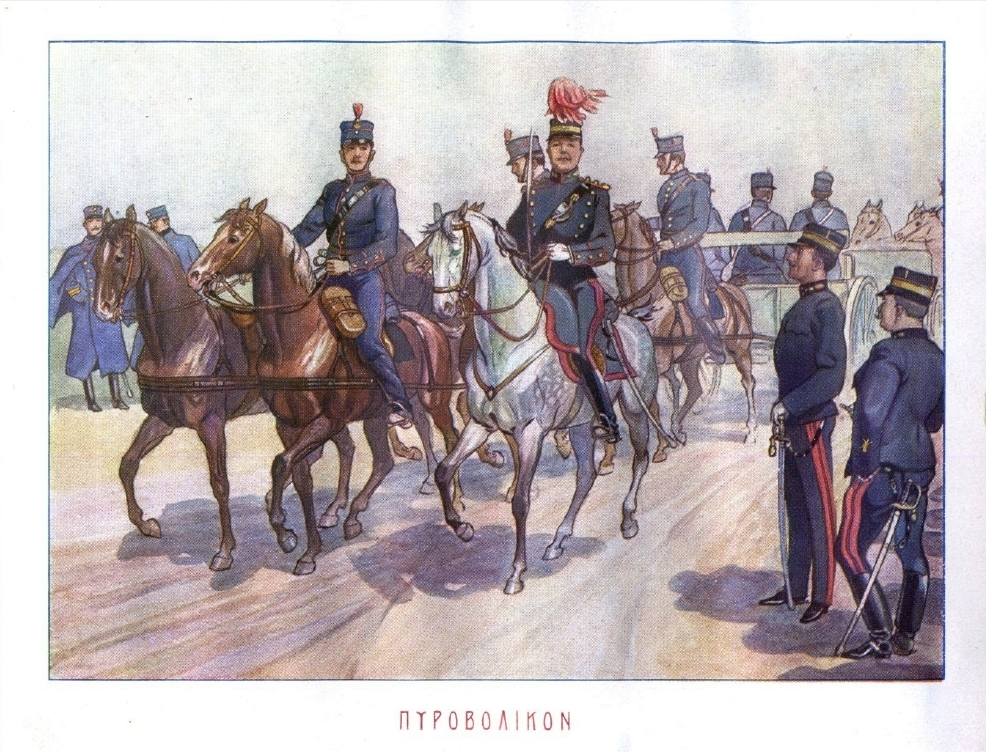
Artillery, 1890

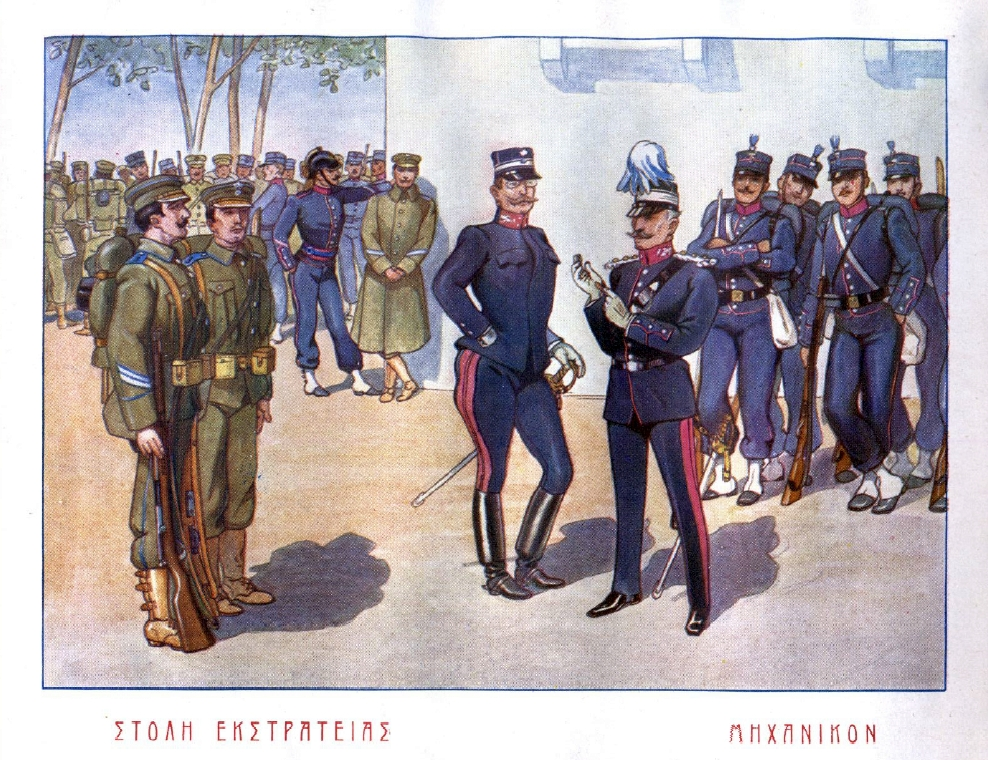
Engineers, 1910

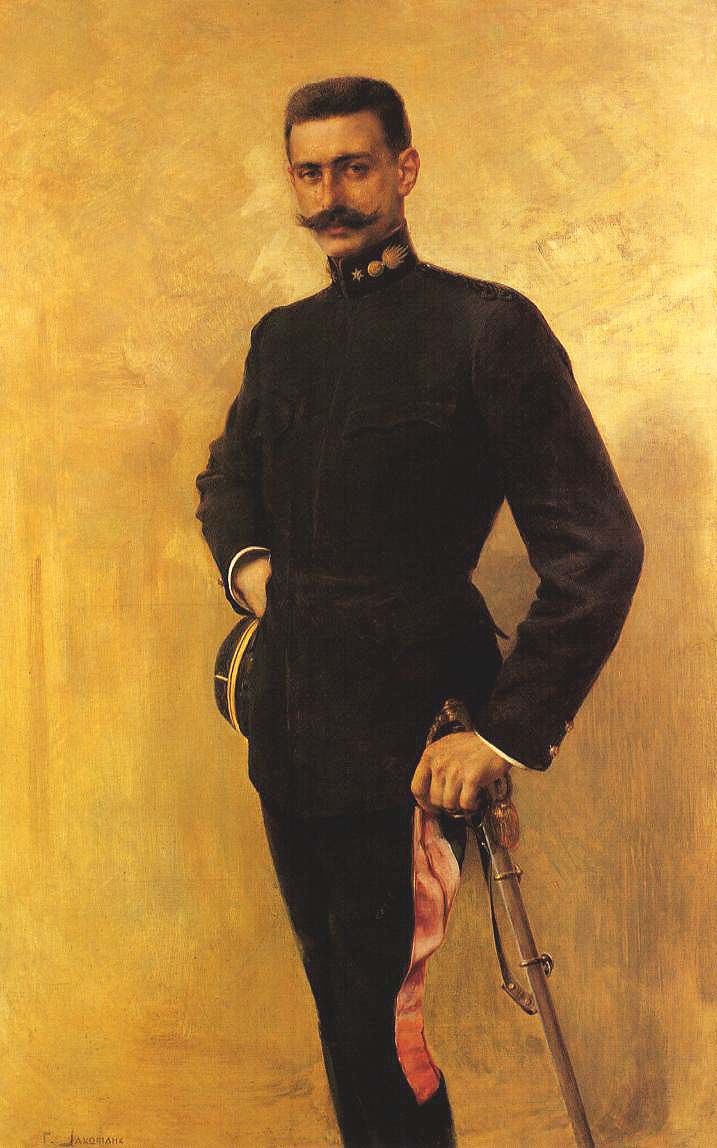
Pavlos Melas in the uniform of a lieutenant of artillery

== Around the Balkan Wars (1908–1915) ==
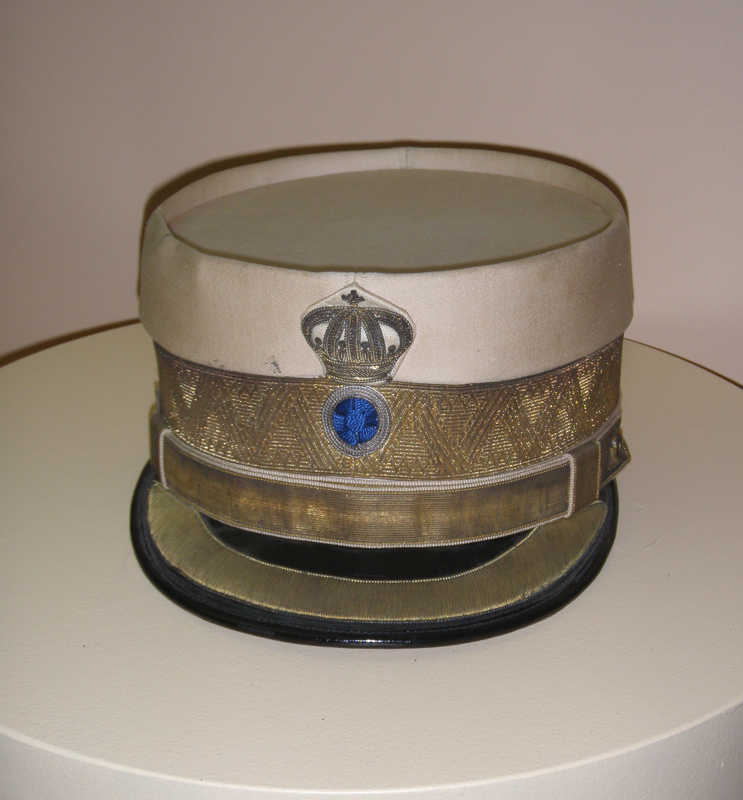
White summer version of the ceremonial uniform's kepi as worn by a lieutenant general, 1910

Infantryman during the Balkan wars

Following the humiliating defeat of 1897 by the Ottomans, the urgent need for modernisation was felt by both the Government and the Staff of the Greek Army. The idea of khaki uniforms was introduced, just a few years after the British had introduced their service dress, making Greece one of the first group of countries to adopt a modern look for its military. The use of off-white and drab uniforms was already common for summer use by officers, who traditionally had the option of choosing privately tailored items. It was soon expanded with the universal introduction of the khaki 1908 model for other ranks.

This uniform included a near-copy of the British four-pocket tunic of the time, in olive green wool cloth or serge, with the addition of pipings and removable shoulder boards in branch-of-service colour cloth (Red: Infantry and Staff; Bright red-purple: Cavalry; Dark red-burgundy: Artillery; Light Blue: Engineers; Dark Blue: Gendarmerie). Brass-metal buttons were used for the majority of uniforms. The trousers were straight with side-seam pipings in branch colours, designed to cover the ankle lace-boots. However, on campaign the majority of soldiers found this to be a cumbersome arrangement and used cloth puttees or stuffed the trouser bottoms into their boots to hold them tight. A khaki single-breasted greatcoat was issued for winter. The black equipment was also replaced by a natural-brown leather set.

The first type of headgear was a German-style peaked cap, but this was soon replaced by the older French-style kepi but now in khaki wool and leather chinstrap, adorned with branch-pipings and an embroidered Greek royal cockade. In periods of mobilization older stocks continued being used for auxiliary units, mainly older caps and items of black leather. Minor variations of the 1908 uniform and equipment were issued to specialist units, e.g. breeches, high-boots and bandoliers to cavalry troopers.

Similar developments followed with the officers' uniforms. After a period of unstandardised changes, these settled on the model 1910. Their smart tunic was made in a higher quality olive-green wool, incorporating the internal scalloped pockets and standing collar of the Austrian army, but with branch pipings and Russian-style rank boards. The headgear was a khaki kepi with leather peak, gold-metal pipings (silver for Cavalry and Engineers) and a bullion-cockade, and the pants were piped riding breeches, usually worn with high boots or ankle boots and puttees. The equipment was brown leather, with a French-style pistol holster and a binocular case. During this period, all officers took their sabres on campaign.

Between 1908 and 1910 the blue and green coloured uniforms were phased out and replaced by khaki for other ranks. Officers, Evzones on duty in Athens and cadets at the Military Academy retained ceremonial uniforms which remained more or less the same as those in use at the start of the 20th century; in navy-blue or dark green (for cavalry) with gold or silver officer's braiding. Full dress uniforms were worn with the historical kepi in elaborate designs. This survived as the "great uniform", virtually unchanged until the 1960s.

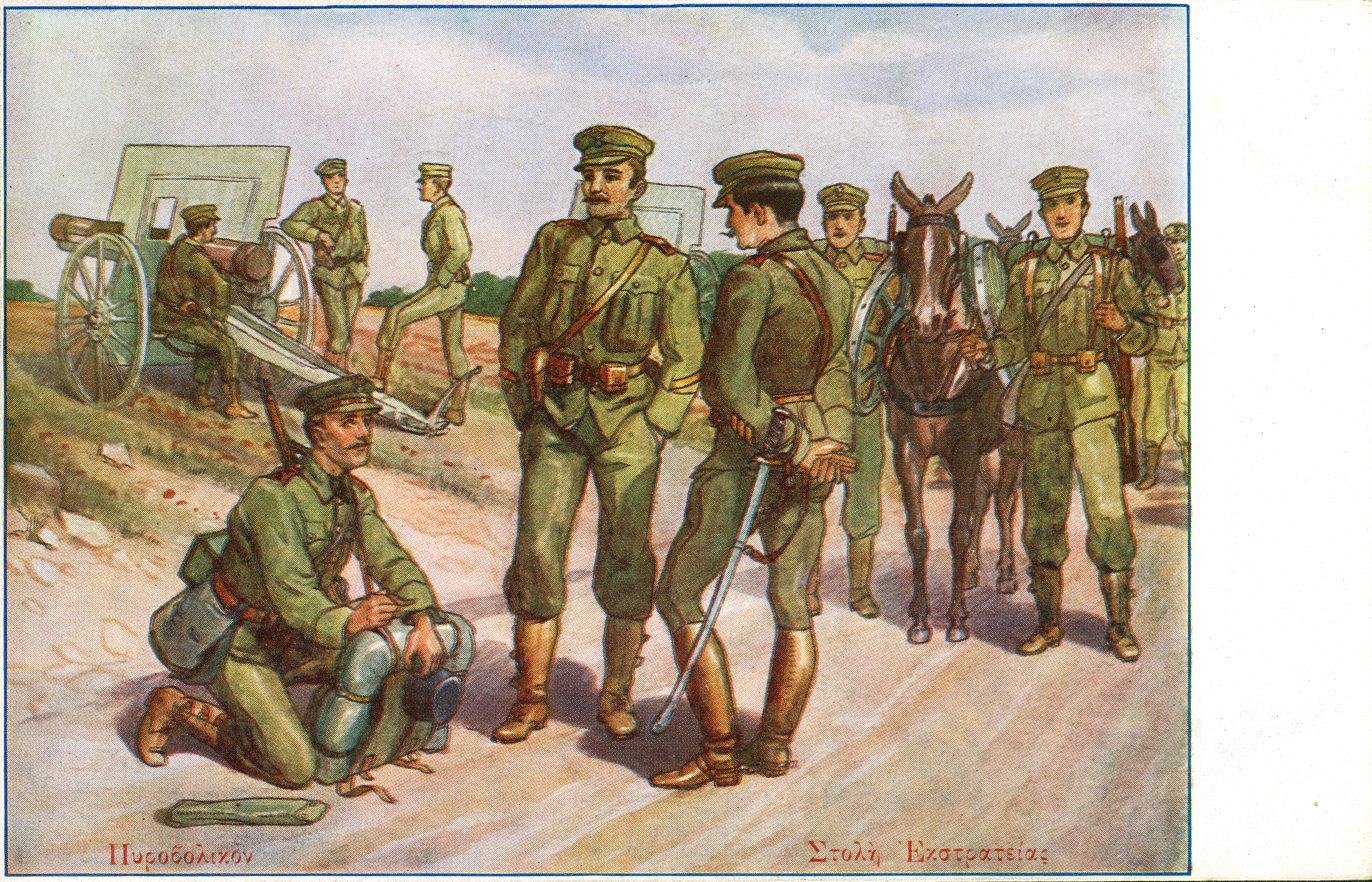
Greek artillerymen with the new khaki uniforms introduced in 1908

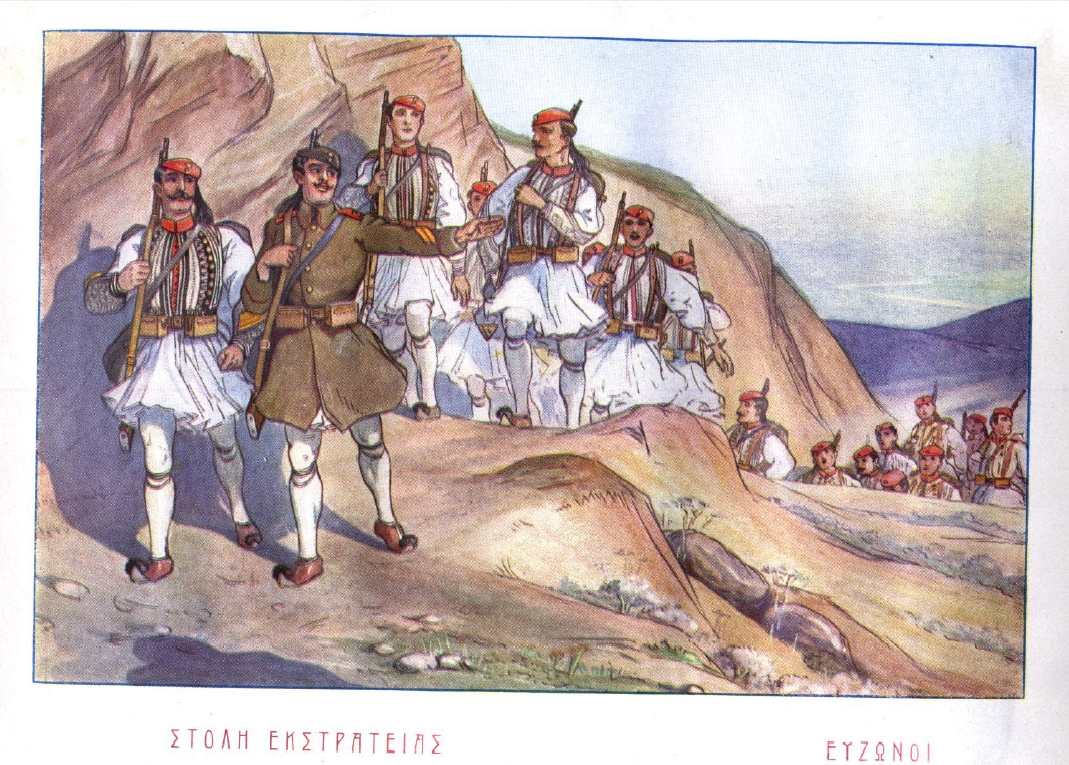
Evzones with their distinctive white uniform, and the post-1908 simplified khaki field dress

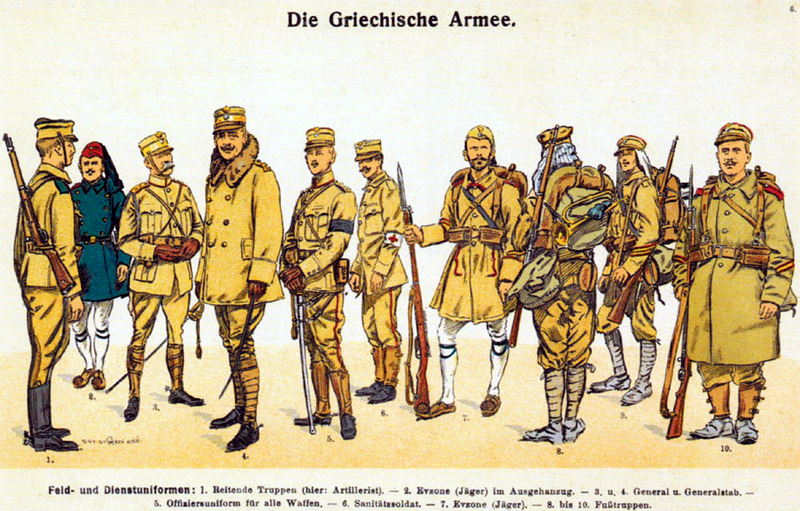
Field uniforms as worn during the Balkan Wars

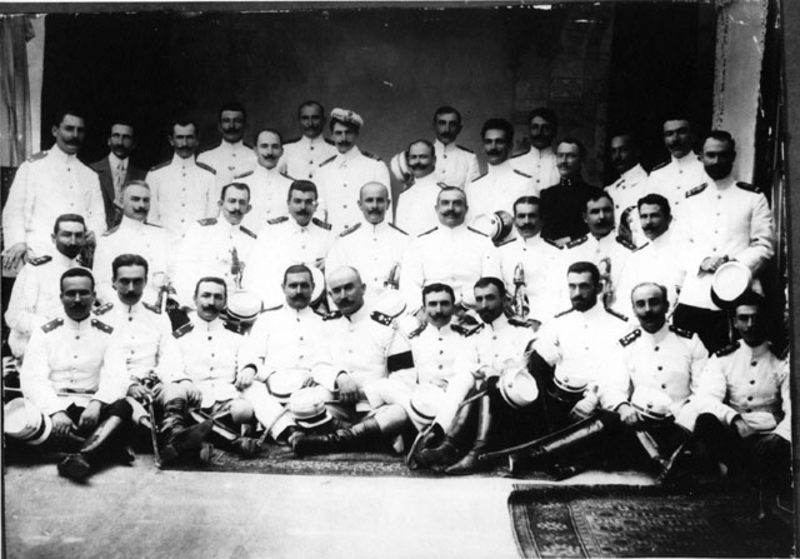
Army officers in white summer uniforms, c.1909

== During World War I and Greco-Turkish War (1915–1922) ==
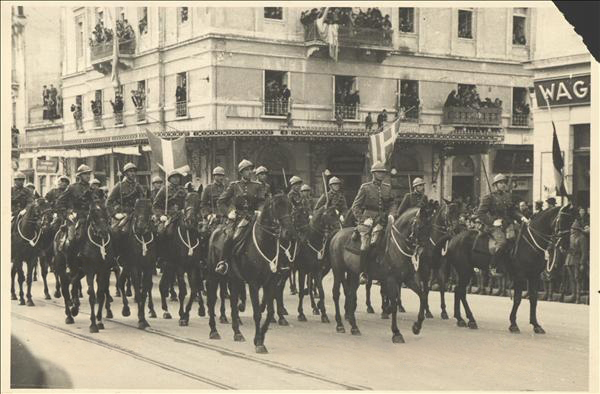
Greek cavalry on parade, 1926

The years 1913–1915 saw the introduction of many non-standard and transitional officer's uniforms, until finally, the new khaki wool model 1915 uniforms were introduced. These entailed minor changes to the other ranks' uniform, mainly simplification by removing most coloured decorations, introducing collar tabs in branch-colour and the standard issue of cloth puttees. Branch colours were revised to the following for easier identification (green for Cavalry; black for Artillery); blue for Engineers and Air Corps; raspberry red for Supply; brown for Ordnance; crimson for Medical Corps & Veterinary officers; orange for Pay Corps.

The officers' uniform changed though significantly, adopting the changes that were already implemented by King Constantine and his staff in their private tunics, plus a return to the German-style cap that Constantine preferred. The new tunic was more practical for campaign, closer to the modern French and British styles. Wider-cut, it had bigger, external pockets pleated on the breast, scalloped flaps and stand and fall collar. The pipings were replaced by a pair of branch-colour collar tabs with metal buttons and the Russian boards were replaced by smaller straps. The highly visible cap metal pipings were replaced with subdued rank stripes of brown colour. The old-style leather equipment was replaced by a fashionable Sam Browne and a Webley revolver-style holster.

The only major change introduced to the above uniform with the entry of Greece to the war in 1917, was the return of the kepi by the revolutionary government of Salonika. The kepi thus came to represent the Venizelos faction in the course of the National Schism against the Royalist government of Athens, and symbolised the alliance with the French-led Entente. When Constantine left in exile, the new government phased-in the kepi headgear for all the Army officers. Other items of French origin saw widespread use during these wars, including the Lebel rifle leather equipment, the Adrian helmet, painted dark olive and the bonnet de police in khaki wool. This uniform was used in Ukraine and Asia Minor, along with stocks of French World War I style that were rushed in to equip the excess troops. The main khaki service dress remained virtually unchanged until the late thirties.

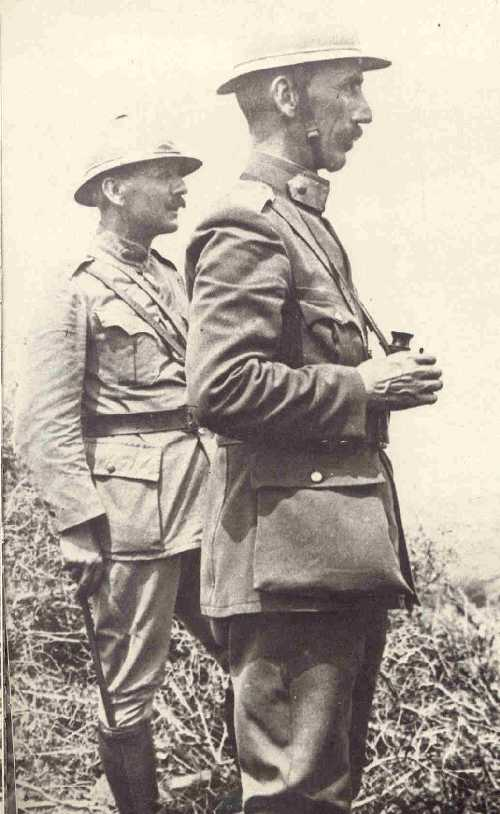
Major General Konstantinos Nider (right) and his Chief of Staff Colonel Theodoros Pangalos in the Macedonian front during World War I

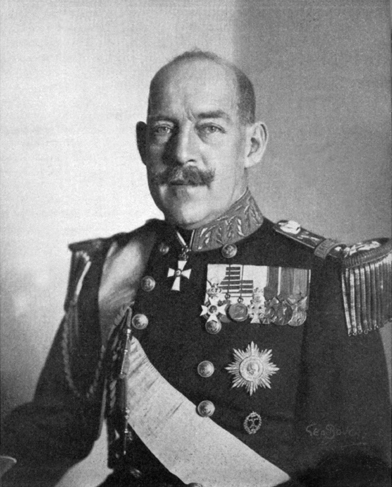
Constantine I of Greece as Field Marshal

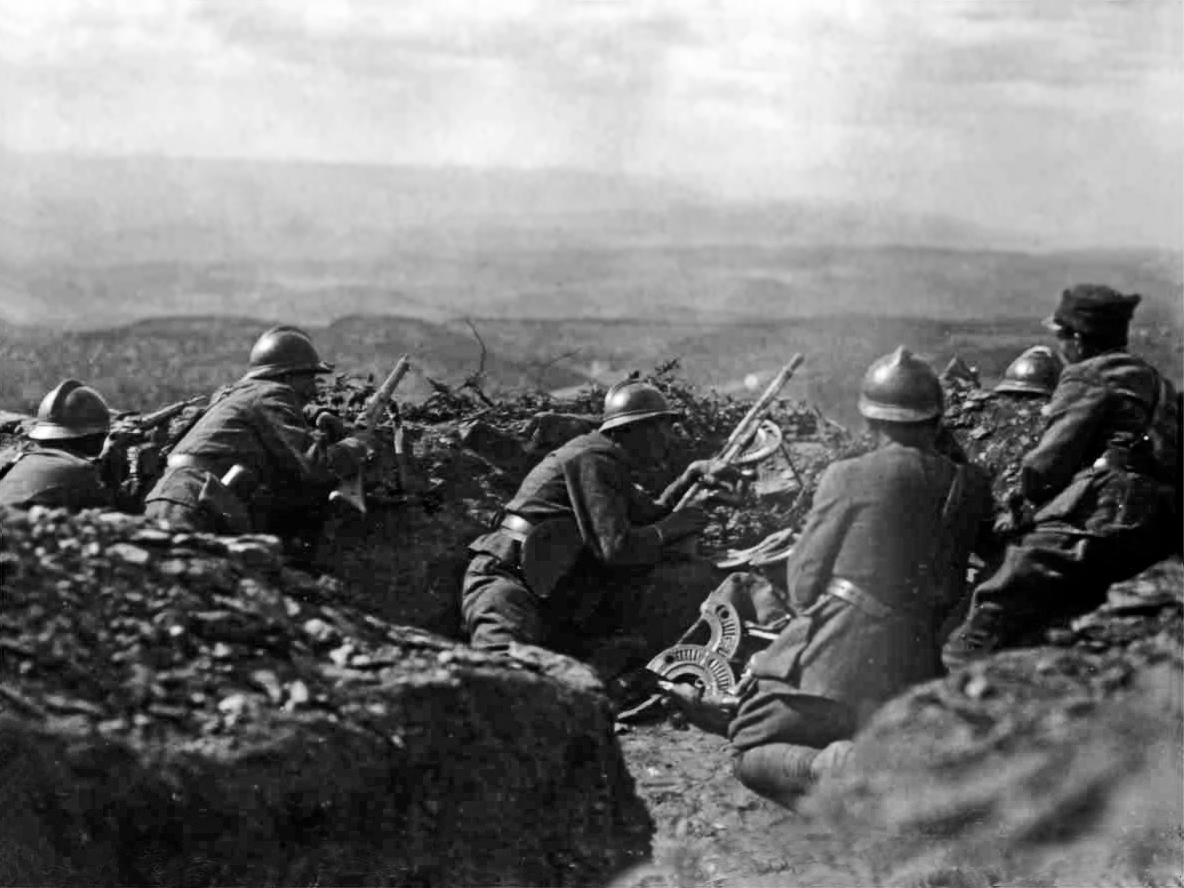
Greek soldiers during the Greco-Turkish War (1919–1922) wearing Adrian helmets

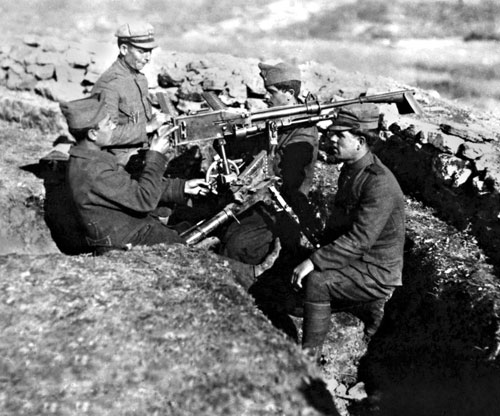
Greeks troops in Asia Minor

== Second World War ==
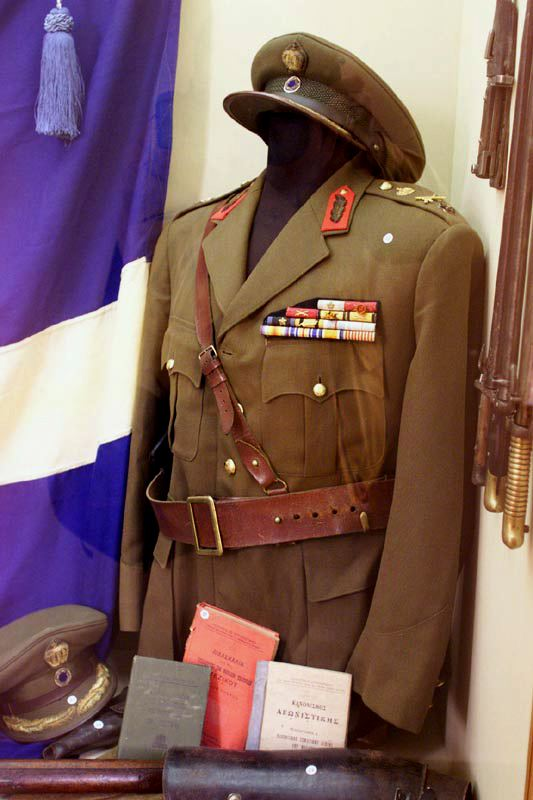
Uniform of a major general, late 1930s, War Museum of Thessaloniki

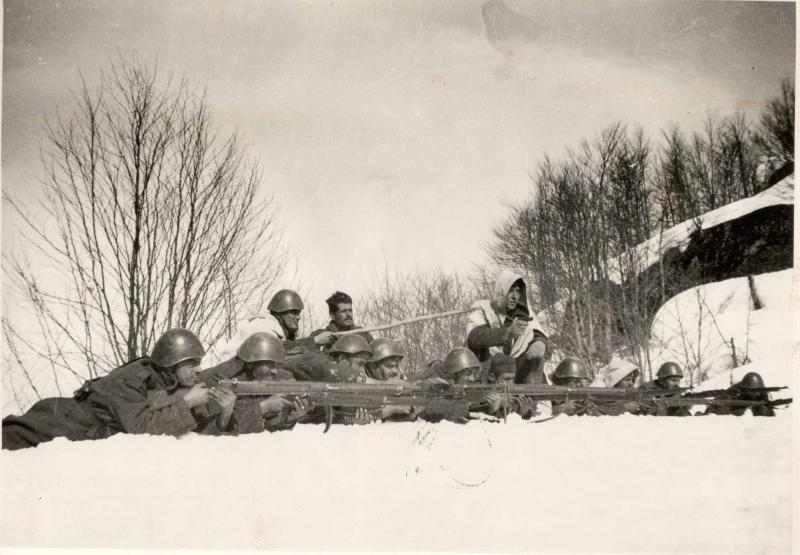
Unit during the Italian Spring Offensive wearing the Greek M1934/39 helmet

The 1908 pattern for other ranks in khaki wool remained virtually unchanged and was the uniform issued en masse to the troops that were deployed in the Greco-Italian War of 1940 and the brief Battle of Greece. Changes were significant only in the equipment, which by this time was a motley collection of Austrian, German, French and British patterns, reflecting a similar vast variety in personal arms. In contemporary pictures it appears though that the front-line troops had a relative homogeneous appearance. The majority were equipped with a new Model 1934 helmet, which was based on the contemporary Italian shell in field green colour, but without vents and with a locally produced leather liner. The main ammunition carrier was the Mannlicher twin-pouch and the Mauser triple-pouch, according to the rifle issued to the unit.

Significant number of older French-design Lebel stocks were still in use, especially in support troops. A minority of front-line troops were issued with the 1915 Adrian helmet and British Brodie helmet, as the newer pattern was not received in adequate numbers. Due to the heavy winter conditions in Albania, the outfit was for most of the campaign covered by the long model 1908 woolen overcoat, single breasted, with turned down collar and rear semi-belt. The decorations on these uniforms were limited to a minimum. Contrary to regulations, only a minority of tunics and coats had the prescribed branch-color collar tabs. These colors remained the same as in WW1, and expanded to include more specialist troops. A new pattern of NCO rank stripes similar to the British chevrons, did not see universal adoption before the outbreak of the war, and the older patterns were still seen.

The officers uniforms came in the thirties much closer to the British pattern of service dress with the adoption of an open collar intended to be worn with shirt and woolen tie, again with riding breeches, boots and a Sam Browne belt. The headgear in the late 1930s turned for good to a British-type leather peaked cap in khaki, with the exception of the Gendarmerie and the Hellenic Army Academy, who kept their traditional kepi. Officer rank insignia also changed from the colourful old Russian-style shoulderboards to a more subdued, British-style system. In 1938 a new pattern of forage cap was also introduced which was similar to the contemporary British, but with the Greek royal cockade in metal. By this time swords and sabres were limited to ceremonial use and a pistol was the main sidearm.

As the war progressed, much of the supplies were depleted and the Greek Army increasingly had to use new stocks of British military aid. At the last stages of the Battle of Greece, a significant number of troops was using battledress and the brodie helmet. The reconstituted free Greek Army in Egypt was completely reequipped with British uniforms and arms, which they kept throughout the Italian campaign and the first stages of the Greek Civil War. During these years, the new Greek Army was, outwardly, virtually indistinguishable from the forces of the British Commonwealth.

== Post war ==
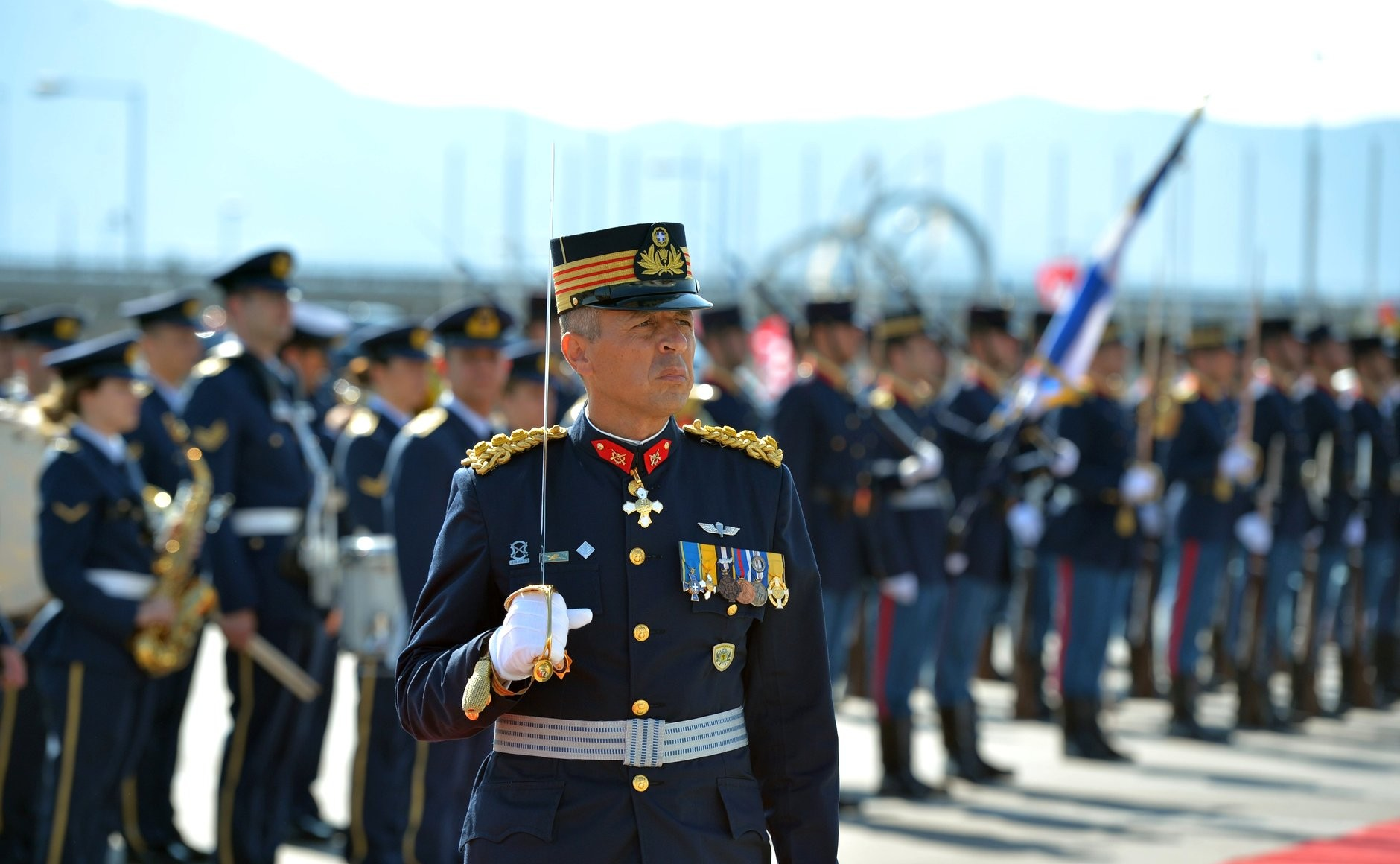
Officer in ceremonial uniform 2016

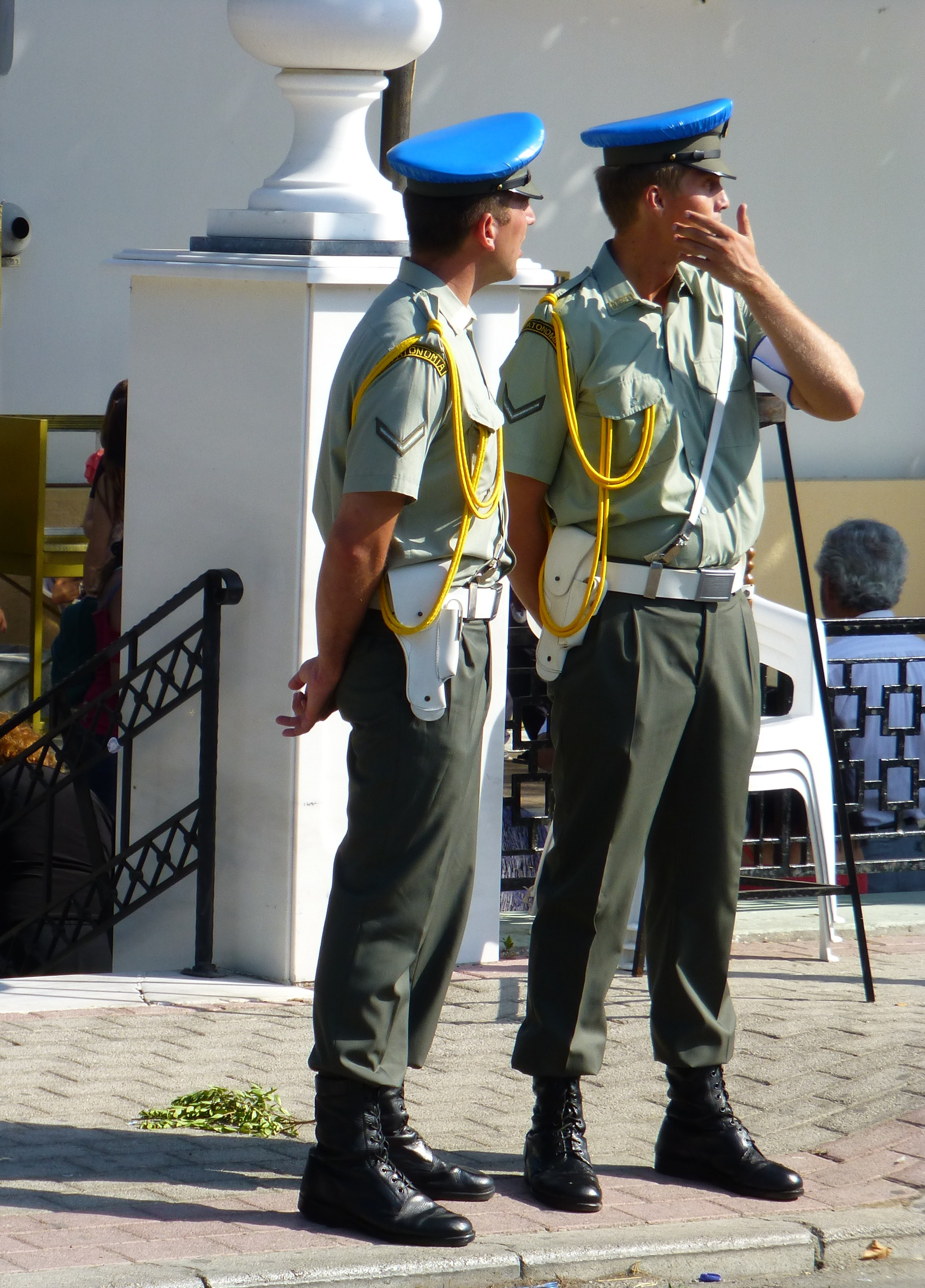
Men of the modern Greek Military Police (Stratonomia)

The loyalist National Army fought the Greek Civil War in British khaki battledress, wearing Brodie helmets, equipped in the majority with British arms. During their participation in the Korea War, the Greek Army was amply supplied with American stocks, parts of which they continued using in the sixties. Officers' uniforms were virtually identical to the British battle dress and service dress of the era.

The woolen battledress was progressively replaced during the years of the Military Junta of 1967–1974, giving a more US-like appearance with olive green cotton fatigues and webbing, along with the general issue of locally produced M1 helmets in dark green colours. Dark-green service uniforms inspired by the then-current US style were also developed for officers in the 70s, while insignia and ranks continued to follow the British pattern as before. Limited issues had been made of camouflage uniforms to elite units, such as the Alpine Commandos (LOK), since the 1960s. The camouflage pattern chosen was the French lizard type. This became the basis for the universal issue of camouflage clothing to all troops by the early 1990s, when the Greek Army achieved its current appearance in uniforms. On 4 February 2025, the Greek Defense Minister Nikos Dendias announced the transition of the Greek Army to a new fighting uniform which will be completed in 2030.
