= War Museum of Chania =

Former museum in Greece

Coordinates: 35°30′40.73″N 24°1′30.55″E

War Museum of Chania was an old museum in Chania, Crete, Greece that no longer exists. It was burnt down by fire in 2018.

It was a branch of the War Museum of Athens. Part of the Firkas Fortress in Chania has been granted to the War Museum in Athens, for the development of a new Chania War Museum Branch. This was granted by Lina Mendoni, Minister of Culture and Sports, and endorsed by the Central Archaeological Council (KAS). With the assistance of the Municipality of Chania, studies are being prepared and conversion of the space is forthcoming. The War Museum, located in Athens, is the largest museum of military history in Greece and one of the largest in southeastern Europe. The War Museum has multiple branches including in Nafplio, Thessaloniki and Tripoli.

The previous location was founded in July 1995. The museum exhibited photographs, war artifacts and other items from the national wars and revolutions of the Greek History. It was housed in a building, built in 1870 and designed by the Italian architect Makouzo, which in the past had been used as barracks by the Italian Army during World War II. On 7 Oct. 2015 it was closed up and appeared to have been in this state for some time. There were no notices to say if the exhibitions had been moved elsewhere. On 22 July 2018, at 21:30 in the evening a fire broke out inside under unclear conditions. The building was completely destroyed, with no exhibits in place after being moved after an earthquake that had caused static problems in the building.

== See also ==
- Athens War Museum
- War Museum of Thessaloniki
