= Greek M1934/39 helmet =

Metal combat helmet

M1934/39 helmet
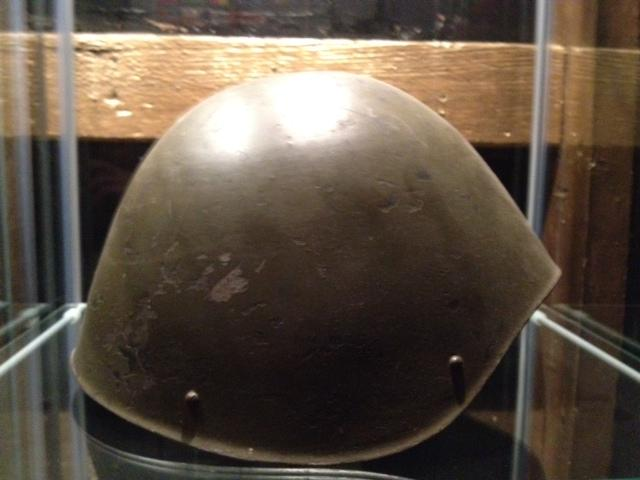
- Type: Combat helmet
- Place of origin: Italy/Greece

Service history
- In service: 1934–1960
- Used by: Greece; Greek Resistance; Provisional Democratic Government; Italy; Germany
- Wars: Second World War; Greco–Italian War; Greek Civil War; Korean War; Turkish invasion of Cyprus

Production history
- Designed: 1934
- Produced: 1934–1941

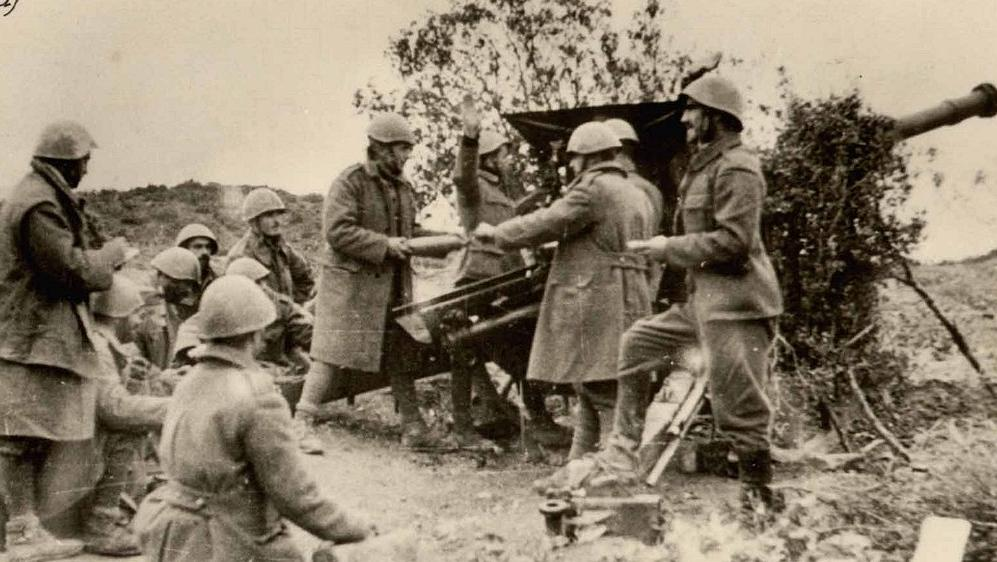
Greek soldiers wearing the M1934/39 helmet.

The M1934/39 helmet was the primary combat helmet used by the Greek Armed Forces during the Second World War. Greece purchased these helmets from Italy prior to the conflict as a replacement for their World War I-era Adrian helmets and refitted them with locally manufactured liners.

== Background ==
The M1934/39 was initially produced and tested in Italy as a possible replacement for the Italian military's World War I era Adrian helmets. The helmet did not meet their standards however, and they were sold to Greece as bare shells just before the outbreak of World War II. Once the Greeks received the M1934/39's they painted them green and added their own liners and chin straps. These liners were made from leather and featured seven 'tongues'. One of the 'tongues' was marked with a crown and the words ΕΛΛΗΝΙΚΟΣ ΣΤΡΑΤΟΣ ("Greek Army"). Due to the sudden onset of hostilities between Greece and Italy, Greece did not receive the total number of helmets ordered and as a result, was unable to equip their entire army with the M1934/39.

== World War II and beyond ==
After Italian and German forces overran Greece in 1941 (see Battle of Greece) many captured M1934/39's were reissued to occupying troops and used within the country until the end of the war. Once hostilities ceased in 1945 however, Greek authorities refitted a large number of these helmets with British-style leather liners and put them back into service with various police units until the 1960s.

== Gallery ==
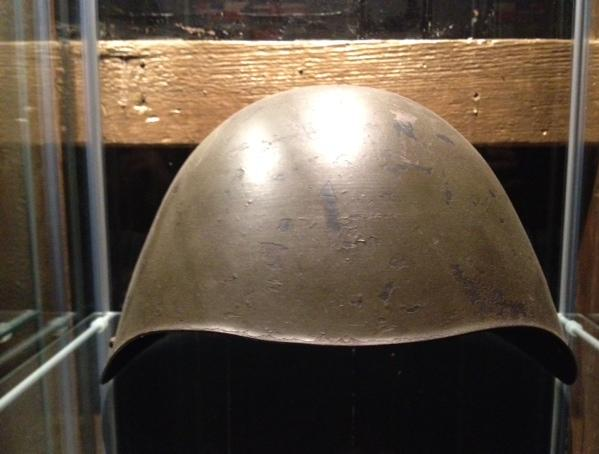
Front view of the M1934/39.

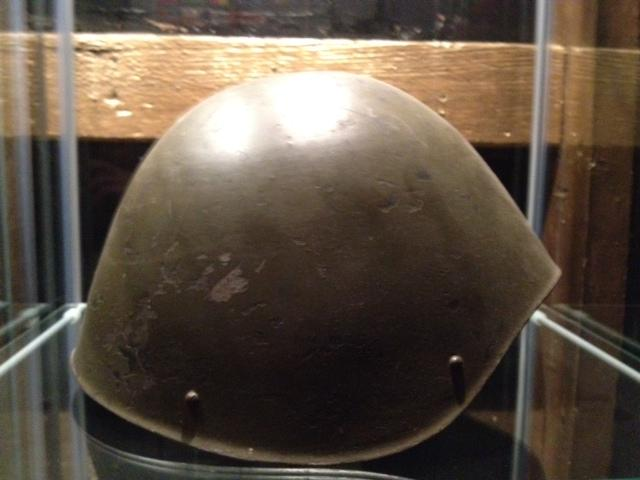
Side view of the M1934/39.

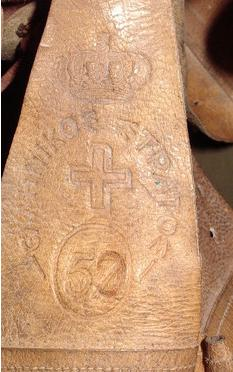
Interior tongue with the words "ΕΛΛΗΝΙΚΟΣ ΣΤΡΑΤΟΣ".

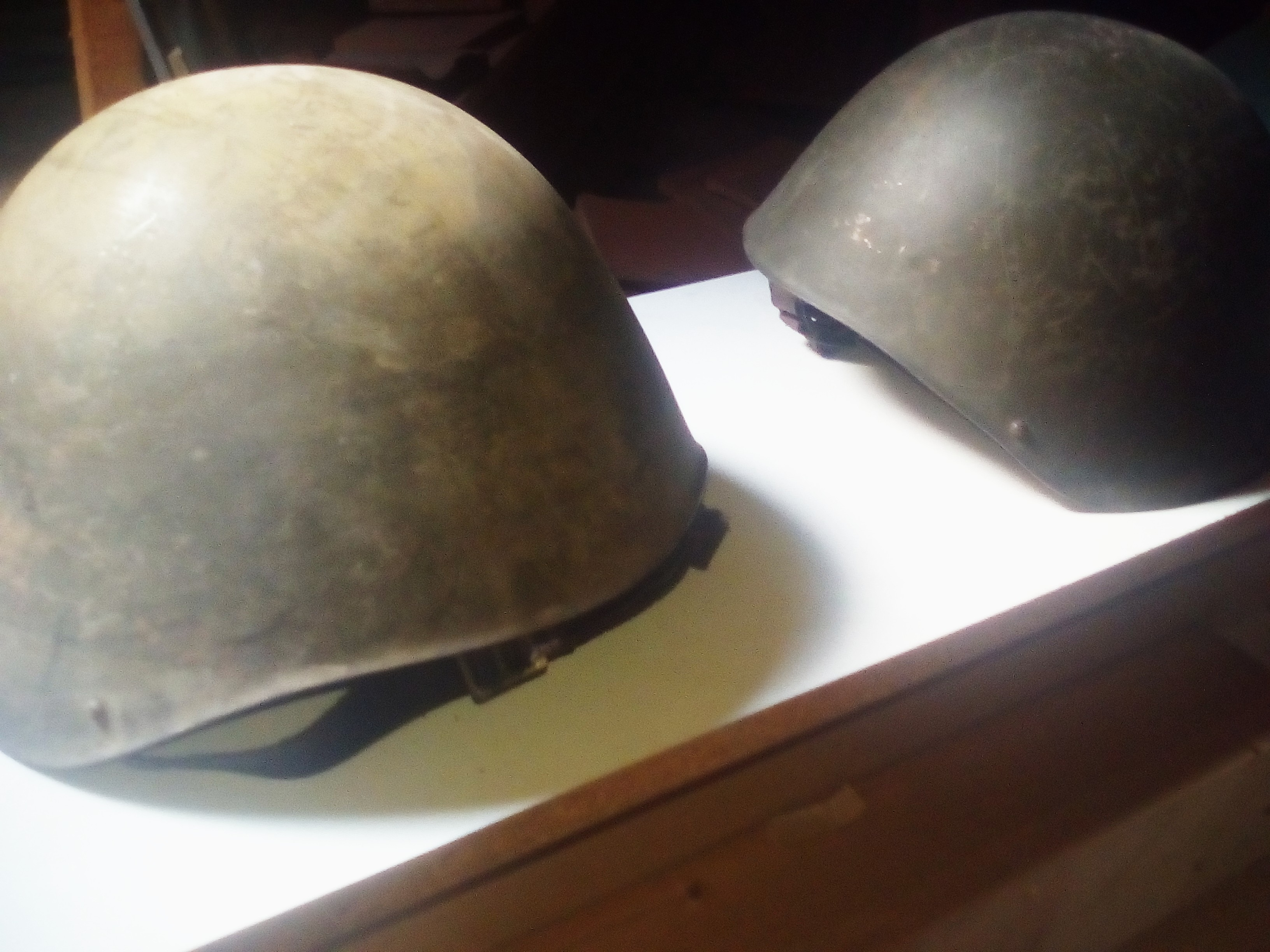
Sizes 55 and 57, personal private collection.

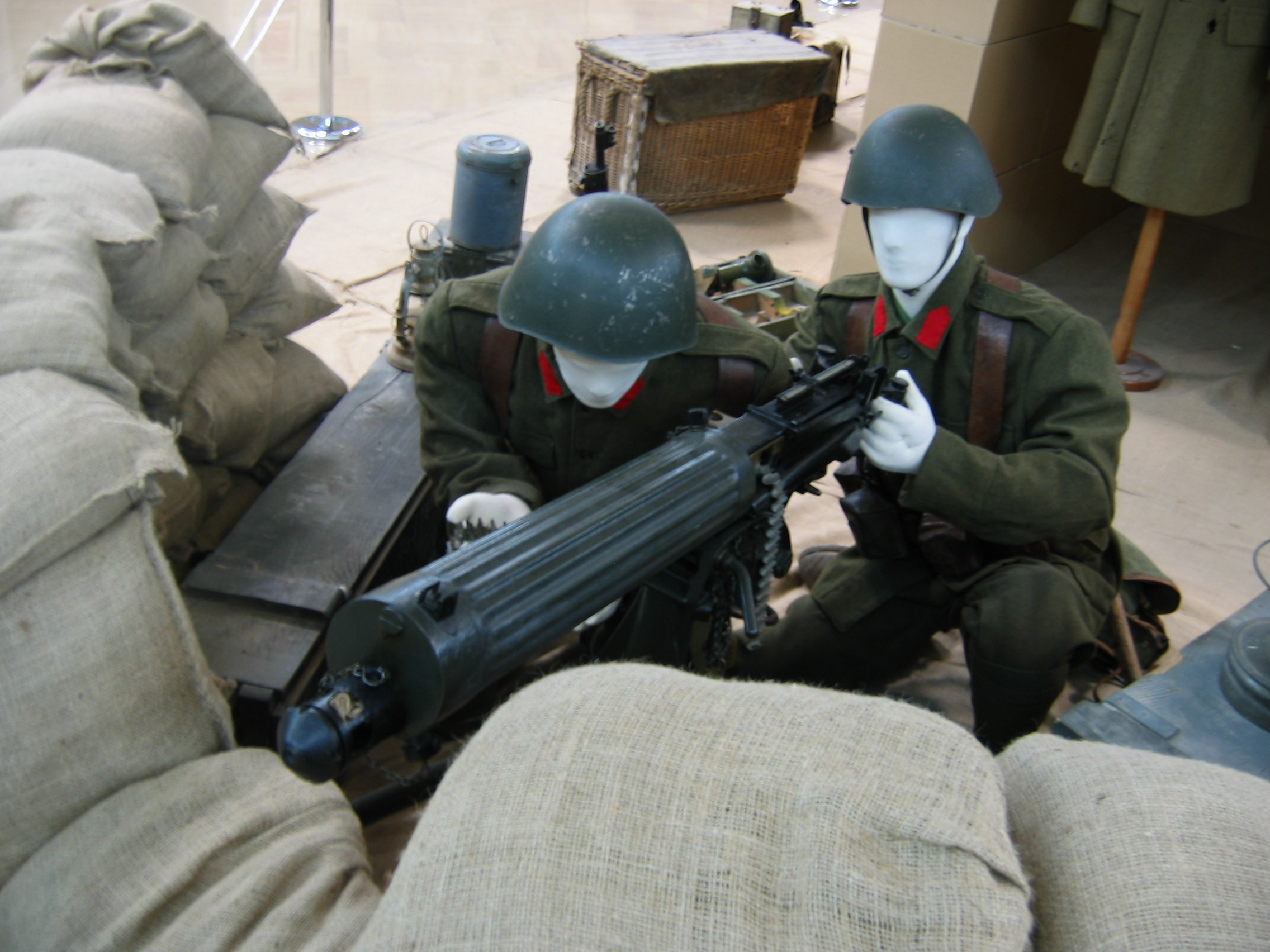
Uniforms of WWII in the War Museum of Thessaloniki.
