= War Museum of Thessaloniki =

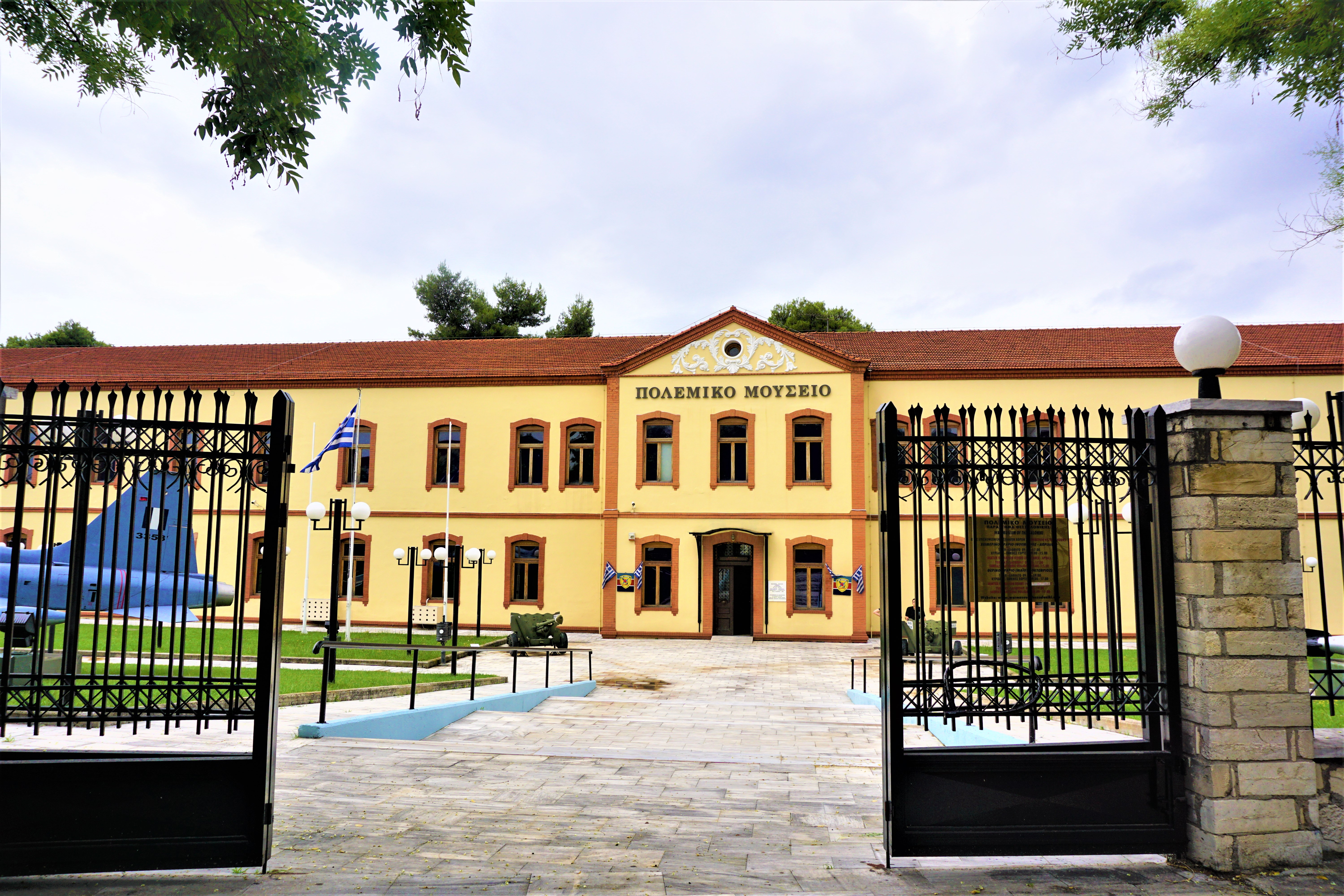
- Facade
- Established: 2000
- Location: Grigoriou Lampraki 4, 54636 Thessaloniki
- Coordinates: 40.624°N 22.9596°E
- Type: War Museum

The War Museum of Thessaloniki (Greek: Πολεμικό Μουσείο Θεσσαλονίκης Polemiko Mousio Thessalonikis) is a military museum in Thessaloniki, Central Macedonia, Greece.

Thessaloniki War Museum opened in October 2000. It is housed in a building designed by architect Vitaliano Poselli and erected between 1900 and 1902.

The museum's mission is to help preserve military historical memory and heritage in Northern Greece.

The permanent collections show events which were a watershed in Modern Greek history from the turn of the 20th century to the liberation of Greece from German forces at the end of World War II. They include photographs of the era, Hellenic army, air force and navy uniforms, weapons of the army, replicas of artillery and ships, works of art, stone engravings, maps, paintings, postcards, and similar items from the armies of other Balkan countries.

These exhibits give insight to the Balkan Wars, World War I, the Asia Minor Campaign, the Greco-Italian War, the Battle of the Forts in eastern Macedonia, the Battle of Crete, the Occupation and the Resistance, the part played by Greek forces in Allied action in North Africa, Italy and Normandy, as well as the liberation from the forces of occupation.

In addition to exhibition spaces, the War Museum has an amphitheatre, a multi-purpose hall, a library of writings on history and war, and a giftshop.

== Gallery ==
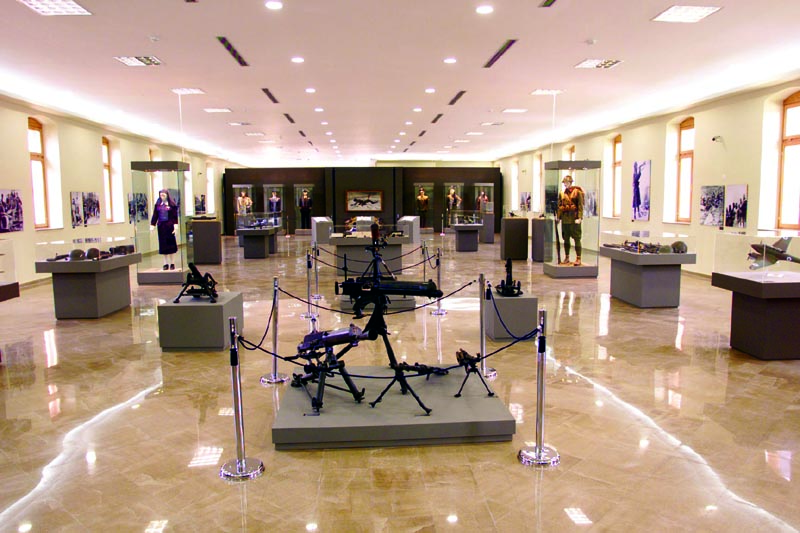
Interior

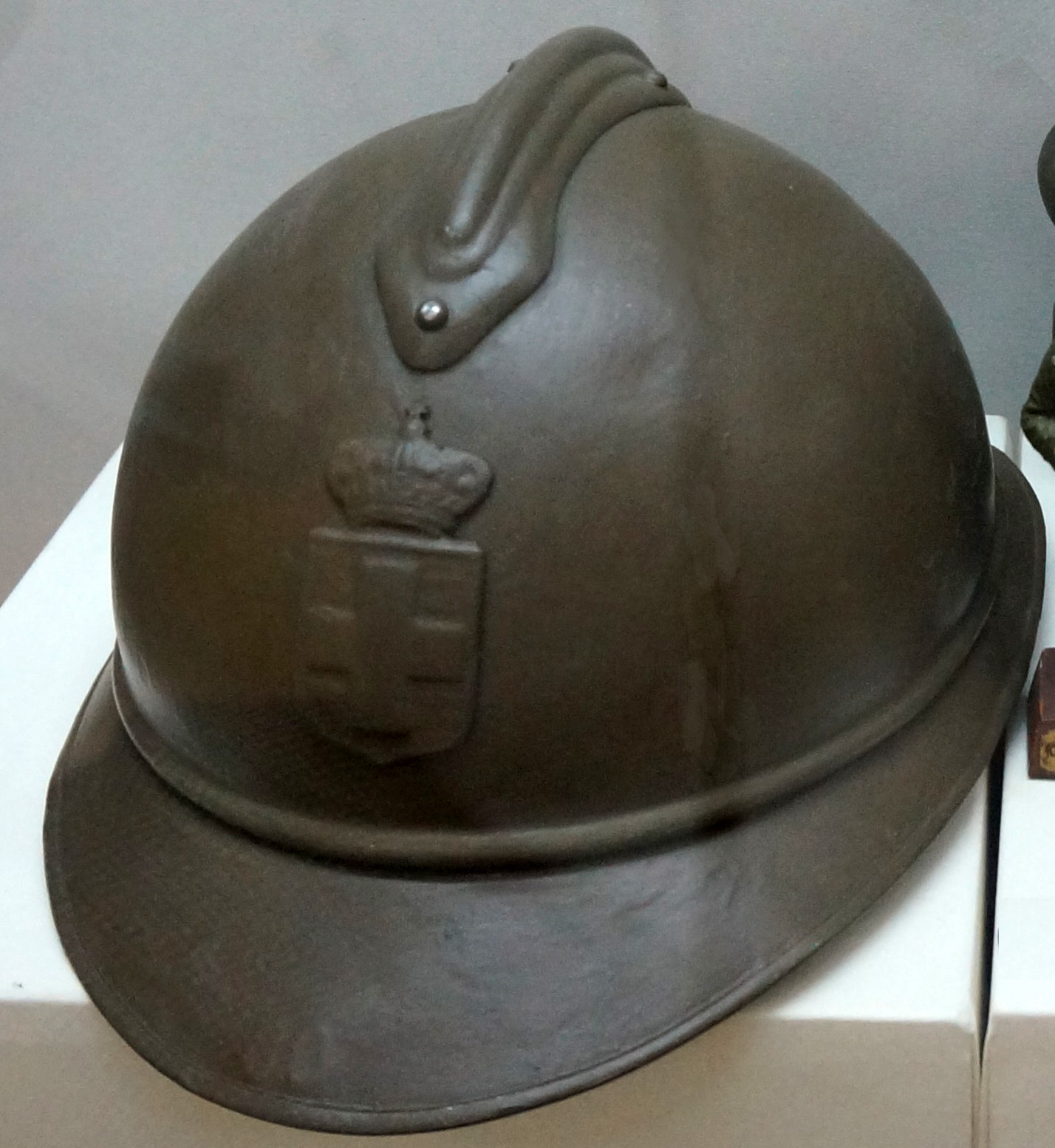
WWI Adrian helmet of Greek army

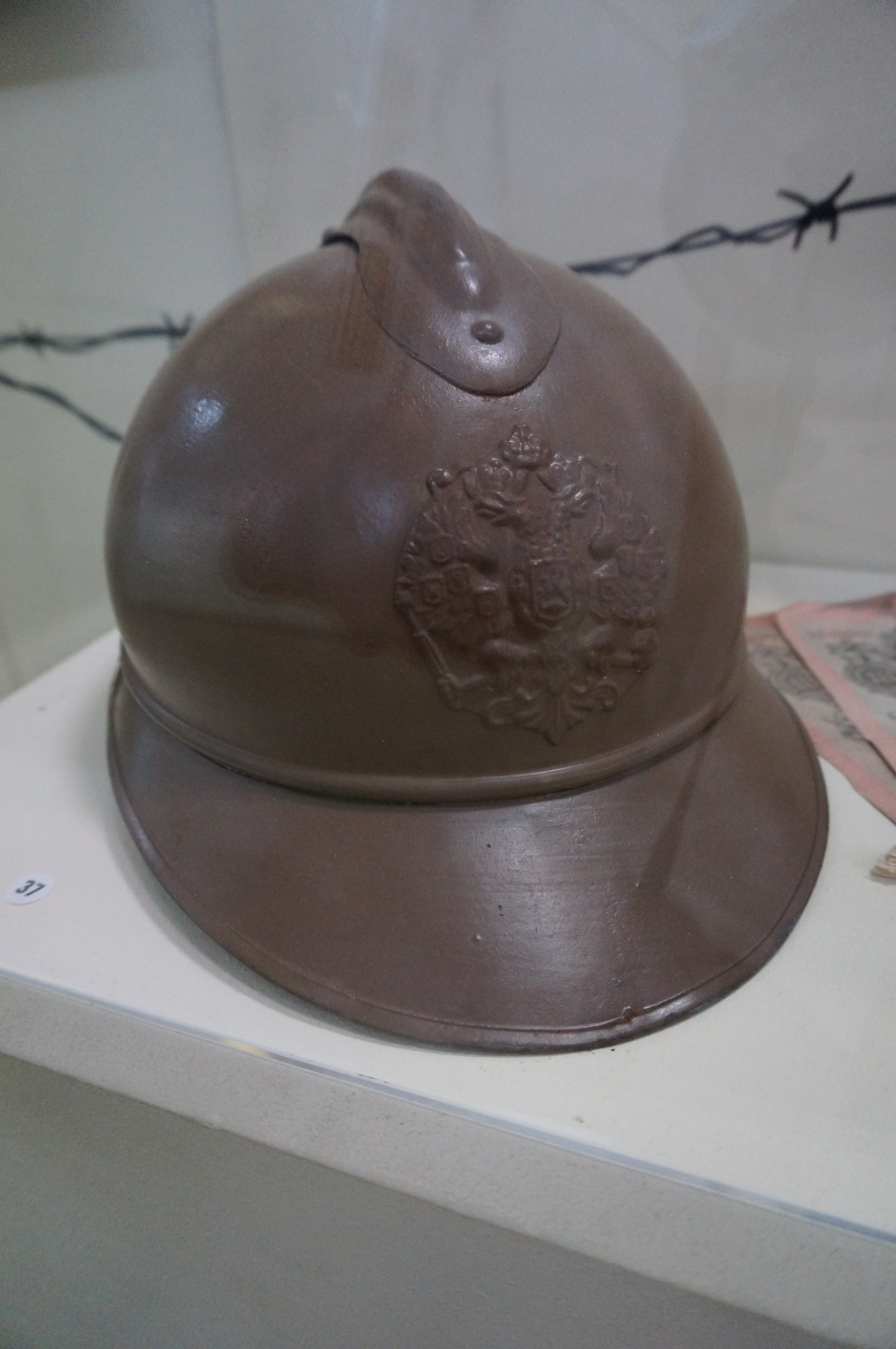
Adrian helmet (Russian army)

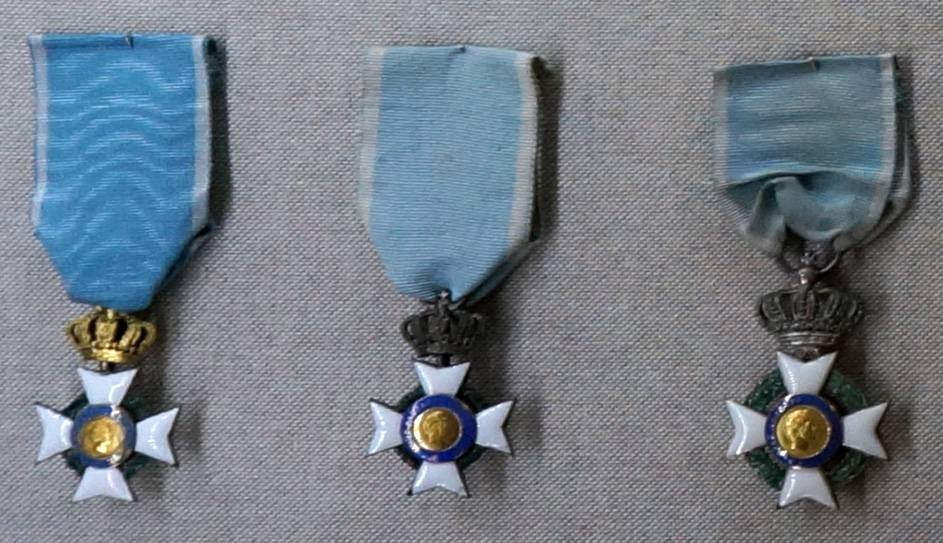
Decorations of the Order of the Redeemer, from the museum's orders collection

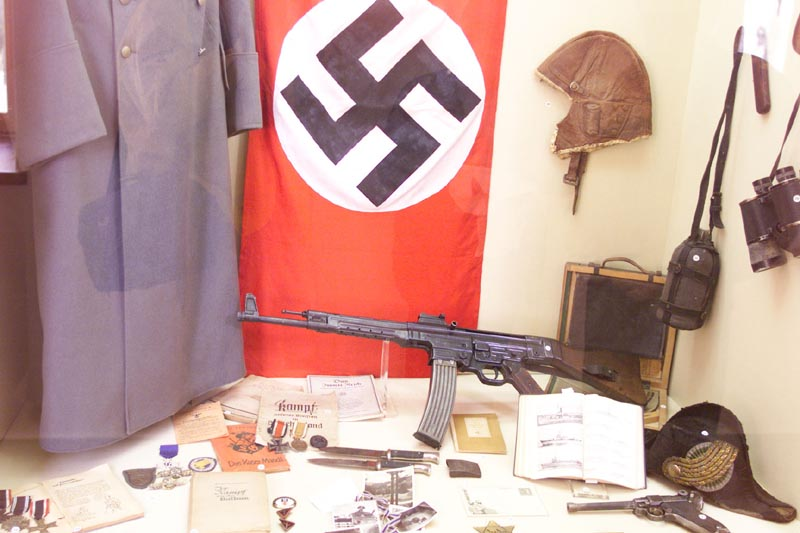
Artifacts from the collection of Nikolaos Nikoltsos

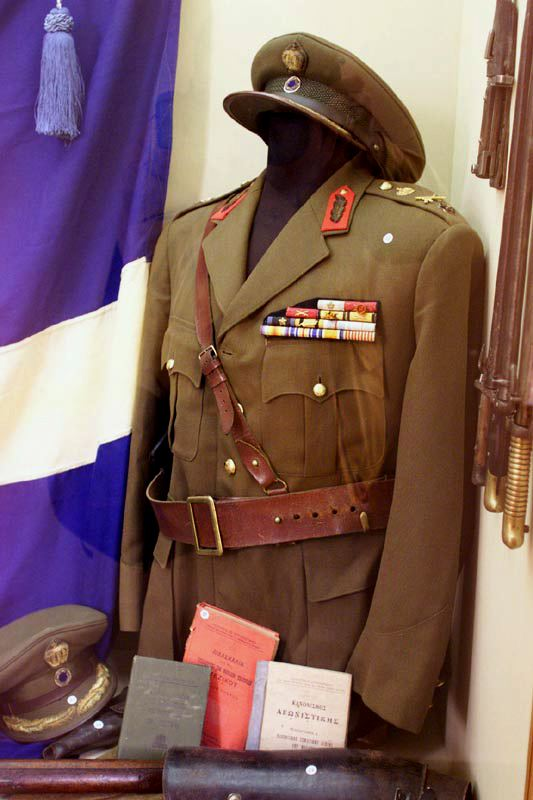
Artifacts from the collection of Vasilios Nikoltsos

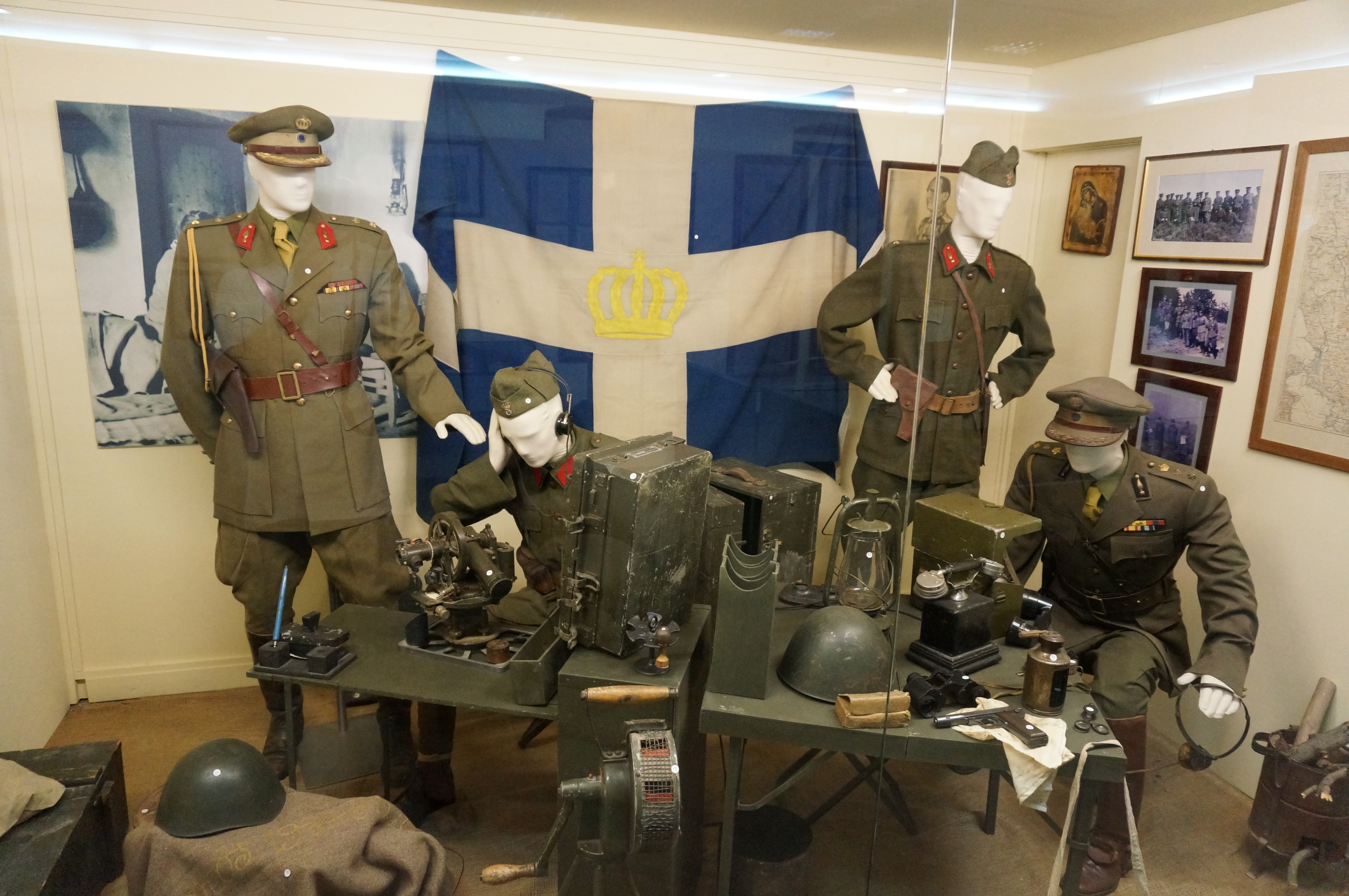
Uniforms of WWII

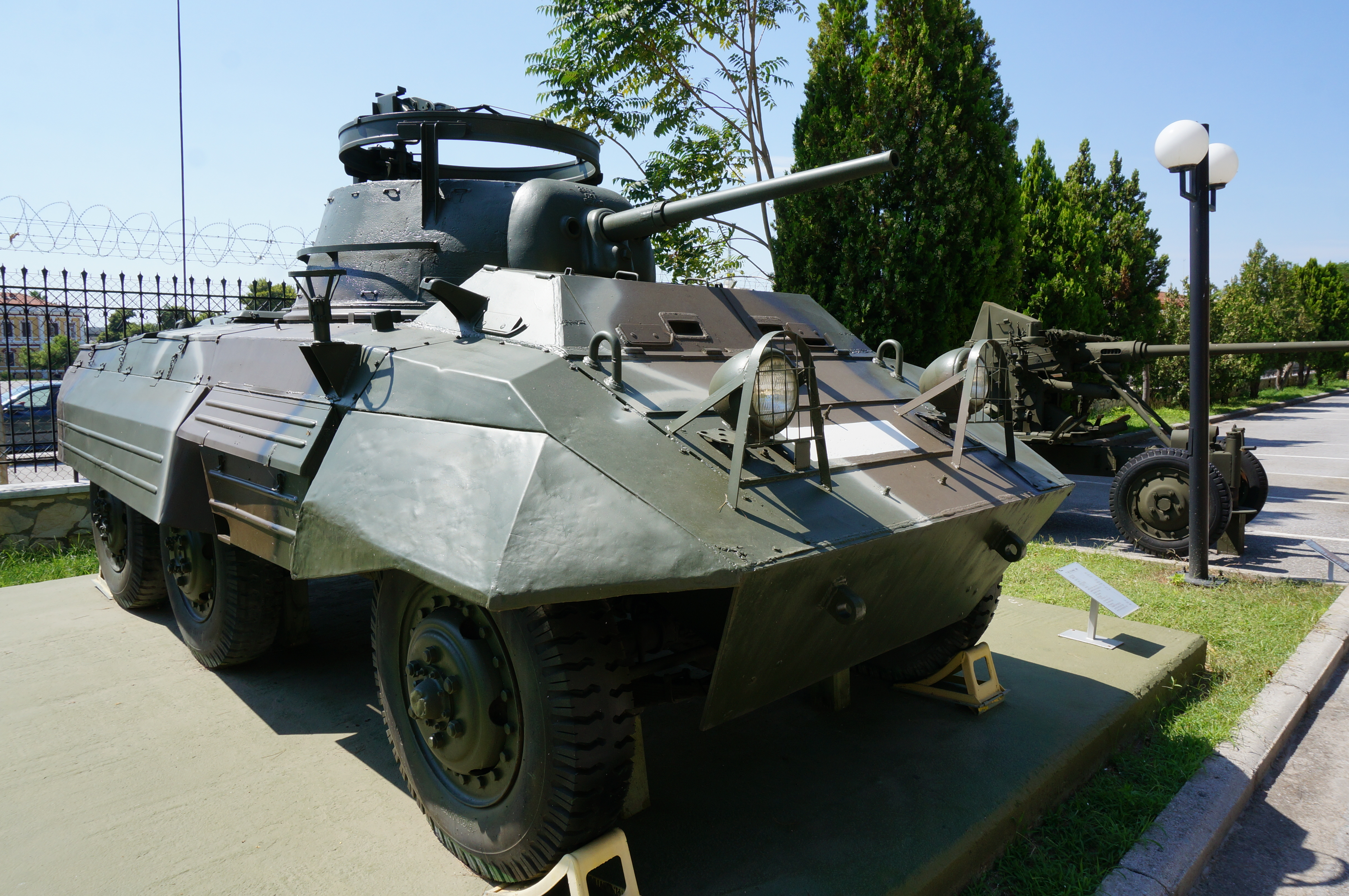
Preserved tank

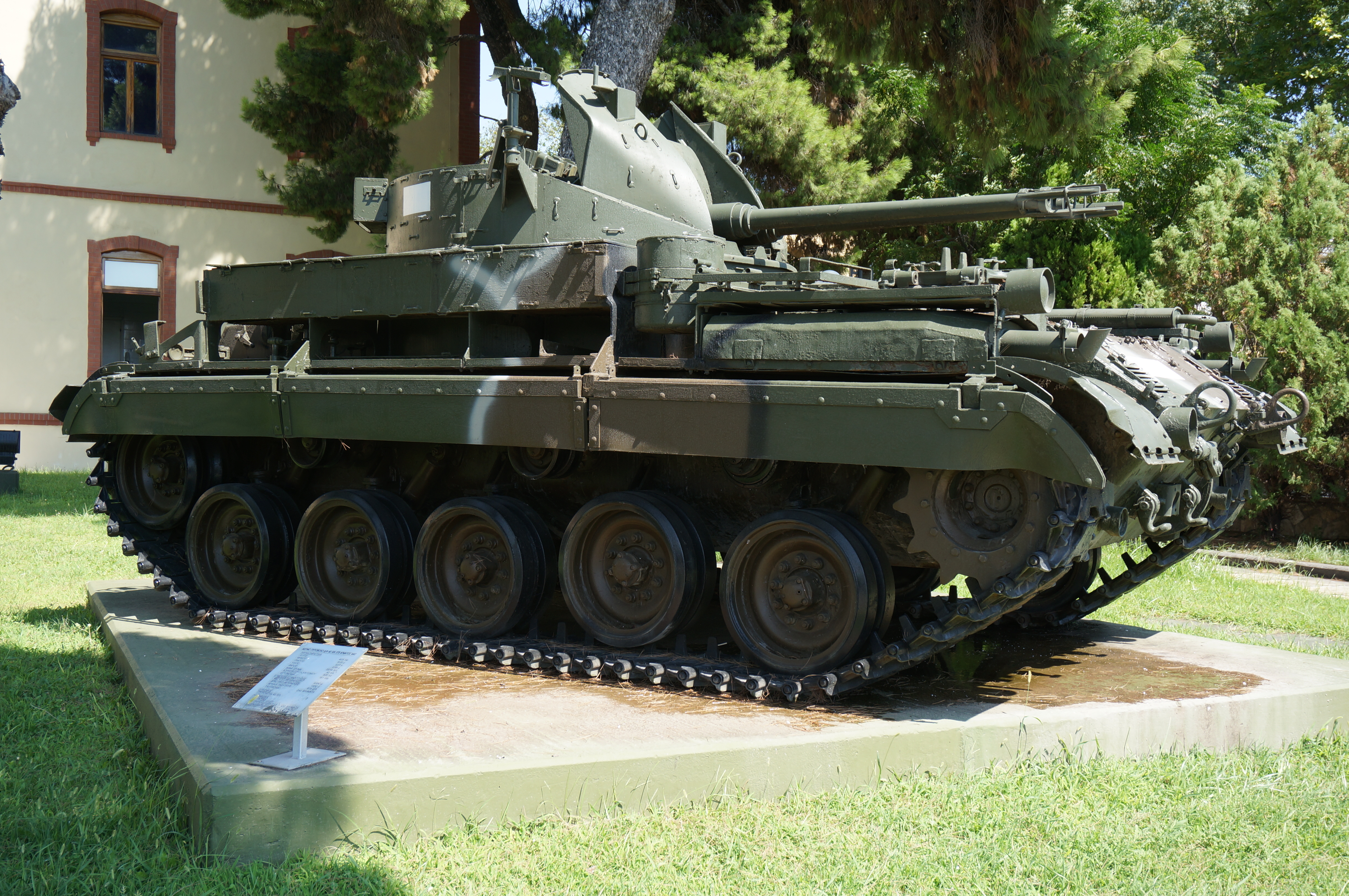
Preserved tank

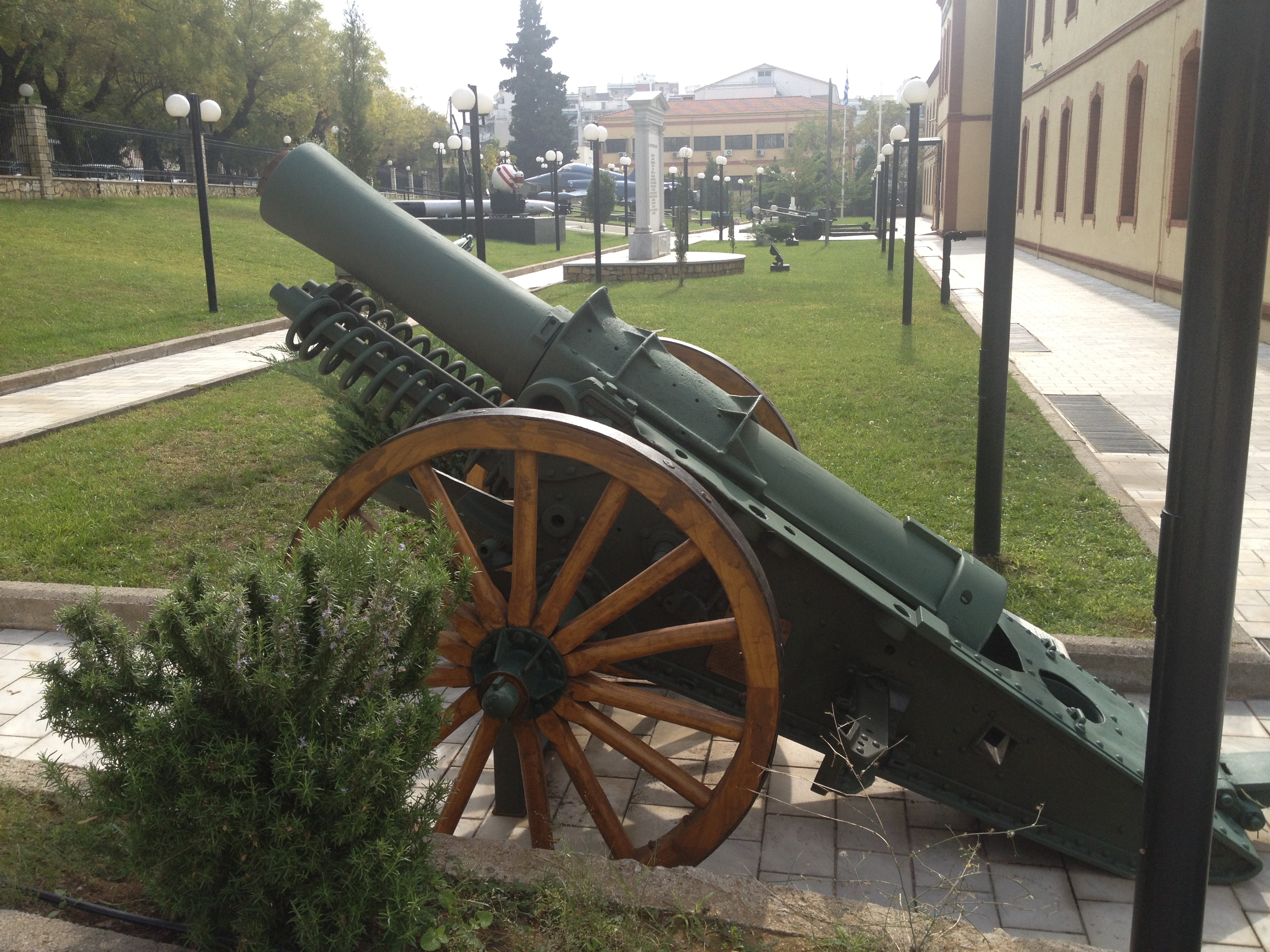
BL 6-inch 30 cwt howitzer

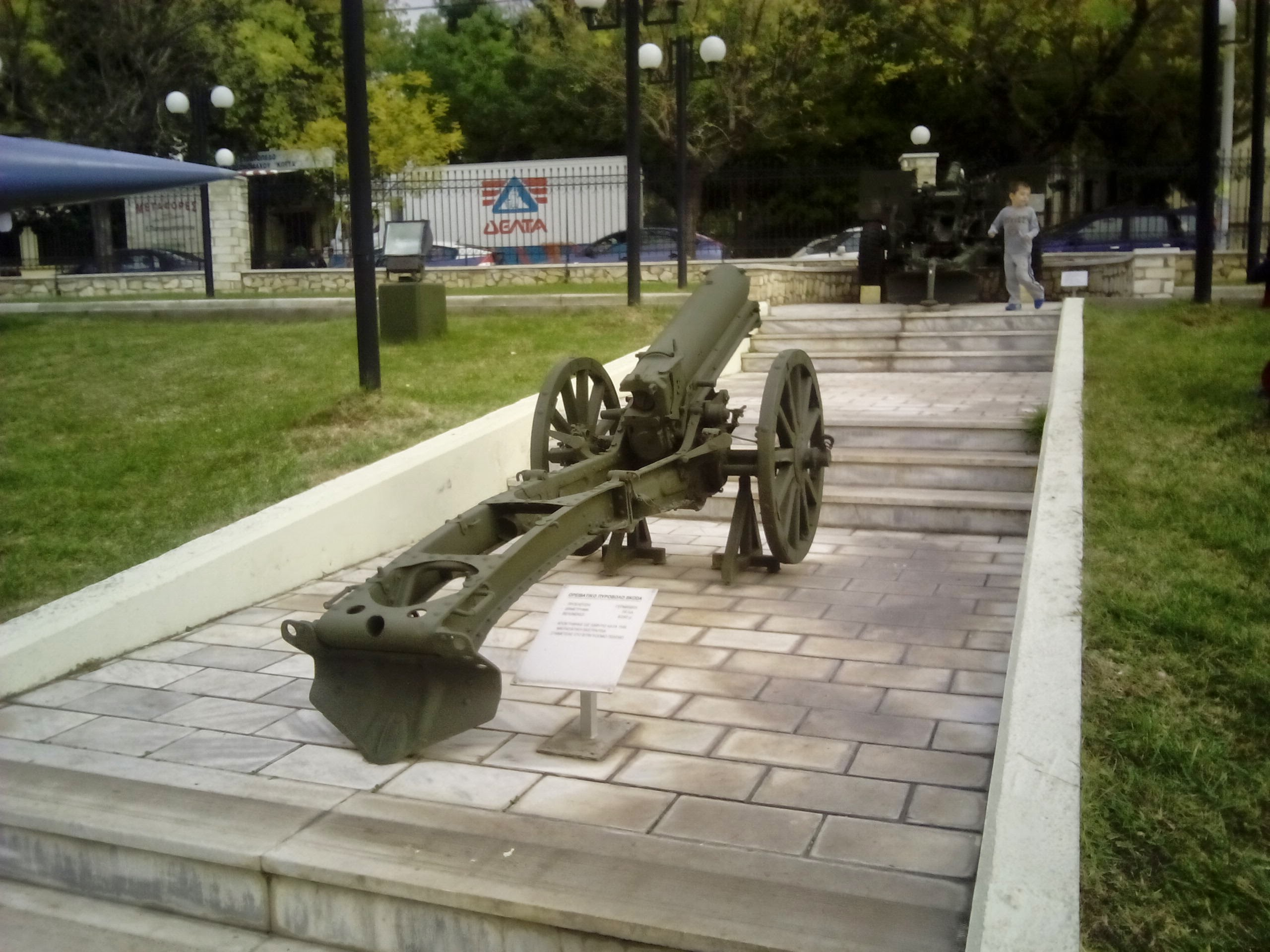
Skoda artillery gun

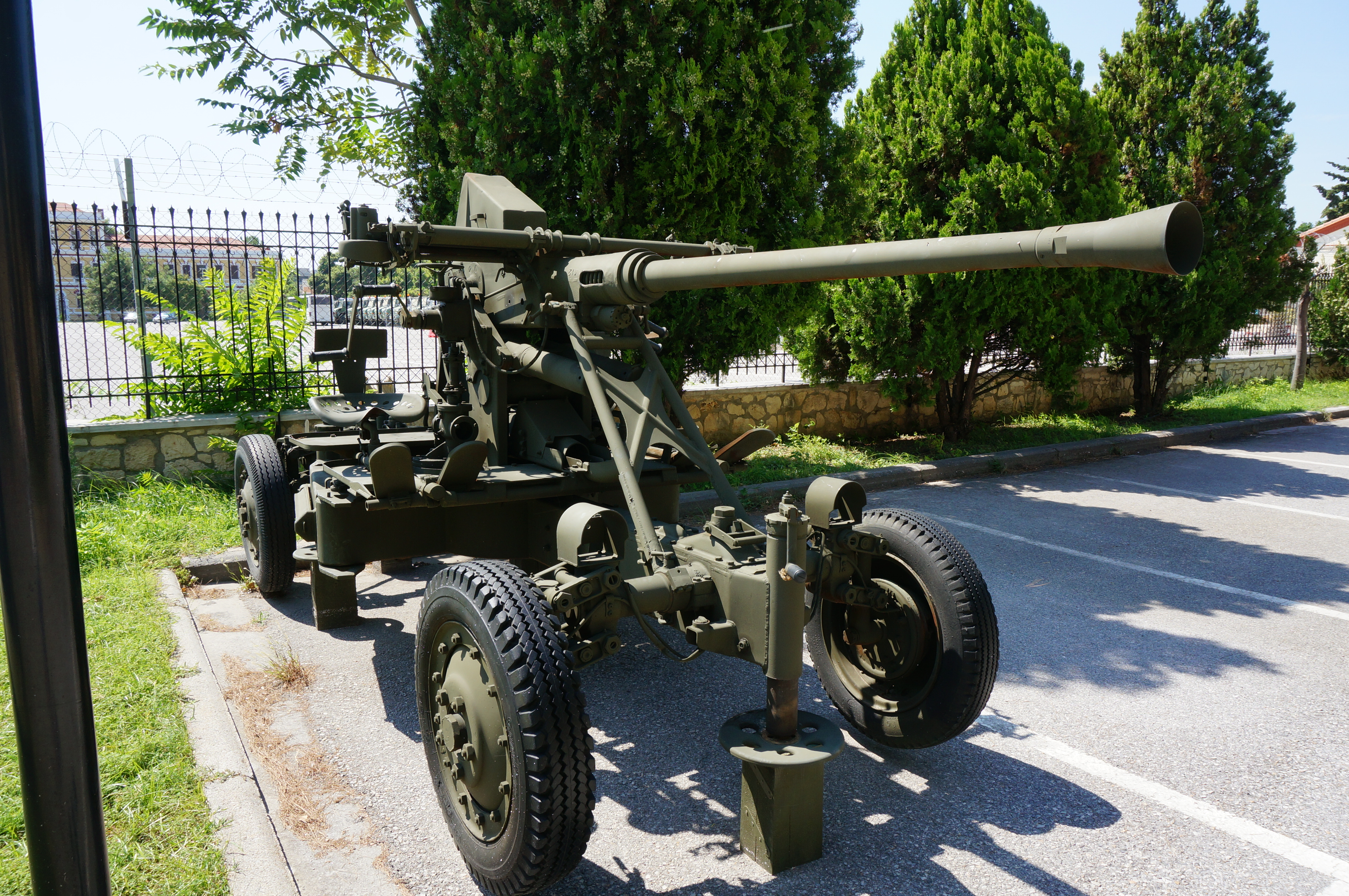
Artillery gun

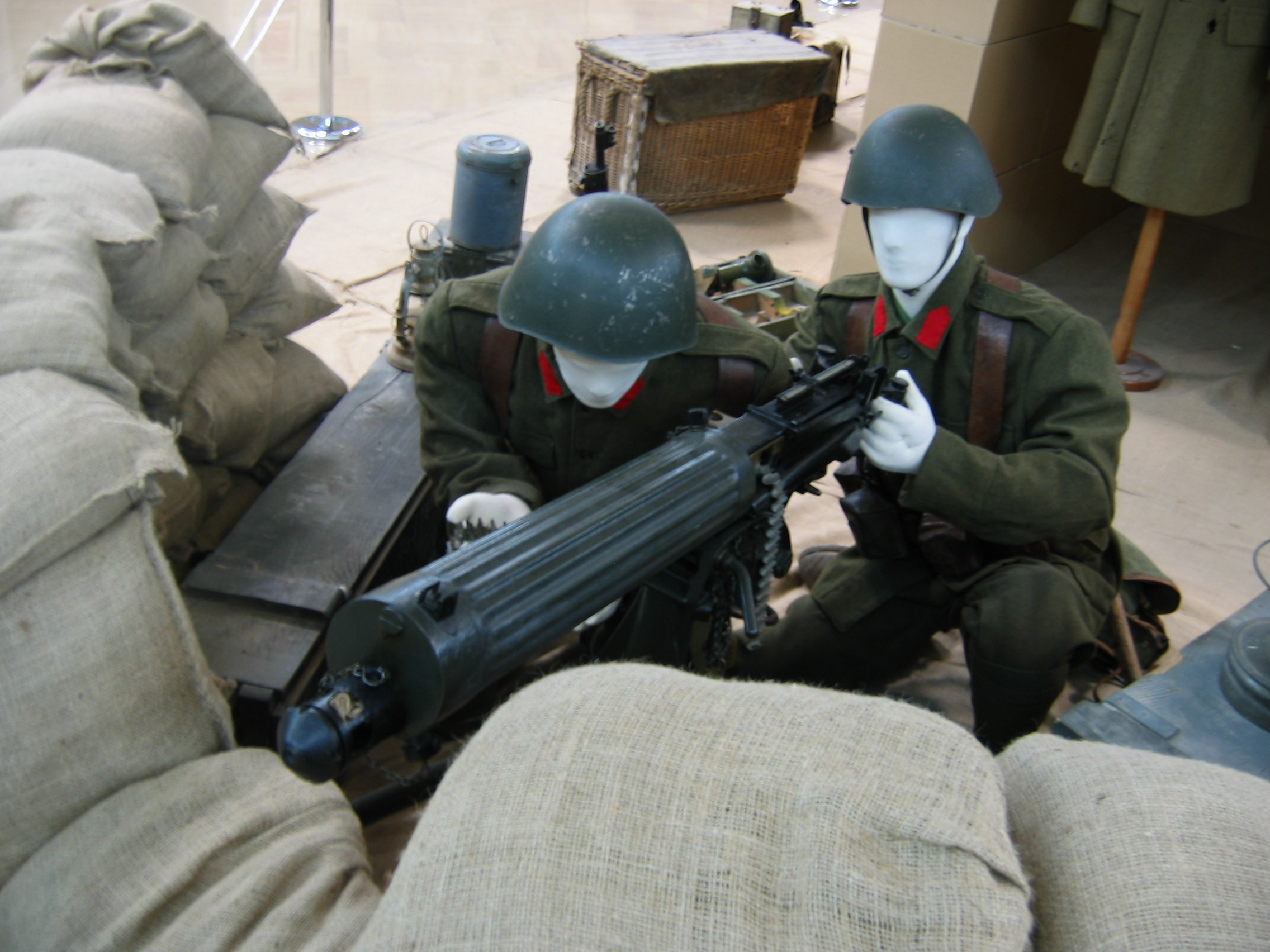
Uniforms of WWII with the Greek M1934/39 helmet

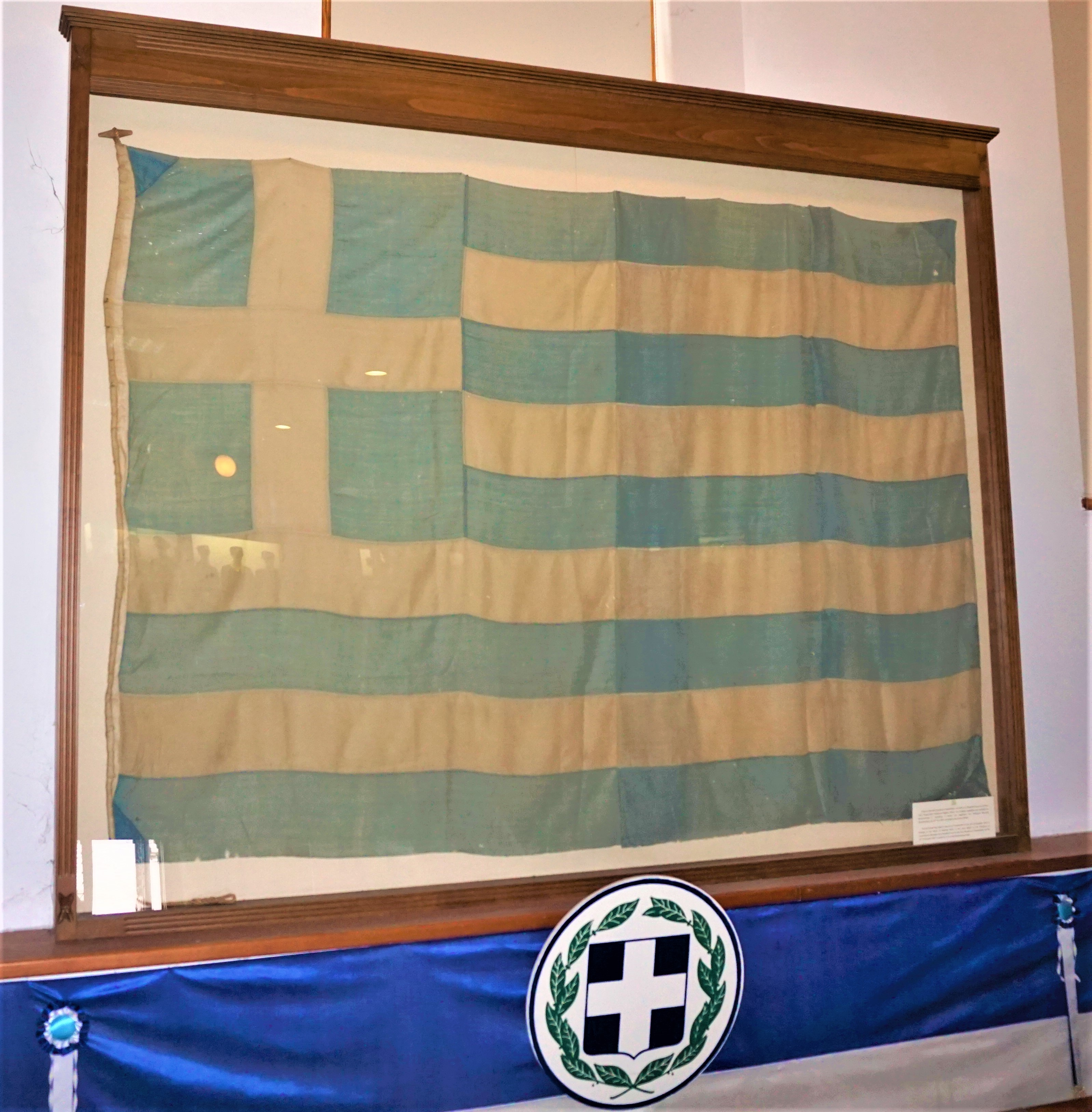
Greek flag of 1912
