= List of Cypriot artists =

The following list of Cypriot artists (in alphabetical order, by last name) includes artists of various genres, who are notable and are either born in Cyprus, of Cypriot descent, or who produce works that are primarily about Cyprus.

== A ==
- Basel Abbas (born 1983) of the duo Basel Abbas and Ruanne Abou-Rahme
- Chris Achilléos (1947–2021), Cypriot-born British fantasy painter and illustrator
- Theodore Apsevdis, Greek Cypriot icon painter in the 13th-century
- Ruzen Atakan (born 1966), Turkish-Cypriot painter

== C ==
- Mutlu Çerkez (1964–2005), British-born conceptual artist of Turkish-Cypriot heritage
- Hussein Chalayan (Hüseyin Çağlayan, born 1970), fashion designer; lived in England
- Jake and Dinos Chapman, British visual artists, previously known as the Chapman Brothers; of Cypriot heritage

== E ==
- Tracey Emin (born 1963), English contemporary artist of Turkish-Cypriot heritage
- Haris Epaminonda (born 1980), photographer and painter; lives in Berlin

== H ==
- Xanthos Hadjisoteriou (1920–2003), Greek Cypriot painter and interior designer
- Mustafa Hulusi (born 1971), British painters, video artists, installation artists, and photographer of Turkish-Cypriot heritage

== I ==
- Yiota Ioannidou (born 1971), sculptor

== K ==
- Panayiotis Kalorkoti (born 1957), Cypriot-born British painter
- Telemachos Kanthos (1910–1993), Greek Cypriot painter
- Yorgos Kypris (born 1954), Greek Cypriot sculptor
- Giovanni Kyprios, Greek Cypriot painter of the 17th century

== L ==
- Lia Lapithi (born 1963), Greek Cypriot artist specializing in multimedia
- Marios Loizides (1928–1988), Greek Cypriot painter, printmaker, and costume designer; he also lived in the UK and in Greece

== M ==
- Niki Marangou (1948–2013), Greek Cypriot painter, author, and poet

== N ==
- Loukia Nicolaidou (1909–1994), painter, and the first Cypriot woman to study art abroad
- Nicos Nicolaides (1884–1956), Greek Cypriot painter and writer

== P ==
- Christodoulos Panayiotou (born 1978), multimedia artist
- Margaret Paraskos (born 1959), English-born Cypriot painter and educator
- Stass Paraskos (1933–2014), Cypriot-born English painter and educator

== S ==
- Stelarc (born 1946; né Stelios Arcadiou), Cyprus-born Australian performance artist
- Kallinikos Stavrovouniotis (1920–2011), icon painter
- Katy Stephanides (1925–2012), painter, leader within the Cypriot modernist movement

== V ==
- Stelios Votsis (1929–2012), painter and drawer

== See also ==
- List of Cypriot Americans
- List of Cypriot painters
- List of Cypriot women artists
- Cypriot art
