= Georgios =

Georgios (Γεώργιος, Geōrgios, Modern Greek: [ʝeˈorʝios] Ancient Greek: [geɔ́ːrgios]) is a Greek male given name derived from the word georgos (γεωργός, georgós, "farmer" lit. "earth-worker"). The word georgos (γεωργός, georgós) is a compound of ge (γῆ, ge, "earth", "soil") and ergon (ἔργον, érgon, "task", "undertaking", "work").

It is one of the most usual male given names in Greece and Cyprus. The name day is 23 April (St George's Day).

The English form of the name is George, the Latinized form is Georgius. It was rarely given in England before the accession of George I of Great Britain in 1714. The Greek name is usually anglicized as George. For example, the name of Georgios Kuprios is anglicized as George of Cyprus, and latinized as Georgius Cyprius; similarly George Hamartolos (d. 867), George Maniakes (d. 1043), George Palaiologos (d 1118).

In the case of modern Greek individuals, the spelling Georgios may be retained, e.g. Georgios Christakis-Zografos (1863–1920), Georgios Stanotas (1888–1965), Georgios Grivas (1897–1974), Georgios Alogoskoufis (born 1955), Georgios Alexopoulos (born 1977), etc.

The modern Greek short form Γιώργος Giorgos is sometimes rendered Yiorgos or Yorgos, as in Yiorgos Theotokas (1906–1966), and Yorgos Lanthimos (born 1973).

Notable people with the name include:

- Georgios Abaris (born 1982), Greek footballer
- Georgios Achilleos (born 1980), Cypriot sport shooter
- Georgios Afroudakis (born 1976), Greek water polo player
- Georgios Afthonidis (1789–1867), Member of the Greek organization the Society of Friends
- Georgios Agiotis (born 1999), Greek footballer
- Georgios Agorogiannis (born 1966), Greek footballer
- Georgios Agrimanakis (born 1949), Greek boxer
- Georgios Alexopoulos (born 1977), Greek footballer and manager
- Georgios Aliprantis (1880–1943), Greek gymnast
- Georgios Alogoskoufis (born 1955), Greek academic and politician
- Georgios Amanatidis (born 1970), Greek footballer
- Georgios Amerikanos (1942–2013), Greek basketball player
- Georgios Anastassopoulos (1935–2019), Greek politician
- Georgios Anatolakis (born in 1974), Greek footballer
- Georgios Andrianopoulos (1903–1980), Greek footballer
- Georgios Angonas (born 2003), Cypriot artistic gymnast
- Georgios Anitsas (born 1891), Greek sports shooter
- Georgios Antzoulas (born 2000), Greek footballer
- Georgios Apostolidis (born 1984), Greek professional basketball player
- Georgios Apostolidis (footballer) (born in 1995), Greek footballer
- Georgios Aresti, Cypriot professional football player
- Georgios Argiropoulos (born 1970), Greek racewalker
- Georgios Aspiotis (1801–1901), Greek cyclist
- Georgios Athanasiadis-Novas (1893–1987), Greek poet, lawyer and politician
- Georgios Athanasiadis (footballer, born 1993), Greek footballer
- Georgios Athanasiadis (wrestler) (born 1962), Greek wrestler
- Georgios Athanasiadis (footballer, born 1963), Greek footballer
- Georgios Avlonitis, Greek Air Force officer
- Georgios Azoidis (born 1993), Greek judoka
- Georgios Babiniotis (born 1939), Greek linguist and philologist
- Georgios Bakatselos (1906–1992), Greek politician
- Georgios Bakos (1892–1945), Greek soldier and officer
- Georgios Balanos (1944–2020), Greek translator, author, publisher and researcher
- Georgios Balarjishvili (born 2002), Cypriot judoka
- Georgios Balatsinos, Greek conductor
- Georgios Ballas (born 2001), Greek footballer
- Georgios Balogiannis (born 1971), Greek basketball player
- Georgios Banikas (1888–1956), Greek pole vaulter
- Georgios Bantis (born 1985), Greek footballer
- Georgios Barkoglou (born 1978), Greek footballer
- Georgios Bartzokas (born 1965), Greek professional basketball player and coach
- Georgios Benos (born 1964), Greek footballer
- Georgios Birmbilis (1945–2021), Greek hurdler
- Georgios Bletsas (born 1995), Greek footballer
- Georgios Bogris (born 1989), Greek basketball player
- Georgios Bonanos (1863–1939), Greek sculptor
- Georgios Bouglas (born 1990), Greek cyclist
- Georgios Bountopoulos (born 1990), Greek footballer
- Georgios Boustras (born 1973), Greek scientist
- Georgios Boustronios (1430–1510), Cypriot chronicler (15th century)
- Georgios Boutris (born 1995), Greek basketball player
- Georgios Bouzoukis (born 1993), Greek footballer
- Georgios Charalampoglou (born 2004), Greek footballer
- Georgios Chatzaras (born 1953), Greek footballer and manager
- Georgios Chatziandreou (born 1899), Greek footballer
- Georgios Chatzizisis (born 1978), Greek footballer
- Georgios Cheimonetos (born 1972), Greek cyclist
- Georgios Chionidis (born 1991), Greek footballer
- Georgios Chortatzis (1545–1610), 16th century Greek dramatist
- Georgios Christakis-Zografos (1863–1920), Greek politician and only president of Northern Epirus
- Georgios Christodoulis (born 2001), Greek footballer
- Georgios Christodoulou (footballer, born 1997) (born 1997), Cypriot footballer
- Georgios Christodoulou (born 1965), Cypriot footballer
- Georgios Christodoulou (footballer, born 1967) (born 1967), Greek footballer
- Georgios Dritsakos (1960–2026), Greek Lieutenant General of the Hellenic Air Force
- Georgios Kleopas (born 1940), 3-time Cypriot Chess Championship winner

== See also ==
- Georgio (disambiguation)
- Giorgos
