= Giorgos =

Giorgos, Yiorgos or Yorgos (Greek: Γιώργος, romanized: Giórgos) is a common abbreviation of the given name Georgios. Notable people with the name include:

== Persons ==
=== Giorgos ===
- Giorgos Aftias, Greek journalist and politician
- Georgios Agorogiannis, Greek footballer
- Giorgos Alkaios, pop musician and singer
- Giorgos Anatolakis, Greek footballer
- Giorgos Angelopoulos, Greek businessman and billionaire
- Giorgos Apostolidis, Greek basketball player
- Giorgos Arvanitis (born 1941), Greek cinematographer
- Giorgos Balogiannis, Greek basketball player
- Giorgos Bartzokas, Greek basketball coach
- Giorgos Batis, Greek rebetiko musician
- Giorgos Dedes, Greek footballer
- Giorgos Diamantopoulos, Greek basketball player
- Giorgos Dimitrakopoulos (born 1952), Greek politician and Member of the European Parliament
- Georgios Donis, Greek footballer
- Giorgos Economides, Cypriot footballer
- Giorgos Foiros, Greek footballer and manager
- Giorgos Fotakis, Greek footballer
- Giorgos Gasparis, Greek basketball player
- Giorgos Gavriilidis (1906–1982), Greek actor
- Giorgos Gavrilos (born 1969), Greek politician
- Giorgos Georgiadis, Greek footballer
- Giorgos Giannias (died 1821), Greek revolutionary leader
- Giorgos Gonios (1946–2026), Greek footballer
- Giorgos Iacovou, Cypriot diplomat and politician
- Giorgos Kalaitzis, Greek basketball player
- Giorgos Kapoutzidis, Greek scriptwriter and actor
- Giorgos Karagounis, Greek footballer
- Giorgos Karagoutis, Greek basketball player
- Giorgos Kastrinakis, Greek-American basketball player
- Giorgos Katsaros (born 1934), Greek musician and composer
- Giorgos Kolokithas, Greek basketball player
- Giorgos Koltzos, Greek footballer
- Giorgos Konstadinou (born 1934), Greek actor and director
- Giorgos Kostikos, Greek footballer
- Giorgos Koudas, Greek footballer
- Giorgos Kyriakakis (born 1967), Greek musician
- Giorgos Markopoulos, Greek poet
- Giorgos Mazonakis, Greek pop singer
- Giorgos Merkis, Cypriot footballer
- Giorgos Mitsibonas, Greek footballer
- Giorgos Nicolaou, Cypriot footballer
- Giorgos Ninios, Greek actor
- Giorgos Paligiorgos, Greek footballer
- Giorgos Panagi, Cypriot footballer
- Giorgos Papasideris (1902–1977), Greek country singer, composer and lyricist
- Giorgos Patis, Greek badminton player
- Giorgos Pelagias, Cypriot footballer
- Giorgos Poniros, Greek footballer
- Giorgos Samaras, Greek footballer
- Giorgos Savvidis, Greek footballer
- Giorgos Seferis (1900–1971), Greek writer, Nobel Prize in Literature laureate
- Giorgos Siantos, Greek resistance member and politician
- Giorgos Sideris, Greek footballer
- Giorgos Sigalas, Greek basketball player
- Giorgos Skartados, Greek footballer
- Giorgos Stamatis, Greek politician
- Giorgos Sterianopoulos, Greek businessman
- Giorgos Theodoridis, Greek footballer
- Giorgos Theodotou, Greek footballer
- Giorgos Theofanous (born 1968), Cypriot-Greek composer
- Giorgos Tofas, Cypriot footballer
- Giorgos Toursounidis, Greek footballer
- Giorgos Toussas, Greek politician and Member of the European Parliament
- Giorgos Tsalikis, Greek pop singer
- Giorgos Tsiaras, Greek basketball player
- Giorgos Tzavelas, Greek footballer
- Giorgos Tzavellas, Greek film director and screenwriter
- Giorgos Vaitsis, Greek footballer
- Giorgos Vassilakopoulos, President of FIBA Europe
- Giorgos Velentzas, Greek actor
- Giorgos Zampetas, Greek songwriter and musician

=== Yiorgos ===
- Yiorgos Batis (1885–1967), Greek musician, influential in rebetiko music
- Yiorgos Caralambo, camel driver hired by US Army in 1856 for the Camel Corps experiment in the Southwest
- Yiorgos Depollas, Greek photographer
- Yiorgos Magoulas, Greek composer and guitarist
- Yiorgos Vardinogiannis, Greek shipowner and businessman, former owner and president of the Panathinaikos football club

=== Yorgos ===
- Yorgos Avgeropoulos (born 1971), Greek journalist and documentary filmmaker
- Yorgos Dalaras, Greek Singer
- Yorgos Foudoulis (born 1964), Greek classical guitarist and composer
- Yorgos Kypris (born 1954), Cypriot sculptor
- Yorgos Lanthimos (born 1973), Greek filmmaker and theatre director
- Yorgos Mavropsaridis, Greek film editor
- Yorgos Vrasivanopoulos (1924–1998), Greek actor

== Songs about Giorgos ==
- "Giorgo pou xereis ta polla" (Giorgos, the know-it-all) by Dimitris Mitropanos
- "Me lene Giorgo" (My name is Giorgos) sung by Manolis Mitsias, written by Giorgos Hatzinasios
- "Aftos o Giorgos" (This Giorgos) by Giorgos Marinos

== See also ==
- George (given name)
