= List of painters from Cyprus =

This is a list of notable painters from, or associated with, Cyprus.

== A ==
- Ruzen Atakan (born 1966)

== G ==
- İsmet Güney (1932–2009)

== H ==
- Xanthos Hadjisoteriou (1920–2003)
- Mustafa Hulusi (born 1971)

== K ==
- Telemachos Kanthos (1910–1993)

== L ==
- Marios Loizides (1928–1988)

== M ==
- Niki Marangou (1948–2013)

== N ==
- Nicos Nicolaides (1884–1956)

== P ==
- Stass Paraskos (1933–2014)

== V ==
- Stelios Votsis (1929–2012)

== See also ==
- List of Cypriot artists
- List of Cypriot women artists
