= List of Cypriot women artists =

This is a list of women artists who were born in Cypriot or whose artworks are closely associated with that country.

== E ==
- Tracey Emin (born 1963), English contemporary artist of Turkish-Cypriot heritage

== L ==
- Lia Lapithi (born 1963), Greek Cypriot artist specializing in multimedia

== M ==
- Niki Marangou (1948–2013), Greek Cypriot painter, author, and poet

== N ==
- Loukia Nicolaidou (1909–1994), painter, first Cypriot woman to study art abroad

== P ==
- Margaret Paraskos (born 1959), English-born Cypriot painter and educator

== S ==
- Katy Stephanides (1925–2012), painter, leader within the Cypriot modernist movement

== See also ==
- Cypriot art
- List of Cypriot artists
- List of Cypriot painters
