= Magoulas =

Magoulas (Greek: Μαγουλάς) is a Greek surname. Notable people with the surname include:

- Thimistokles Magoulas (born 1927), Greek sailor
- Yiorgos Magoulas (born 1970), Greek composer, conductor, and guitarist
