= Ioannis Giangos =

Greek Air Force officer

Air Chief Marshal Ioannis Giangos
- Ιωάννης Γιάγκος
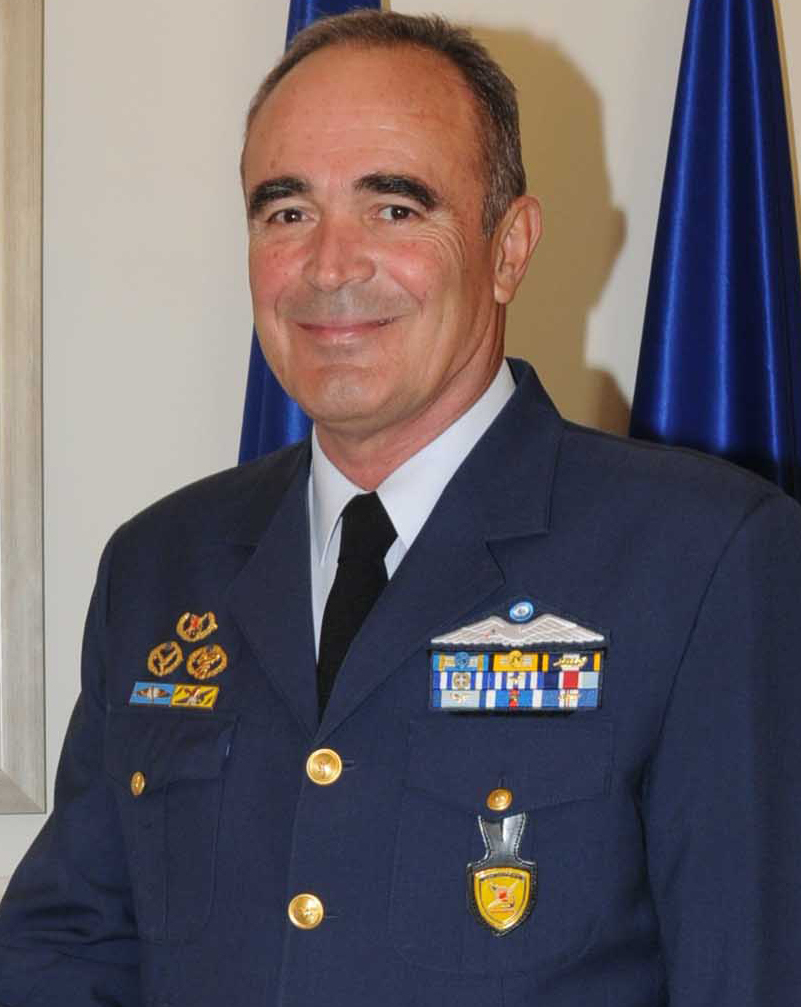
- Air Chief Marshal Giangos in 2009

Minister for National Defence
- In office 28 August 2015 – 23 September 2015
- Prime Minister: Vassiliki Thanou-Christophilou
- Preceded by: Panos Kammenos
- Succeeded by: Panos Kammenos

Personal details
- Born: 1951 (age 74–75) Trikala, Thessaly, Greece
- Party: Independent
- Children: 3
- Education: Hellenic Air Force Academy

Military service
- Allegiance: Greece
- Branch: Hellenic Air Force
- Years: 1974–2011
- Rank: Air Chief Marshal
- Commands: Chief of National Defense General Staff; Chief of Air Force General Staff; Commander of CAOC-7

Air Chief Marshal Ioannis Giangos (Greek: Ιωάννης Γιάγκος; born 1951) is a retired Greek Air Force officer and a former Chief of the National Defense General Staff of Greece. He served as an interim Minister for National Defence in the Caretaker Cabinet of Vassiliki Thanou-Christophilou.

== Career ==
Ioannis Giangos was born in December 1951 in Trikala, Thessaly. He attended the Greek Air Force Academy and graduated in 1974 as a pilot officer. His initial assignment was in the 117 Combat Wing stationed at Andravida Air force Base, as an F-4 Phantom II aircraft pilot. During his career as a command pilot he served as fighter squadron and tactical fighter wing commander in several units of the Greek Air Force, with more than 4,200 flying hours in a variety of aircraft, 3,000 of which in F-4 and F-16 C/D fighter jets. He is an alumnus of various military schools both in Greece and abroad. Air Chief Marshal Giangos served as Staff Officer in the plans and policy branch at the Supreme Headquarters Allied Powers Europe (SHAPE) in Mons, Belgium and as Commander of the NATO Combined Air Operations Centre-7, in Larissa, Greece.

From January 2007 to August 2009, as Air Marshal, Giangos held the post of Chief of the Hellenic Air Force General Staff. During this period the fighter aircraft fleet of the Greek Air Force was increased to 170, as result of the 'Peace Xenia IV' purchase program from Lockheed Martin of 30 additional F-16 Block 52+ aircraft.

On August 6, 2009, following a decision of the Government Council for Foreign Affairs and Defense (KYSEA), he was nominated for appointment to the rank of Air Chief Marshal and the office of the Chief of National Defense General Staff. In September 2009, during discussions with Supreme Allied Commander Europe, U.S. Admiral James Stavridis, Giangos outlined the country's positions concerning participation of Greece in NATO peace-keeping missions as well as the present situation of the Aegean dispute. He held the post until his retirement, on 3 November 2011.

Giangos was appointed the interim Minister for National Defence in the Caretaker Cabinet of Vassiliki Thanou-Christophilou on 28 August 2015. He served until the legislative election on 20 September.

== Military awards ==
- Medal of Military Merit 1st Class
- Outstanding Command Commendation Medal 1st Class
- Grand Cross of the Order of the Phoenix
- Grand Commander of the Order of Honour
- Staff Officer Commendation Medal 1st Class
- Formation – Major Unit Command Commendation Medal 1st Class
- General Staff Command Commendation Medal
- Star of Merit and Honour Commendation Medal

== Personal life ==
Giangos is married and has three children.

Military offices
Preceded by Georgios Avlonitis	Chief of the Hellenic Air Force General Staff; 23 January 2007 – 6 August 2009	Succeeded by Vasilios Klokozas
Preceded by General Dimitrios Grapsas	Chief of the Hellenic National Defense General Staff; 6 August 2009 – 3 November 2011	Succeeded by General Michail Kostarakos
