= Kyriakakis =

Kyriakakis (Greek: Κυριακάκης) is a Greek surname. Notable people with the surname include:

- Chris Kyriakakis (born 1963), Greek professor of electrical engineering, author, and inventor
- Giorgos Kyriakakis (born 1967), Greek composer
