= Dimosthenis Grigoriadis =

Chief of the Hellenic Air Force General Staff

Lieutenant General Dimosthenis Grigoriadis (Greek: Δημοσθένης Γρηγοριάδης) is Chief of the Hellenic Air Force General Staff. He assumed his duties as Chief on 12 January 2024. He enlisted in the Hellenic Air Force Academy in 1983 and graduated as a 2nd Lieutenant in 1987.

== Education ==
Grigoriadis attended the Supreme Joint War College, Water Survival School, Instructors School, and the Electronic Warfare College. He has also completed the junior officers course at the Air War College, the Test Pilots Seminar, and the Flight Supervision Seminar. Dimosthenis has also received training at the F-16 Flight Instructor School and Commanders Units Seminars. He completed the NATO Staff Officers course and the NATO Joint Aviation EW School. He also attended the Defense Language Institute and completed the Arms Control Implementation course, which focused on the Dayton Treaty. He has also completed OSCE Inspector/Escort Course, Lantirn training with an IP Upgrade at USAF Flight Training, and European Immigration Management Seminar in the Eastern Mediterranean, which was sponsored by the National and Kapodistrian University of Athens.

== Flight Experience ==
Grigoriadis has more than 4,000 flights hours, flying aircraft such as the T-41D, T-2E, T-33, F-5A/B and F-16C/D aircraft.

== Medals-Decorations ==
The Chief has been awarded a number of decorative orders such as:

- Grand Commander of the Order of Honor
- Grand Commander of the Order of the Phoenix
- Medal of Military Merit (1st class)

Other Decorations include: Commendation Medal Cross of Merit and Honor, Commendation Medal Chief of General Staff, Air Force Meritorious Command Medal 1st Class, Air Force Formation Command Medal 2nd Class,Staff Officer Service Commendation Medal 2nd Class
