= Avgeropoulos =

Avgeropoulos is a surname. Notable people with the surname include:

- Marie Avgeropoulos (born 1986), Canadian-Greek actress and model
- Yorgos Avgeropoulos (born 1971), Greek journalist and documentary filmmaker
