= Giorgio =

Giorgio may refer to:

== People ==
- Giorgio (name), an Italian given name and surname

== Places ==
- Castel Giorgio, comune in Umbria, Italy

== Other ==
- Giorgio (album), an album by Giorgio Moroder
- "Giorgio" (song), a song by Lys Assia
- Giorgio Beverly Hills, a prestige fragrance brand
- "Giorgio by Moroder", a song by Daft Punk featuring a monologue by Giorgio Moroder

== See also ==
- Georgio (disambiguation)
- Georgios
- San Giorgio (disambiguation)
