= Avlonitis =

Avlonitis is a surname. Notable people with the surname include:

- Anastasios Avlonitis, Greek professional footballer
- Vasilis Avlonitis (1904–1970), Greek comedian
- Alexandros Avlonitis, Greek politician
- Georgios Avlonitis, Greek Air Force officer
