= Balanos =

Balanos is both a given name and surname. Notable people with the name include:

- Balanos Vasilopoulos (1694–1760), Greek cleric, author, mathematician, physicist, and philosopher
- Georgios Balanos (1944–2020), Greek author, publisher, and translator
- Nikolaos Balanos (1869–1943), Greek architect

For the Egyptian perfume component, see Moringa peregrina.
