= Maria Laina =

Greek poet (1947–2023)

- Born: 1947; Patras, Greece
- Died: 27 December 2023 (aged 76); Athens, Greece
- Occupations: Poet, translator, critic
- Writing career
- Period: 1968–2003

Maria Laina (Greek: Μαρία Λαϊνά; 1947 – 27 December 2023) was a Greek poet. She studied Law at the University of Athens, but she did not practice it, and worked instead as a translator, critic, screenwriter, copy editor, professor of Greek, and radio producer.

Laina belonged to the so-called Genia tou '70 (i.e. '70's Generation), which is a literary term referring to Greek authors who began publishing their work during the 1970s, especially towards the end of the Greek military junta of 1967–1974 and at the first years of the Metapolitefsi.

Laina was awarded the State Prize for Poetry for her collection Rodinos Fovos (Ρόδινος φόβος) in 1993, and the Cavafy Prize together with Giorgos Markopoulos in 1996. Her poetry has been translated into English, French, and Spanish.

Maria Laina died on 27 December 2023, at the age of 76.

== Selected works ==
=== Poetry ===
- Ενηλικίωση (Coming of Age), 1968
- Επέκεινα (Hereafter), 1970
- Αλλαγή τοπίου (A Change of Landscape), 1972
- Σημεία στίξεως (Punctuation Marks), 1979
- Δικό της (Of her own), 1985
- Ρόδινος φόβος (Rose fear), 1992 and in English translated by Sarah McCann
- Εδώ (Here), 2003

=== Translations ===
- Pound, Ezra, Η Αλφαβήτα της μελέτης (ABC of Reading), 1974
- Mansfield, Katherine, Μακαριότητα (Bliss), 1981
- Eliot, T. S., Για την ποίηση (On Poetry and Poets), 1982
