= Stephanides =

Stephanides or Stefanides is a Greek surname. It is a patronymic surname which literally means "the son of Stephanos", equivalent to English Stephenson.

Notable people with the surname include:

- Katy Stephanides
- Stephanos Stephanides (born 1951), Cypriot author, poet, translator and critic
- Theodore Stephanides (1896–1983), Greek-British poet, author, translator, doctor, naturalist and scientist
- Neofitos Stefanides (1975–present), Orthopedic surgeon in New York
