= Georgio =

Georgio is a variant of George.

It may refer to:

== Mononyms ==
- Georgio (singer) (born 1966), full name Georgio Alentini, born George Allen. American singer, songwriter, and musician
- Georgio (rapper) (born 1993), birth name Georges Édouard Nicolo, French rapper and singer of Gudeloupean origin

== First name / Given name ==
- Georgio Georgiades, from cast of TV series The Only Way Is Essex
- Georgio Poullas (born 1998), American wrestler
- Georgio Psychoundakis (1920–2006), Greek Resistance fighter on Crete during the Second World War)

== See also ==
- George (name)
- Georgios
- Giorgio (disambiguation)
