= Alona, Cyprus =

Alona: Άλωνα (Greek); Alona (Turkish)
- Village
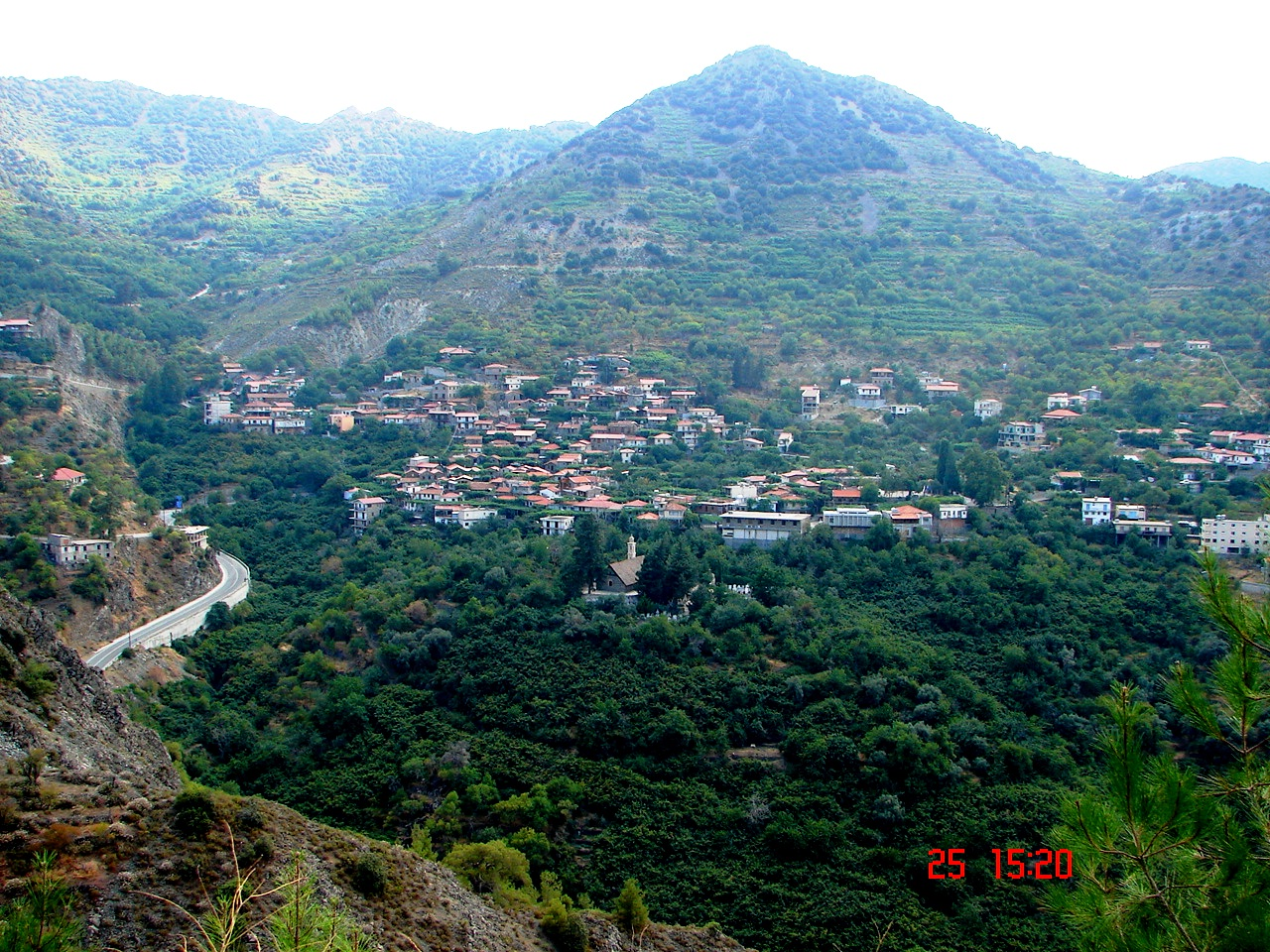

- Location in Cyprus
- Coordinates: 34°55′58″N 33°2′24″E
- Country: Cyprus
- District: Nicosia District

Population (2001)
  - Total: 128
- Time zone: UTC+2 (EET)
  - Summer (DST): UTC+3 (EEST)

Alona (Greek: Άλωνα; Turkish: Alona) is a village in the Nicosia District of Cyprus. It located on the north side of the Troodos mountain range, between the Madari and Papoutsa peaks, at an altitude of 1200 meters.

== History ==
The population of Alona, and surrounding villages of the Pitsilia locale, like Platanistassa, have traditionally been Greek-speaking and Christian. Moslem Turks did not live in the area between 1572 and 1964, although many Turks vacationed there. There have been periods of Catholic and Venetian domination, however, with the Church of Cyprus being dissolved.

== Nature and village beauty ==
The village lies in a hazel valley,and fruit is grown there for six months of the year, starting with cherries in May until the late grapes in November.

All seasons are very pronounced in the village. In winter there is snow, spring is fragrant due to the flowering of almond and fruit trees, summer is green and fresh, and autumn boasts the gold of yellowed leaves.

The central streets are paved and covered over in large part by thick vines, resembling roads through a rainforest rather than a mountainous Mediterranean village. The nature study trail "Petros Vanezis" passes through hazelnut, apple, almond and cherry trees, and receives hundreds of visitors each year.

The traditional stone houses of old neighborhoods with the paved uphill by mountain stone streets, to bring in some other nostalgic times. There are the remains of the works of a folk craftsman who left a permanent mark in the village.

== Churches ==
The village church surrounded by cherry trees and other trees was built in 1835 on the ruins of the previous that once upon delivery monastery and was destroyed by fire. Among the icons there is also St George patron of the village, work of the famous painter Kornaros of Crete. Old is the miraculous icon of the Virgin Galaktotrofousa whose fame is known not only in the region but in the whole of Cyprus and until a few years ago took refuge in the grace of women from all over the island, to have milk to suck their children. In 1998 and within the exhibition of Treasures of the Church of St. George Alon became revelation of images and below the silver investment has discovered rare picture of St. George, only known work of Simeon Protoiereos (1641) and the icon Chrysogalousas (1648).

The ancient church of Panagia Kardakiotissas restored after the fire that devastated in 1987 and returned to its original form before the renovations of the 1960s. The chapel is preserved only the ancient image of Christ after the miraculous image of the Virgin was burned.

A few years ago, local people rebuilt the chapel of St. Nicholas Symfylou near the Forest Virgin Station and 3km. From the village of Kato Moni. The chapel was built on the ruins of the old church of St. Nicholas and was inaugurated in 2008.

== Culture ==
Alona hosts an annual festival to mark the feast day of the Dormition of the Mother of God, on the 15th of August. This event involves traditional Cypriot music and food. There is also an annual Zivania festival running since 2010, which allows visitors to observe the traditional process of making Zivania, as well as taking in local foods, music and dancing.

There are two very old churches, the main one being St George, which houses an exceptional ikon of the saint. The village has a library, and a co-operative. The Cypriot modern painter Telemachos Kanthos had a house in the village and many of his oils are of the surrounding mountain scenery.
