= Safety Science =

Academic journal on human and industrial safety

- Discipline: Safety management
- Language: English
- Edited by: Georgios Boustras

Publication details
- Former name: Journal of Occupational Accidents
- History: 1976–present
- Publisher: Elsevier
- Frequency: Monthly
- Open access: Hybrid
- Impact factor: 5.4 (2023)

Standard abbreviations
- ISO 4: Saf. Sci.

Indexing
- ISSN: 0925-7535 (print); 1879-1042 (web)
- LCCN: 91640944
- OCLC no.: 670097316
- Journal of Occupational Accidents
- ISSN: 0925-7535

Links
- Journal homepage; Online archive

Safety Science is a monthly peer-reviewed scientific journal published by Elsevier covering research on all aspects of human and industrial safety. The editor-in-chief is Georgios Boustras (European University Cyprus). The journal was established in 1976 as the Journal of Occupational Accidents, with Herbert Eisner as founding editor-in-chief. In 1990, the aims and scope of the journal were expanded, and the journal obtained its current name.

== Editors-in-chief ==
Since 1990, the following persons are or have been editors-in-chief:

- 1990–2009: Andrew Hale
- 2010–2012: Kathryn Mearns
- 2013–2017: Jean-Luc Wybo
- 2018–present: Georgios Boustras

== Abstracting and indexing ==
The journal is abstracted and indexed in:

- CAB Abstracts
- Current Contents/Engineering, Computing & Technology
- EBSCO databases
- Ei Compendex
- Embase
- Inspec
- ProQuest databases
- PsycINFO
- Science Citation Index Expanded
- Scopus

According to the Journal Citation Reports, the journal has a 2023 impact factor of 5.4.
