= The Good Fruit of the Earth =

Painting by Loukia Nicolaidou

- Αγαθοί Καρποί της Γης (Greek)
- Artist: Lucia Nicolaidou-Vasiliou
- Year: 1933
- Medium: oil on canvas
- Dimensions: 188 cm × 140 cm (74 in × 55 in)
- Location: State Gallery of Contemporary Cypriot Art

The Good Fruit of the Earth is a painting created by the Cypriot painter Loukia Nicolaidou between the years 1933 - 1936.

== Description ==
The painting, oil on canvas, has dimensions of 188 cm. X 140 cm and is exhibited at the State Gallery of Contemporary Cypriot Art.

== Analysis ==
The painting was made by Lucia Nicolaidou-Vasiliou, the first woman from Cyprus to study painting abroad, particularly in France. In this canvas she demonstrates the obvious influence of Paul Gauguin as shown in the areas of the forms, the theme and the symbolism. The painting stands out for its large color surfaces and for the female figures mother and daughter, symbolizing the quest for innocence, while exuding a sense of sensuality absent from the corresponding women depicted in the works of other Cypriot artists of that period.
