= Georgios Avlonitis =

Greek Air Force officer

Air Chief Marshal Georgios Avlonitis
- Γεώργιος Αυλωνίτης
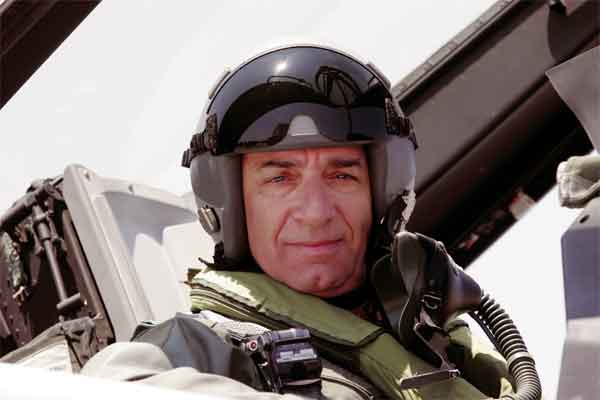

Personal details
- Born: 1950 (age 75–76) Athens, Attica, Greece
- Education: Hellenic Air Force Academy

Military service
- Allegiance: Greece
- Branch/service: Hellenic Air Force
- Years of service: 1969–2007
- Rank: Air Chief Marshal
- Commands: Chief of Air Force General Staff

Air Chief Marshal Georgios Avlonitis (Greek: Γεώργιος Αυλωνίτης; born 24 January 1950) is a retired Greek Air Force officer and former Chief of the Hellenic Air Force General Staff.

Avlonitis was born in Athens on 24 January 1950. He entered the Hellenic Air Force Academy in 1969 and graduated on 6 August 1973. He served in several command and staff positions, both in the Greek armed forces and in NATO. He served as Chief of the Air Force Training Command before being promoted to Air Marshal and assuming command of the Air Force General Staff on 13 September 2004. He served in this post for three years, retiring on 25 January 2007 with the rank of Air Chief Marshal.

== Sources ==
- CV at the official website of the Hellenic Air Force

Military offices
Preceded by Panagiotis Papanikolaou	Chief of the Hellenic Air Force General Staff; 13 September 2004 – 24 January 2007	Succeeded by Ioannis Giagkos
