= Kallinikos Stavrovouniotis =

Cypriot hagiographer (1920–2011)

- Born: Kostas P. Mammous; November 11, 1920; Athienou, Larnaca District, Cyprus
- Died: January 23, 2011 (aged 90); Stavrovouni Monastery, Cyprus
- Occupations: Monk, Icon painter, Hagiographer
- Known for: Byzantine icon painting
- Notable work: Murals in the katholikon of the Stavrovouni Monastery
- Style: Byzantine art

Father Kallinikos Stavrovouniotis (Greek: Καλλίνικος Σταυροβουνιώτης), birth name Kostas P. Mammous (Greek: Κώστας Π. Μαμμούς; 11 November 1920 – 23 January 2011), the icon painter, was an Orthodox monk, ascetic in Cyprus, and was one of the most important Byzantine icon painters of the modern age.

== Biography ==
Kallinikos Stavrovouniotis was born in 1920 in the town Athienou of the Larnaca District in Cyprus. He was the third child of the family of Petros Mammous and Florentia Gianni Liontari. In a young age (June 1941), he entered the Stavrovouni Monastery as a novice monk. Soon he became a monk and apprenticed next to the Stavrovouniote painters and mainly fathers Meletios, Dionysios and Stefanos. After blessing from the father superior Varnavas, in 1946 he leaves for Greece and Mount Athos aiming to further exercise his art. In Mount Athos, he firstly apprenticed for two months next to father Ioannikios Mavropoulos, who however died soon after they met.

Apart from Mount Athos, he also visited other Orthodox places where there was knowledge of Byzantine art, namely Mystras, Veria, Thessaloniki and Mount Sinai. Together with his apprenticeship next to various teachers (like Photis Kontoglou), he also gained knowledge through his own experiments. Trying various materials, like eggs, straws, lime etc., as well as various techniques. In 1960 after he apprenticed next to Photis Kontoglou, he shifted from the Renaissance technique to the Byzantine one, which he followed since. In that work, he was also supported by the Archbishop of Cyprus Makarios III who sent him to Greece in 1962 for apprenticeship. The deep knowledge he acquired made him known in the entire Orthodox community. Demonstrative of his fame was his invitation in 1982 by the Archbishop Chrysostomos I of Cyprus to paint the katholikon of the Archbishopric of Cyprus.

== Work ==
Kallinikos studied many types of iconography, like fresco and encaustic painting which he learned in Mount Sinai during his visit in 1967. He started by painting with oil paint, while he later used more often eggs for the mixing of the colours. Paintings of his exist in many churches and monasteries in Cyprus and in other countries. His most important murals with the fresco technique are situated in the katholikon of the Stavrovouni Monastery. From 2006 and after he hpainted only using the encaustic painting technique. Moreover, his works have been featured in various exhibitions worldwide.

Apart from his rich artistic work, Kallinikos also did many philanthropy works. Like the Kallinikeio Municipal Building in his home town, Athienou, which was built with his contribution and serves various needs of the municipality and houses the local museum. In addition, he also was a renowned hagiography teacher passing his art and knowledge to newer hagiographers. An example of his teaching is a book he published about Byzantine painting:

- Η τεχνική της αγιογραφίας: με παράρτημα τοιχογραφιών του Πανσέληνου από το Πρωτατο του Αγίου Όρους. Μοναχός Καλλίνικος Σταυροβουνιώτης, Nicosia, Holy Archbishopic of Cyprus, 1996.

It is considered by many that Byzantine painting prospered in Cyprus because of Kallinikos who revived this technique in a time when the most icons had elements of Russian style with western influence. This was also the technique used in Mount Athos during the first half of the 20th century.

== Death ==
Kallinikos died aged 91 on 23 January 2011 in the Stavrovouni Monastery. The funeral service was held on the 25th of the same month and was buried in his hometown, Athienou. With his death, he left an important work and an extensive tradition on modern Orthodox Byzantine art.

== Sources ==
- Ο Καλλίνικος Σταυροβουνιώτης
- Το χωριό της Αθηαίνου - Αθηαινίτες που διακρίθηκαν στον πολιτισμό, τις τέχνες και τα γράμματα
- Αγιογραφικές θεοψίες - Έκθεση αγιογραφίας του μοναχού Καλλίνικου στην Ελληνική Τράπεζα
- Ο Αγιογράφος Καλλίνικος Σταυροβουνιώτης, Γιάννης Κ. Λάμπρου, Έκδοση Δήμου Αθηαίνου, p. 96, 2003.
- Η Αθηένου - Διμηνιαία εφημερίδα του Δήμου Αθηένου. Τεύχος 2, Αύγουστος-Σεπτέμβριος 2007.
