= Thimistokles Magoulas =

Greek sailor

Thimistokles Magoulas (born 21 July 1927) is a Greek former sailor who competed in the 1964 Summer Olympics.
