= Giorgos Toussas =

Greek politician

Giorgos Toussas (Greek: Γιώργος Τούσσας) (born 8 September 1954) is a Greek politician and Member of the European Parliament (MEP) for the Communist Party of Greece; part of the European United Left–Nordic Green Left. He was born in Koilada.
