= Hellenic Air Force General Staff =

- Γενικό Επιτελείο Αεροπορίας
- Seal of the Hellenic Air Force General Staff
- Active: 1934–present
- Country: Greece
- Branch: Hellenic Air Force
- Type: Staff
- Part of: Ministry of National Defence
- Garrison/HQ: Athens
- Website: http://www.haf.gr/

Commanders
- Chief: Lieutenant General Dimosthenis Grigoriadis

The Hellenic Air Force General Staff (Greek: Γενικό Επιτελείο Αεροπορίας, abbrev. ΓΕΑ) is the general staff of the Hellenic Air Force, the air component of the Greek Armed Forces. It was established in 1934. Since 1950, the HAFGS is subordinated to the Hellenic National Defence General Staff. The Chief of the HAFGS (Αρχηγός ΓΕΑ, Α/ΓΕΑ) is the head of the Hellenic Air Force.

== Structure ==
The Hellenic Air Force General Staff is the highest organ of the Hellenic Air Force, operating under the command of the Hellenic National Defence General Staff. The HAFGS in turn supervises the Hellenic Tactical Air Force Command, the Hellenic Air Force Support Command, and the Hellenic Air Force Training Command.

The Hellenic Air Force General Staff itself is headed by the Chief of the HAFGS (Αρχηγός ΓΕΑ, Α/ΓΕΑ), assisted by a Deputy Chief (Υπαρχηγός ΓΕΑ), an Inspectorate-General (Γενική Επιθεώρηση), the Flight and Ground Safety Centre (ΚΕΑΠΕ), the Legal Counsel Office, and the secretariat of the Supreme Air Force Council.

The Deputy Chief of the HAFGS oversees a staff office, the secretariat of the HAFGS, the Medical Directorate, and the four branches that comprise the HAFGS itself:

- I Branch, Operations, with five directorates and the national Operations Centre (ΚΕΠΙΧ)
- II Branch, Personnel, with five directorates
- III Branch, Support, with five directorates
- IV Branch, Policy and Planning, with four directorates

The HAFGS further has direct supervision over a number of special-purpose units and formations, such as the Hellenic Air Force Academy, the 251 Air Force Hospital, and the Hellenic National Meteorological Service.
