= Georgios Bakatselos =

Greek politician (1906–1992)

Georgios Bakatselos (Greek: Γεώργιος Μπακατσέλος; Ellinokastro, Mouzaki, 1906 – 23 January 1992) was a Greek lawyer and politician. He acted as an MP and as a minister.
