= Georgios Boustras =

Greek scientist

- Born: May 1973 (age 53); Athens, Greece
- Education: Kingston University London
- Scientific career
- Fields: Safety, risk modelling
- Workplaces: European University Cyprus
- Thesis: Probabilistic Fire Risk Assessment (2003)

Georgios Boustras (Greek: Γεώργιος Μπούστρας; born May 1973) is a professor of risk assessment at European University Cyprus and editor-in-chief of Safety Science, a scientific journal published by Elsevier. He is the director of the Centre of Excellence in Risk & Decision Sciences (CERIDES) at European University Cyprus. He is a Member of the European Union Mission Board in Climate Adaptation. Boustras's research interests include the development, use and evaluation of statistical models for risk assessment, occupational and societal safety.

== Education ==
George Boustras received a Bachelor's degree in chemical engineering and a Master of Science (MSc) degree in energy resources management from London South Bank University in 1995 and 1997, respectively. He received the Doctor of Philosophy (PhD) degree in Probabilistic Fire Risk Assessment from Kingston University London in 2003. He was an Honorary Research fellow at Imperial College London from 2003 to 2005, and a KTP Research Fellow at the Fire Safety Engineering Group (FSEG) at the University of Greenwich in 2009.

== Career ==
Boustras worked as an external agent for the World Bank to modernize licensing services of the Hellenic Fire Service. He was appointed by the President of the Republic of Cyprus, Nicos Anastasiades as vice president of Cyprus's Energy Strategy Council. He has advocated for the need for radical changes in civil protection in response to climate change. In March 2023, he was appointed by Cypriot President Nikos Christodoulides as a special advisor in civil protection and crisis management.
