= Georgios Boutris =

Greek basketball player

Giorgos Boutris
No. 10 – Aris Petroupolis BC
- Position: Point guard
- League: Greek C Basketball League

Personal information
- Born: July 24, 1995 (age 31) Athens, Greece
- Listed height: 6 ft 3 in (1.91 m)
- Listed weight: 176 lb (80 kg)

Career information
- Playing career: 2014–present

Career history
- 2014–2015: AEK Athens (Greece)
- 2015–2016: Mandraikos B.C. (Greece 4th)
- 2016-present: Aris Petroupolis B.C. (Greece 4th)

Career highlights
- 1st Position with Mandraikos B.C.

Giorgos Boutris (alternate spellings: Georgios, Mpoutris) (Greek: Γιώργος Μπούτρης; born July 24, 1995) is a Greek professional basketball player for AEK Athens of the Greek Basket League. He is 1.90 m (6 ft 3 in) tall.

== Youth career ==
Boutris played from a young age with AEK Athens, before he started his pro career.

== Professional career ==
Boutris signed his first professional contract with AEK Athens on 23 September 2014. After that he signed with Mandraikos BC and won the championship (Greece C Basketball League) . Now he is playing for Aris Petroupolis BC.
