= Georgios Agiotis =

Greek footballer

Personal information
- Full name: Georgios Agiotis
- Date of birth: 18 March 1999 (age 27)
- Place of birth: Volos, Greece
- Height: 1.84 m (6 ft 0 in)
- Position: Centre-back

Youth career
- 2013–2018: Olympiacos

Senior career*
Years	Team	Apps	(Gls)
2018–2019	Apollon Larissa	7	(0)
2019–2020	Kerkyra	10	(0)
2020	Diagoras	2	(0)
2020–2021	Doxa Drama	11	(0)
2021–2022	Ermis Aradippou		
2022	Chania	0	(0)

International career^{‡}
2014–2015	Greece U16	4	(0)
- * Club domestic league appearances and goals as of 18 May 2021 ‡ National team caps and goals as of 22 January 2015

Georgios Agiotis (Greek: Γεώργιος Αγιώτης; born 18 March 1999) is a Greek professional footballer who plays as a centre-back.
