= Georgios Ballas =

Greek footballer (born 2001)

Personal information
- Full name: Georgios Ballas
- Date of birth: 7 April 2001 (age 25)
- Place of birth: Volos, Greece
- Height: 1.83 m (6 ft 0 in)
- Position: Forward

Team information
- Current team: Olympiacos Volos

Youth career
- –2017: Magnisiakos
- 2017–2018: PAOK
- 2018–2020: Volos

Senior career*
Years	Team	Apps	(Gls)
2020–2021	Volos	5	(0)
2021–2023	Niki Volos	5	(0)
2022	→ AEP Kozani (loan)	9	(2)
2023–2024	Pierikos	8	(0)
2024	Veria	14	(3)
2024–	Olympiacos Volos	28	(4)
- * Club domestic league appearances and goals as of 16 June 2023

Georgios Ballas (Greek: Γεώργιος Μπάλλας; born 7 April 2001) is a Greek professional footballer who plays as a forward.
