= Georgios Poniros =

Greek footballer

Personal information
- Full name: Georgios Poniros
- Date of birth: 8 October 1987 (age 39)
- Place of birth: Athens, Greece
- Height: 1.84 m (6 ft 0 in)
- Position: Goalkeeper

Team information
- Current team: A.E. Ermionida F.C.

Youth career
- Akarnanikos

Senior career*
Years	Team	Apps	(Gls)
2008–2011	Panetolikos	7	(0)
2010–2011	→ Aias Salamina (on loan)	22	(0)
2011–2012	Diagoras F.C.	13	(0)
2012–	A.E. Ermionida F.C.		
- * Club domestic league appearances and goals

Georgios Poniros (Γεώργιος Πονηρός; born 8 October 1987) is a professional football goalkeeper. He currently plays for A.E. Ermionida F.C.

Poniros started his career at Akarnanikos. In the summer of 2008, he signed with Panetolikos On 23 August 2010, he signed a 1-year loan contract with Gamma Ethniki team Aias Salamina F.C. In the summer of 2011, he signed with Diagoras F.C.
