= Georgios Balatsinos =

Greek conductor

- Born: 5 August 1983 (age 41); Athens, Greece
- Citizenship: Greece; Switzerland
- Occupation: Conductor
- Spouse: Vera Sabantseva
- Children: 2
- Website: georgios-balatsinos.com

Georgios Balatsinos (Greek: [ʝɔɾɣɔs bɐlɐt͡siˈnɔs], born in Athens (5 August 1983) is a Greek-Swiss conductor and composer.

His engagements include appearances in the Greek National Opera, Athens Megaron, Berliner Philharmonie, Wiener Musikverein, and Konzerthaus Wien. He has collaborated with world-class soloists such as Julian Rachlin, Carmen Giannattasio, Kyrill Trousov, Christina Poulitsi, Wolfgang Boettcher, and Nobuko Imai, and has worked alongside celebrated stage directors like Barrie Kosky, Carlus Padrisa, and Mirko Mahr.

His career highlights include conducting Norma at the Athens Festival, The Magic Flute at the Greek National Opera, Turandot in Empoli and L’Italiana in Algeri at the Opera Wrocławska where he also led the 80th Anniversary Gala of the Opera House.

Balatsinos has conducted numerous esteemed orchestras, including London Symphony Orchestra, Berliner Symphoniker, Opera Wuppertal, NOSPR Katowice, Orchestra Sinfonica Siciliana, Sinfonica di Milano, Orchestre Philharmonique de Nice, and ensembles across Hungary, Russia, Canada, and the Czech Republic.

== Early life ==
At the age of 6 he studied violin in Corfu. Around the age of 16, he was distinguished with the 1st prize in the Panhellenic Music Competition of the Ministry of Education in the string category as well as in the composition category with his String Trio op.4 which was played by musicians from Athens State Orchestra.

At 17 he went to Germany to learn and master his instrument in Detmold. Further studies on viola and composition are added. He studied violin, viola, composition and conducting in Detmold, Geneva, Bern, Luzern and Milano. He studied conducting at the Hochschule der Kunst Luzern with R. Weikert and at the Conservatorio G. Verdi with V. Parisi.

At 19, he became the youngest member of the Sinfonieorchester Basel.

== Career ==
As an active student he took part at numerous international master classes with David Zinman, Péter Eötvös, Gennady Rozhdestvensky, Michail Jurowski, Neeme Järvi. He was also a finalist of the 15th Conductor workshop "Interaction" of the Critical Orchestra Berlin with leading musicians from Berliner Philharmoniker, Staatskapelle Berlin and Sächsische Staatskapelle Dresden.

Balatsinos appointed, since 2010, artistic director of Jugendsinfonieorchester Arabesque.

In January 2015 he was among the 4 top conductors (out of the 130 applicants) selected by International conductor David Zinman who lead a workshop for young conductors at the National Arts Centre Orchestra.

He won the International Concert Competition "Debut Berlin" (Conducting, 2016) and received the 1st prize at the International Conducting Competition "Black Sea" (Romania, 2012). Moreover, he was one of the three finalists at the internationalworkshop Interaktion of Kritisches Orchester (Berlin, 2017).

In 2022, Balatsinos was named for two years as Chief Conductor of Sorbisches National Ensemble Musiktheater.

For the 2023-24 season, Balatsinos has been appointed Permanent Kapellmeister Conductor of Opera Breslau (Opera Wrocławska) and serves as Chief Conductor of SNE Theatre in Bautzen, Germany.
