= Georgios Benos =

Greek footballer

Personal information
- Date of birth: 29 March 1964 (age 62)
- Place of birth: Kalamata, Greece

Managerial career
- Years: Team
- 2000–2001: Leonidio
- 2001: Kalamata
- 2002: Kavala
- 2003: Kavala
- 2006–2007: Thiva
- 2008–2009: Kalamata
- 2009–2010: Kalamata
- 2010: Trikala
- 2012: Kalamata
- 2019: Sparta

Georgios Benos (Greek: Γεώργιος Μπένος; born 29 March 1964) is a Greek football manager.
