= Georgios Christodoulis =

Greek footballer (born 2001)

Personal information
- Date of birth: 4 January 2001 (age 25)
- Place of birth: Katerini, Greece
- Height: 1.91 m (6 ft 3 in)
- Position: Goalkeeper

Team information
- Current team: Hellas Syros
- Number: 37

Youth career
- 2013–2019: Panathinaikos
- 2019–2020: Asteras Tripolis

Senior career*
| Years | Team | Apps | (Gls) |
| 2020–2021 | Pierikos | | |
| 2020 | → Ethnikos Keramidiou (loan) | | |
| 2021 | Iraklis | | |
| 2021–2024 | Ionikos | 13 | (0) |
| 2024–2025 | Egaleo | 4 | (0) |
| 2025–2026 | Ilioupoli | 4 | (0) |
| 2026– | Hellas Syros | 0 | (0) |
- * Club domestic league appearances and goals as of 25 October 2025

Georgios Christodoulis (Greek: Γεώργιος Χριστοδουλής; born 4 January 2001) is a Greek professional footballer who plays as a goalkeeper for Super League 2 club Hellas Syros.
