= Georgios Balanos =

Greek translator, author, publisher and researcher

Balanos Georgios (1944–2020) was a Greek translator, author, publisher and researcher of the fields of science fiction, paranormal and magick.

According to his official biography presented on his web site, he was born in Athens on 12 April 1944 and attended various university schools without receiving any qualifications. His bio include work as teacher of English language, a photographer, a journalist, a translator and an author.

== Science fiction-translation ==
Balanos has worked in the field of science fiction and fantasy for many years. Within the Greek novels publisher "Aurora", he translated a great amount of short and medium size novels. One of the most distinctive characteristics, due to which he justifiably became noted, of these his translations is his comments in prologues, where he gave clues about some elements of the unexplained and the paranormal. Balanos' translating activity had begun years before the "Aurora" period. As far back as the early and mid 1980s he had published on his own efforts (through his own "Selefais" publications) several collections of translated science fiction, heroic fantasy and fantasy literature. He was the first to translate into Greek a wide variety of works by renowned English-speaking science fiction and fantasy writers, such as Isaac Asimov, Alfred Bester, Algernon Blackwood, Ray Bradbury, Arthur C. Clarke, Philip Jose Farmer, Harry Harrison, William H. Hodgson, Robert E. Howard, Henry Kuttner, Fritz Leiber, H. P. Lovecraft, Arthur Machen, Clifford Simak, Clark Ashton Smith, H. G. Wells, Colin Wilson, John Wyndham, Roger Zelazny, etc., the vast majority of whom were virtually unknown to the Greek public up to then.

== Balanos's own works ==
George Balanos is positively a prominent figure in the paranormal research field in Greece. A one-time APRO's local representative, apart from being a most celebrated translator into Greek of many famous English-speaking science-fiction and fantasy writers, he has also written many books of his own, which are the outcome of a lifelong research into the paranormal and occult. The titles of the books written by him follow below:

- "Flying Saucers – Intruders?" ("Iptamenoi Discoi – Eisvoleis?", 1973)
- “Beings from Outer Space” (“Onta Apo To Diastima”, 1974)
- “The Worlds of Fire” (“Oi Kosmoi Tis Fotias”, 1976)
- “The Sands of Time” (“Oi Ammoi Tou Khronou”, 1977)
- "In Search of Unknown Worlds ("Anazitontas Agnostous Kosmous", 1979)
- “Dreamlands of the Earth” (“Oi Oneirotopoi Tis Ghis”, science fiction short story collection 1979)
- "The Enigma of Penteli" ("To Enigma tis Pentelis, 1982)
- "Pathways of the Stars" ("Ta Monopatia ton Astron, 1989, science fiction novel)
- “Cosmic Biodynamics,” (“Kosmiki Bhiodhynamiki”, 1993)
- "Other Oceans, Other Worlds" ("Alloi Okeanoi, Alloi Kosmoi, 1993)
- "All the Colors of the Suns" ("Ola ta Krhomata ton Ilion, science fiction short story collection, 1994)
- "Bright Thorns" ("Lambera Agathia", fantasy novel, 1995)
- “Enigmas Against a Gray Background” (“Ainighmata Se Grizo Fonto”,1998)
- “The Roads of Knowledge” (“Oi Dhromoi Tis Ghnosis”, 1998),
- “The Shadow of Cthulhu” (“I Skia Tou Kthoulou”, 1993–98)
- “Hecate’s Nights” (“Nyktes Tis Ekatis”, 1998, supernatural horror/magick novel)
- “Something Crawling Like A Shadow” (“Kati Pou Erpei San Skia”, 2000)
- "Reflections on Dark Waters" ("Antanaklaseis se Vathia Nera")
- "In the Forests of the Twilight" ("Sta Dasi tou Lykofotos")
- “Beyond the Penteli Enigma” (“Pera Apo To Enigma Tis Pentelis”, 2004)

== Journalism ==
Balanos has worked as a journalist for the field of paranormal for various editions, most known "Strange" and "Anexighito" (Unexplained) magazines (and back in the 1970s writing in "Enigmata tou Symbandos" [Enigmas of the Universe) and "UFO – Iptamenoi Diskoi" (UFOs – Flying Saucers] magazines). He contributed articles on various fields of research of paranormal concerning cities, geometries, symbols, initiations, biographies of secret-famous magicians. Characteristics of his articles is the use of humour, often black, hidden personal vanity (indirectly presenting himself as a keeper of secret knowledge), and extensive scientific knowledge of various scientific fields.

== Research fields ==
The research fields of Balanos are mostly noted in his books and are Magick techniques, psychology, history, paranormal phenomena. According to his books, his actions often attracted the interest of various governmental and non-governmental organisations (Translated title from Greek) Something that crawls like a shadow, ISBN 960-7971-04-3. There is an element of truth concerning that since earlier attempts to understand the alleged phenomena at the cave Ntaveli of Penteli mountain in the area of Attica, found some resistance from the Greek authorities, and this led to some actions of prohibiting the entry to the cave. The result of the research of the cave lead to a book (Translated title from Greek) The Enigma of Penteli, 1982 (ISBN unknown).

== Cosmic biodynamics ==
The outcome of Balanos’ research over the years was the cosmic biodynamics system, an original synthesis comprising many notions from a wide variety of fields, such as anthropology, philosophy, physics, mathematics, biology, and chemistry, the basic premises of which consist in the following: the surrounding universe is, in fact, a vastly intricate, multidimensional whole, wherein the phenomenon of existence is conceived as something radically different and wider than most of the various philosophical, religious, mystical, political, etc., systems assume it to be. Everything in this multidimensional cosmos stems from the Cosmic Network. The Cosmic Network is the ‘blueprint’, so to speak, of both the macrocosm and the microcosm. Every being that exists anywhere in the wide universe is an integral part of this network. We can get ourselves attuned to this cosmic network by bringing to surface and enhancing our latent unconscious potentialities, the so-called "other senses". Balanos uses the phrase "to see the world through Other Eyes" ("Alla Matia") when referring to this last process.

== The Crawling Shadow ==
Balanos in one of his books has named a new type of danger, that is a multidimensional force called Shadow. Attributed to the Shadow are paranormal memory loss, violence, phenomena of massive hysteria, and events of extraordinary evil.

== Opinions ==
Readers of his books suggest that elements of his stories, theories, and research have been drawn by other writers, and they give as an example that his current definition of the word Pattern (who has copyrighted the translated Greek equivalent), has the same meaning with the word occurring to the science fiction Amber Series by Roger Zelazny. It is true that Balanos may have borrowed various notions from a wide field of disciplines, such as anthropology, philosophy, occultism, quantum physics, higher mathematics, biology, etc., but he synthesized all of these elements into a new and original system. So far as the term Pattern and Balanos' copyrighted translation into Greek (i.e., "Morphodiataxis") are concerned, this has nothing to do with whatever science fiction writer R. Zelazny means by it. Morphodiataxis is a core term in Balanos' Cosmic Biodynamics system, and it denotes the real whole of any given situation or phenomenon, taking into consideration all those data that elude our common, untrained senses.
