= Yorgos Avgeropoulos =

Greek journalist and filmmaker

Yorgos Avgeropoulos (Greek: Γιώργος Αυγερόπουλος; born 1971) is a Greek journalist and documentary filmmaker. He is the creator of the Greek awarded documentary series "Exandas".

He was born in Athens in 1971. He has worked for Greek television stations covering news stories in Greece and major events around the world. He has also worked as a war correspondent in the wars in Bosnia, Croatia, Iraq, Afghanistan, Kosovo and Palestine. In 2000, he created the documentary series "Exandas" (meaning sextant) which has won many awards in film festivals and documentary festivals in Greece and around the world and is currently broadcast on Greek public television.

His documentary Agora deals with the Greek financial crisis. Political actors and everyday people are interviewed on the social effects of austerity. In 2021, George Avgeropoulos presented the timely documentary PARONTES about the Covid-19 pandemic, which is available online.
