= Lia Lapithi =

Cypriot artist

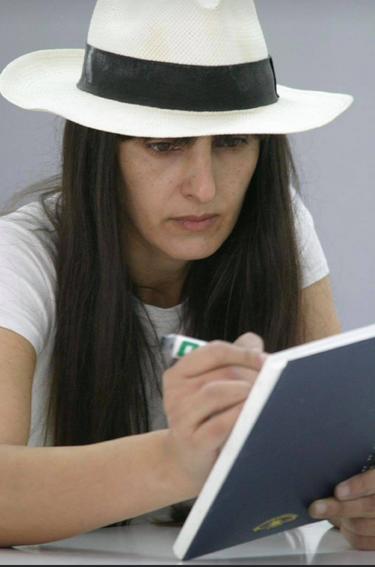
- Born: Lia Lapithi; 1963 (age 62–63); Nicosia, Cyprus
- Known for: Visual Arts
- Website: lialapithi.com

Lia Lapithi (born Lia Lapithi, 1963) is a Greek Cypriot artist specialising in multimedia and visual art. She currently resides in Nicosia.

== Early life and education ==
Lia Lapithi was born in Nicosia, Cyprus, in 1963. She studied Art and Environmental Design at the University of California Santa Cruz, followed by a Master of Philosophy at Lancaster University. After her studies she returned to Cyprus in 1984. She continued her studies in 1989, obtaining a Master's degree in Architecture from the Kent Institute of Art and Design in 1991, followed by a Masters in Art Education from the University of Wales in 1994.

== Career ==
Her work focused initially on landscape and still-life painting through the use of technology, followed by medical art, evolving over time to also address environmental and political issues, including collective memory, nationalist historiography and the Cyprus Dispute. She has been credited for creating the first Cypriot feminist art group in 2006, called "Washing-Up Ladies". The group has addressed topics ranging from the relationship of women to contemporary Cypriot politics, to women's gender roles in Cypriot society. Lapithi's work has also been hosted by various museums and galleries, while numerous of her pieces form part of permanent museum collections. During her career she has exhibited her work in various locations, including in Athens, Alexandria, Paris, Vienna and Constantinople. In 2023, she also gained international attention as a core contributor to the Cyprus pavilion at the 18th Venice Biennale of Architecture, presenting the project From Khirokitia to Mars, which explored social sustainability, cultural heritage, and space exploration.

== Permanent museum collections ==
Works of Lia Lapithi held in permanent museum collections include:

- “Still-life III”, “Mechanical Billboard I”, “Blue Legs”, “Leg Operation video”, “Circulation Bed”, “Test Tube Bed”, “Olive-bread” “Defining Silence”, “Peace-Dinner” and "82,5km", held by the Cypriot State Collection of Contemporary Art in Nicosia, Cyprus.
- "Marinated Crushed Olives" (video), held by Centre Pompidou in Paris, France.
- "Marinated Crushed Olives" (video), held by the Museum of European and Mediterranean Civilisations in Marseille, France.
- "Requiem pour un oiseau rebelle" (installation), held by the Musées de la ville de Marseille in France.
- "Defining Silence", held by the BPS22 Musee d’Art de la Provence de Hainut-Charlerois in Belgium.

== Selected publications ==
- 2011 Suspended Spaces #1 Famagusta - Blackjack editions (Montreuil, France) ISBN 978-2-918063-10-0.
- 2012 Suspended Spaces #2 Blackjack editions (Paris) ISBN 978-2-918063-25-4.
- 2012 Contre Nature, Musee Departemental de l’Oise-Beauvais, ISBN 978-2-901290-25-4.
- 2014 Ethiques du gout, Editions L’ Harmattan, ISBN 978-2-343-03903-9.
- 2014 Suspended Spaces #3, Les Editions de l’ Ecole des Beaux Arts.

== See also ==
- Visual Arts
- Art film
