= Giorgos Markopoulos =

Greek poet (born 1951)

- Born: 1951 (age 74–75); Messene, Greece
- Occupation: poet
- Writing career
- Period: 1968–

Giorgos Markopoulos (Greek: Γιώργος Μαρκόπουλος; born 1951) is a Greek poet. He read Economics and Statistics at the University of Piraeus (then Higher School for Industrial Studies).

Markopoulos belongs to the so-called Genia tou 70, which is a literary term referring to Greek authors who began publishing their work during the 1970s, especially towards the end of the Greek military junta of 1967-1974 and at the first years of the Metapolitefsi.

Markopoulos was awarded the State Prize for Poetry in 1999 for his collection, Μη σκεπάζεις το ποτάμι, which was also nominated for the European Union Prize in 2000. His work has been translated into English, French, Italian and Polish.

== Selected poetry ==
- Έβδομη Συμφωνία (Seventh Symphony), 1968
- Η θλίψις του προαστίου (The Sadness of the Suburbs), 1976
- Οι πυροτεχνουργοί (The Bomb Squad), 1979
- Ποιήματα 1968–1987 (Poems 1968–1987), 1992
- Mη σκεπάζεις το ποτάμι (Don't Cover the River), 1998
