= Yiorgos Magoulas =

Greek Film and Orchestral Composer, Conductor and guitarist

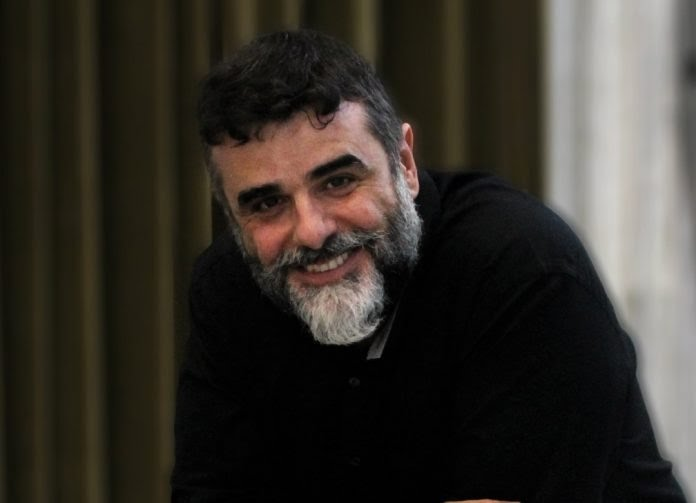
- Born: 1970 (age 55–56); Athens, Greece
- Education: National Conservatory of Athens and Morley College of London
- Occupations: Conductor, Film Composer, Arranger, Guitarist
- Notable work: War Zone (MEGA TV) Foteina Monopatia (ERT) ERT Contemporary Music Orchestra
- Awards: 1995 "Golden Hermes" 5th festival of Greek Advertisement
- Website: https://magoulas.weebly.com/

Yiorgos Magoulas (Greek: Γιώργος Μαγουλάς), is a successful composer of orchestral music and music for television and cinema. Among other projects, he has composed music for the documentary series WarZone (Εμπόλεμη Ζώνη, Mega TV) and FOTEINA MONOPATIA (Φωτεινά Μονοπάτια, ΕΡΤ), popular TV commercials and films. He has collaborated with the "Επιτροπή 2021 / Greece 2021" for the 200th anniversary of the Greek Revolution, released six CDs and his music has been recorded and performed by the Contemporary Music Orchestra of ERT.

== Biography ==
Born in Athens in 1970, Magoulas studied classical guitar, composition, arrangement and orchestration in Athens (National Conservatory of Athens) and London (Morley College of London).

- In 1991, at the age of 21, he began his professional career by writing music for the Research Theatre- Dimitris Potamitis.
- In 1995, he was awarded by the Golden Ermis Award.
- In 1998, following a selection of Stavros Xarchakos, he began his collaboration with the Great Hellenic Foundation (Ίδρυμα Μείζονος Ελληνισμού)
- In 2000, his oratorio Propitiation was presented in London, following an assignment by the Church of England.
- In 2014, he appeared as a soloist, performing his compositions at the Brussels Winter Jazz Festival.
- In 2015, he founded and conduct the Alter Move Orchestra.
- In 2021, he composed the music for the GREECE 2021 committee.

Six CDs albums with his own musical compositions and orchestral film music have been released, while his works have been recorded and performed by the ERT Contemporary Music Orchestra.

His works have been played in Greece, Cyprus, Turkey, England, Italy, Belgium and France.
