= Giorgos Kyriakakis =

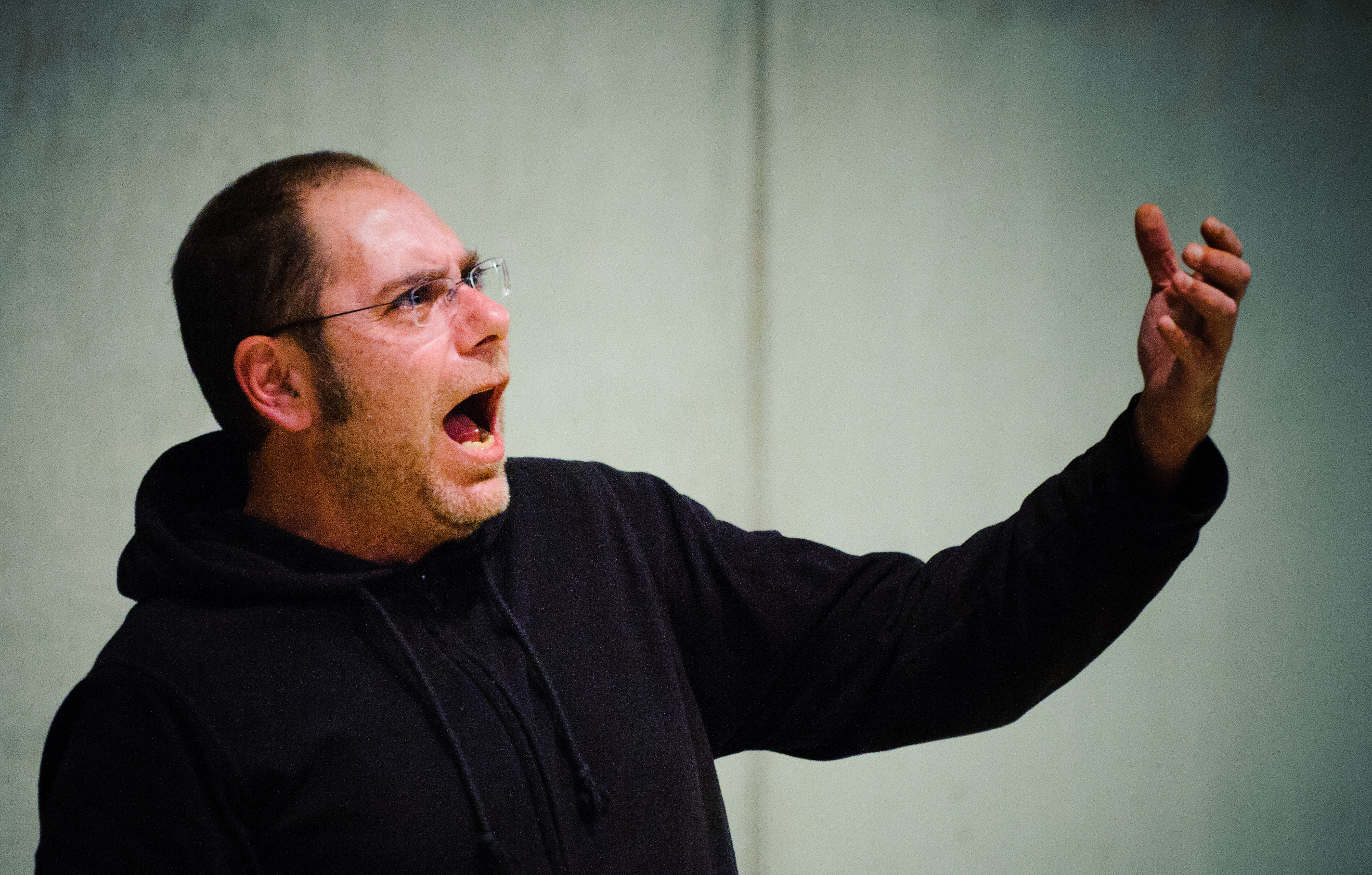
Giorgos Kyriakakis, 2011

Giorgos Kyriakakis is a Greek music composer.

He was born in 1967 in Crete, where he took his first music lessons.

He studied composition and analysis with Joseph Papadatos, music for the Media, non-European cultures' music with Dimitris Terzakis, electroacoustic composition with Eckhard Roedger, and Byzantine music with Lykourgos Angelopoulos.

He has composed works for solo instruments, chamber ensembles, choir, and orchestra, as well as music for children's theater and cinema.

His compositions have been performed in Greece and abroad. His works have been recorded by FM Records and ARKYS.

He is a member of the Union of Greek Composers.

He is a professor of composition at the Department of Music Art and Science at the University of Macedonia in Thessaloniki.

His works are published by Gravis and are available online.
