= Telemachos Kanthos =

Cypriot painter

- Born: February 24, 1910; Alona, Cyprus
- Died: November 18, 1993 (aged 83); Nicosia, Cyprus
- Known for: Painting

Telemachos Kanthos (February 24, 1910 – November 18, 1993) was a Greek Cypriot artist.

He was born in Alona, a village in the Pitsillia area, a mountainous region of Cyprus. He was born and raised in an artistic family in the village of Alona in Pitsillia. His father, Christodoulos Kanthos was a teacher and award-winning painter, his mother Eugenia Aravi was a farmer. His younger brother Theodotos Kanthos was also a painter and teacher.

Telemachos Kanthos is considered one of the fathers of Cypriot art. His works are varied but there is an obvious focus on Cypriot life and the Cypriot landscape. Some of his works were inspired and painted on the spot in the different countries that he traveled to, however the majority depict Cyprus, its people, its nature and his birthplace. His favorite thing to paint was the mountains surrounding Alona.

He maintained a close bond with his village up until the day he died. It is where his family home is as well as the house that he later built himself, in which he spent a lot of his creative time. He would often paint the wonders of nature in the charming light of Alona. Some of his most evocative work followed the Turkish invasion of Cyprus in 1974, where he recorded some of the suffering of the displaced persons and particularly those who had lost loved ones.

Kanthos attended the primary school of Alona and then the high school of Famagusta. In 1929 he went to study painting at the Athens School of Fine Arts (1929-1932 and 1934–1938), which was then part of the Technical University of Athens. He studied in the painting class of Spyros Vikatos, Dimitris Biskinis and Umbertos Argyros and later in the engraving class of Yannis Kefallinos.

From the summer of 1936, on the recommendation of the School, he worked, simultaneously with his studies, in the Aspiotis-ELKA graphic arts workshop in Corfu and Athens until the end of 1938. In 1939 he collaborated with Kefallinos on his personal works, especially in his book The Peacock. The war brought him to Cyprus, where he remained ever since. Between 1942 and 1944 he worked as an art teacher at Famagusta High School. Education benefited greatly from his inspiring contribution and many younger artists were his students. In the 1940s he actively participated in the creation of a local theatrical movement, undertaking the scenography and costume design of dozens of theatrical performances of the newly established Cypriot theatre "Lyric" and later the "New Lyric". At that time he also drew many portraits of actors. From 1951 to 1969 he worked at the Pancyprian Gymnasium in Nicosia. Kanthos pioneered every new movement of Cypriot artistic life and in 1964 he founded, alongside others, the Chamber of Fine Arts EKATE. From 1969 to 1975 he was a member of the Educational Service Committee of the Ministry of Education of Cyprus. He developed great cultural activity and was often a member of artistic committees of the Ministry of Education and other public bodies.

His work is entirely inspired by the landscape and the people of Cyprus. The starting point of his personal artistic pursuits was landscape painting of the 19th century. He studied the work of J.F. Millet and the other painters of the Barbizon School, as well as J.B.C. Corot. He then drew lessons from the Impressionists, the Post-Impressionists and especially from P. Cézanne. He expressed himself through painting (oil, watercolor) and engraving. His painting is characterized by great expressive power and lyricism. He was particularly interested in landscape painting and studied in depth the Cypriot light and color. His intention was not to faithfully copy the external characteristics of his subjects, but to freely transcribe and interpret them. Apart from his attempt to convey the tonalities of light, he did not ignore the essential features of the Cypriot area, which he projected through the discreet simplification, stylization and removal of complementary and anecdotal themes. A connoisseur of color, he used it boldly and sensitively to illustrate the thematic content, to give volumes and perspective at the same time, and finally to complete the expressive content of the subject. In order to activate his compositions, he chose contrast. In his earlier works he preferred tonal contrasts, but then turned more and more to chromatic ones. For the rendering of summer landscapes, particularly characteristic is the use of a series of ochres that he made himself by mixing Cypriot ombres.

Apart from landscapes, he also created works with scenes from the daily life of the village and the city, as well as compositions referring to the tragedy of Cyprus after the Turkish invasion in 1974. One of his last works, the largest in size, is a composition for the Women's Bazaar based on older designs. The design occupies much of its creation. Gifted with design acumen, he gave designs characterized by clarity, precision, nobility and interiority. His engraving is divided into that which created the first years after his return to Cyprus and then sporadically until 1973 and the one he carved after the Turkish invasion of 1974. In the first period he is thematically inspired by the everyday life of rural life. They are strictly structured, poetic and peaceful compositions, balanced through the contrasts of black and white, full and empty surfaces. In the series of woodcut engravings 'Hard Times' he created after 1974 he appears more monumental and epic. The series is characterized by drama and intensity. Without straying from the real, he simplifies, shapes and uses expressionist formulas to express strong emotions. The figures are placed in a pressing and neutral space, which accentuates the tragic nature of the scene.

Kanthos left a large number of oil paintings, drawings, watercolors and engravings. His works can be found in many state and private collections in Cyprus and other countries such as Greece, Austria, Germany and England and have been exhibited in various exhibitions in Cyprus and internationally. He presented his work in solo exhibitions (Nicosia, 1931, 1940; Famagusta, 1934, 1960; Union of Young Trusts, Nicosia, 1959; Hilton, Athens, 1972; Argo Gallery, Nicosia, 1973, 1992; Zygos Gallery, Nicosia, 1979; retrospective exhibition, National Gallery, Athens, 1982; Famagusta Gate, Nicosia, 1983; Gloria Gallery, Nicosia, 1991; Palais Pálffy, Vienna, 1991; retrospective exhibition, State Gallery, Nicosia, 1996). He also took part in group exhibitions (Agency for Intellectual Cooperation, Athens, 1962; Dasi gallery, Nicosia, 1962; Pancyprian 1964, 1965, 1966, 1967, 1971; Cairo, 1965; Boston, 1967; Panhellenic 1971, 1975; National Gallery, Athens, 1975; Belgrade, 1977; Sofia, 1979; Dimitria, Thessaloniki, 1979; Bucharest, Prague, Budapest, Sofia, 1981–1982; Alexandria Biennale, 1984; The Tree, Municipal Arts Centre, Nicosia, 1993, etc.). His works can be found in Cyprus (State Gallery of Contemporary Cypriot Art in Nicosia, Archbishop Makarios III Foundation Gallery, Famagusta Municipal Art Gallery - occupied, Limassol Municipal Art Gallery, A. G. Leventis Foundation), Greece (National Gallery – Alexandros Soutzos Museum, Athens Municipality Art Gallery, National Bank of Greece Cultural Foundation Collection, Bank of Greece) etc.

In more recent times, pictures of his paintings have been installed around Alona to commemorate his work.

== Sources ==
- "Telemachos Kanthos". Artfact.com.
- "TELEMACHOS KANTHOS". Spidernet.
- https://famagustanewmuseum.com/portfolio/telemachos-kanthos/
- https://www.leventisgallery.org/explore-the-aglc/collections/the-cyprus-collection/painting/55

== Links ==
- "Telemachos Ganthos' Wife on his last painting". YouTube.
- "Telemachos Kanthos Foundation".
