= Xanthos Hadjisoteriou =

- Born: 1920; Famagusta, Cyprus
- Died: 2003 (aged 82–83); Limassol, Cyprus
- Known for: Arts, design

Xanthos Hadjisoteriou (1920–2003), was an acclaimed Greek Cypriot painter and interior designer. Born in Famagusta in 1920 and studied business at University of Beirut (1938–1940). Later studied art at the Central School of Arts and Crafts in London (1951–1953) and interior design at the Byam Shaw School of Art (1959).

Xanthos Hadjisoteriou held many exhibitions in Cyprus and internationally. In Famagusta he presented his works permanently at the "Manastiri" and later at Peter's Gallery in Limassol, where he settled. He won many awards for his art internationally.

The artist died at the age of 83 in 2003.
