= Loukia Nicolaidou =

Cypriot painter

- Λουκία Νικολαΐδου-Βασιλείου
- Born: 1909; Limassol, Cyprus
- Died: 1994 (aged 84–85); London, England
- Other names: Loukia Nicolaidou-Vassiliou, Lucia Nikolaidou-Vassiliou
- Occupations: artist, painter
- Years active: 1929–1939

Loukia Nicolaidou (Greek: Λουκία Νικολαΐδου-Βασιλείου, 1909–1994) was the first Cypriot woman to study art abroad and is considered a pioneer for women professional artists in Cyprus. Her painting The Good Fruit of the Earth is part of the collections of the State Gallery of Contemporary Cypriot Art.

== Early life ==
Loukia Nicolaidou was born in 1909 to a wealthy family in Limassol. After graduating from the School of Foreign and Greek Languages, she began a correspondence course with the ABC School in Paris. Encouraged by the painter Vasilis Vryonidis, she made the unusual decision to go abroad to study. At the time, women were not typically engaged in professions, as the expectation was that their role was that of wife and mother. She enrolled in 1929 at the Académie Colarossi, where she spent one year before Konstantinos Dimitriadis, helped her enroll in the École Nationale des Beaux-Arts. One of the painters with whom she studied was Lucien Simon, who would influence her works. Graduating in 1933, she returned to Cyprus.

== Career ==
Nicolaidou hosted her first solo exhibition in 1934, in Nicosia and Limassol, but the public response was unfavorable to her modern tendencies. Works painted by Nicolaidou between 1929 and 1933, during her schooling tended to embrace European ideals and focus on the female body and sexuality. Upon her return to Cyprus, her work continued to explore women's form, but did so in a more primitive style, reminiscent of Paul Gauguin. Her palate shifted to warmer hues and her figures took on a more exotic appearance, with darker skin tones and hair. Her chosen subject matter challenged the traditional depictions of women, as domestic mothers and wives, in Cypriot art, portraying them instead as educated and liberated members of a cosmopolitan and progressive society. As one of the few Cypriot painters of her period who painted nudes, Nicolaidou's works are unique, in that they did not focus on women as objects of desire, but instead, her subjects are defiant, tend to ignore the viewer rather than engaging with the audience, and are typically monumental in size. Other themes present in her works include scenes of everyday life and landscapes.

After hosting other solo shows in 1935 and 1936, with lukewarm reception from the public, Nicolaidou moved to London in 1937, where and older sister was living. Like many other Cypriot women artists, moving abroad in a self-exile, allowed Nicolaidou to pursue a career in art, out from under the patriarchal restrictions of society in her homeland. In England, her works became more expressive with a focus on geometrical shapes, influenced by Picasso. In 1939, she participated in a group exhibition for which she received acclaim. That same year, she married, Ioannis Vassiliou, a ship owner from Hermoupolis and withdrew from public exhibitions, focusing on raising a family. Her works were largely forgotten in Cyprus until 1992, when art historian Eleni Nikita published a biography of her and restored Nicalaidou's pioneering role as an artist at a time when the profession excluded women.

== Death and legacy ==
Nicolaidou died in London in 1994. She is remembered as one of the pioneers of modern art in Cyprus and her works are held in the State Gallery of Contemporary Art (Greek: Κρατική Πινακοθήκη Σύγχρονης Τέχνης) in Nicosia "that is informally referred to as the Fathers section". She also has works in the collections of Bank of Cyprus and in the art gallery of the Municipal Bank of Limassol.
