= Yorgos Kypris =

Cypriot sculptor

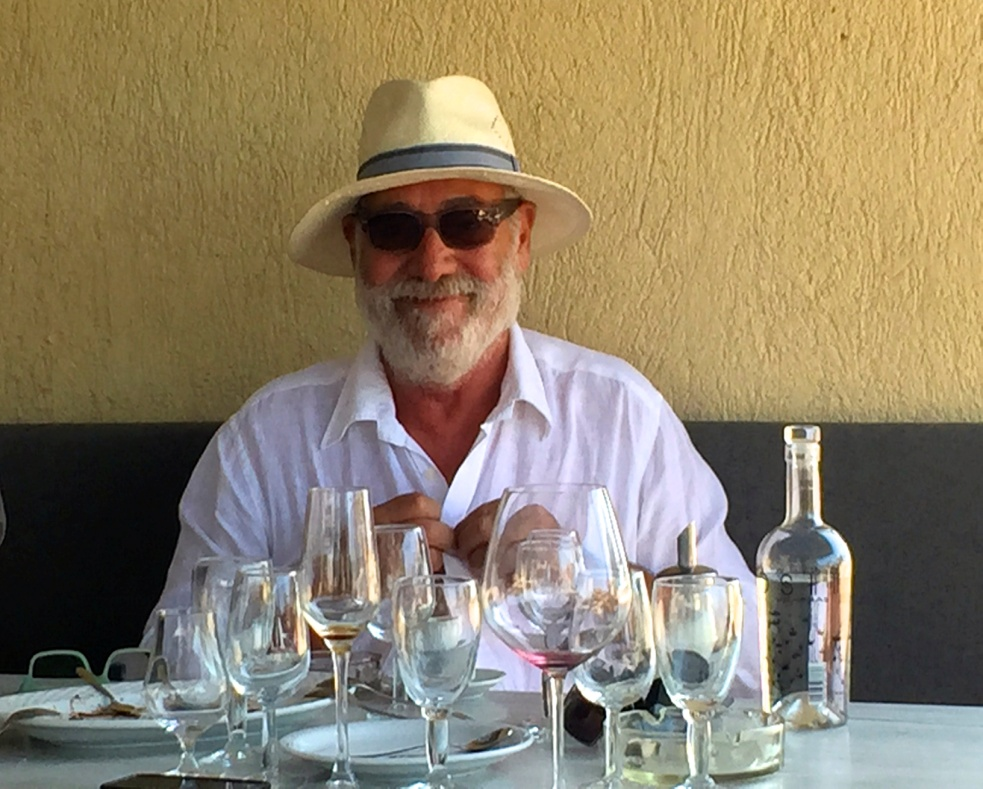
- Yorgos Kypris in 2016
- Born: George Kypris (Greek: Γεώργιος Κυπρής); March 11, 1954; Nicosia, Cyprus
- Education: Istituto Statale d' Arte per la Ceramica, Faenza, Italy
- Known for: Sculpture, installations, ceramics
- Notable work: Fish Conditions (body of works) (1995); Ceremonial Boats (body of works) (1994); About Cages & Flights (body of works) (1998); Parallel Notions (body of works) (1997-2001); The Gate of Knowledge (1998); Iconoclastic Exercises (body of works) (2016)
- Spouse: Antonella Toschi

Yorgos Kypris (Greek: Γιώργος Κυπρής; born 11 March 1954), is a Cypriot sculptor who lives and works between Athens and Santorini in Greece. He continues to take part in numerous solo and group exhibitions, commissions work, designs jewelry and permanently exhibits his work through MATI, his personal art gallery. His work has been published in a number of books, articles and magazines. His best known works include the "Entrapped Fish" installation, at the Lobby of the World Bank Building, Washington D.C., commissioned in 1997, the "Gate of Knowledge" - a sculptural steel gate, erected in 1998 in the yard of St. Paul High school, Pafos, Cyprus, the body of works "Fish" (1993-), the "Parallel Notions" body of works (2001) and the "Observers", an installation of four sited figures on poles, 4,5m high each, commissioned (2002) at Fabrica Commercial Center, Fira, Santorini, Greece.

== Life and career ==
Yorgos Kypris is the second of three sons, born of Greek Cypriot parents. Kypris moved from Cyprus to Athens, Greece at the age of thirteen. There he attended the Sarafianos School of Art, where he studied drawing and painting. Between 1975 and 1979 he studied at the Istituto Statale d' Arte per la Ceramica, Faenza, Italy. During his studies in Italy he worked with the Italian sculptor Domenico Matteuci and Greek sculptor Panos Tsolakos. In 1980 he returned to Athens to establish "Studio 71" alongside ceramic artist Antonella Toschi where they produced design objects and sculptures. In 1990, he abandoned ceramics and he expands by experimenting with new art forms and materials such as metals, foam, plastic, castings and installations. In 1985 he married Antonella Toschi. The couple has two children, a son and a daughter.

He has shown his work in numerous solo exhibitions in Europe and USA and has participated in group exhibitions in Museums and Foundations in Greece, Cyprus, USA, France, Italy, Swiss, Sweden, Luxemburg, Hungary, Turkey, Denmark and the United Kingdom. Commissioned works and environments of Kypris make part of public and private collections in Europe, North & South America and Asia. He has published articles in art magazines and designed jewellery & pottery for Greek and Italian manufacturers. He has won awards in art competitions in Greece and abroad.

Kypris' personal art gallery, MATI, is located in the island of Santorini in Greece and offers the artist's sculptural & jewellery work along with a selection of work from Greek pioneering jewellery designers.

== Art practice ==
Kypris' work focuses often in the human psyche. Through his multi-media oeuvre he attends to highlight the egocentric and cruel aspects of human race. The issues that mostly interest him are void, loneliness, sadness, vanity, immigration, religion and applied politics.

== Works ==
=== Fish ===
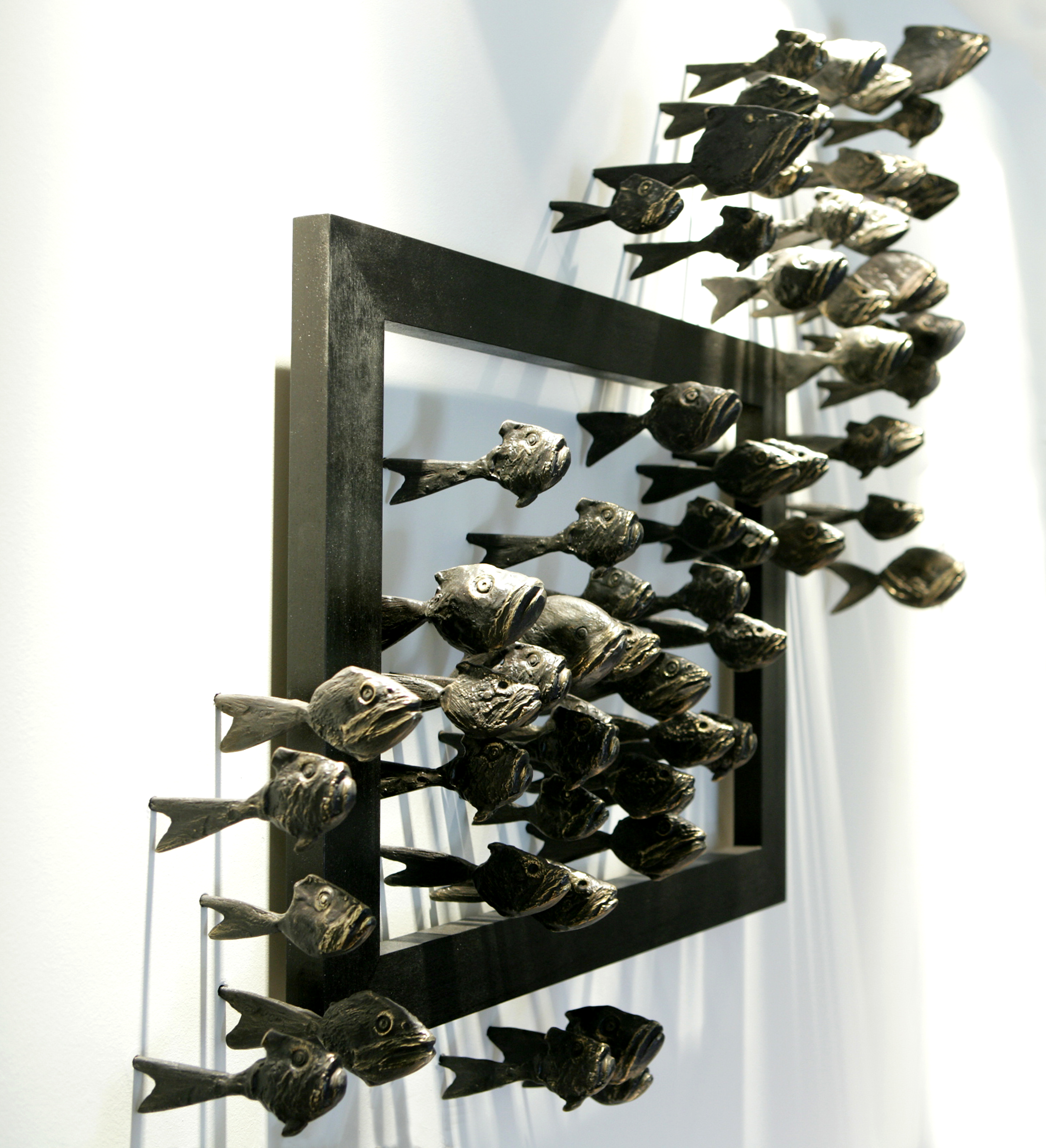
Entrapped Fish (1995)

The “Fish” series is the artist's most continuous work as well as the largest in volume. It is an ongoing body of works since 1993. Kypris is interested in showing the cruelty of the human race by illuminating (highlighting) our sovereignty on other forms of life. He mainly presents fish as victims of the feeding and preservation needs of human kind. Consequently, he attempts to bring forward issues regarding the ecological impact of man on nature.

=== Boats ===
Sea travels and the ancestral relation of the artist with the marine civilizations of the Mediterranean, urged him to create his ceremonial boats which carry people to other lands interspersing their own culture.

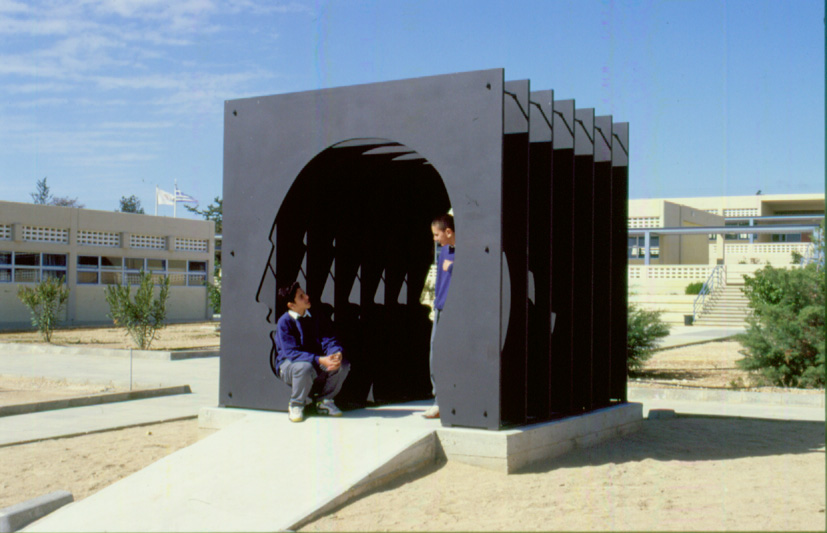
1st Prize for “The Gate of Knowledge”. Competition for installation of a sculpture at St. Paul High School, Pafos, Cyprus

=== Cages & Flights ===
Cages & Flights begin with a long dive into the world of Kypris' childhood and his dreams, to capture feelings that turn into memories, self-delusions, tears and anxieties. The works are pretexts, which he collects from the depths of his memories expressing them with humor and self-sarcasm.

=== Parallel notions ===
Yorgos Kypris’ “Parallel Notions" is a study on solitude and the consequential notions of sleep-death-abandonment. Using mainly steel, x-rays, colored slides and pillows he creates bed installations, dealing with the end (death) in a conceptual way. With austere forms and lines he organizes the presence of solitude and abandonment creating installations like in a mystic ritual.

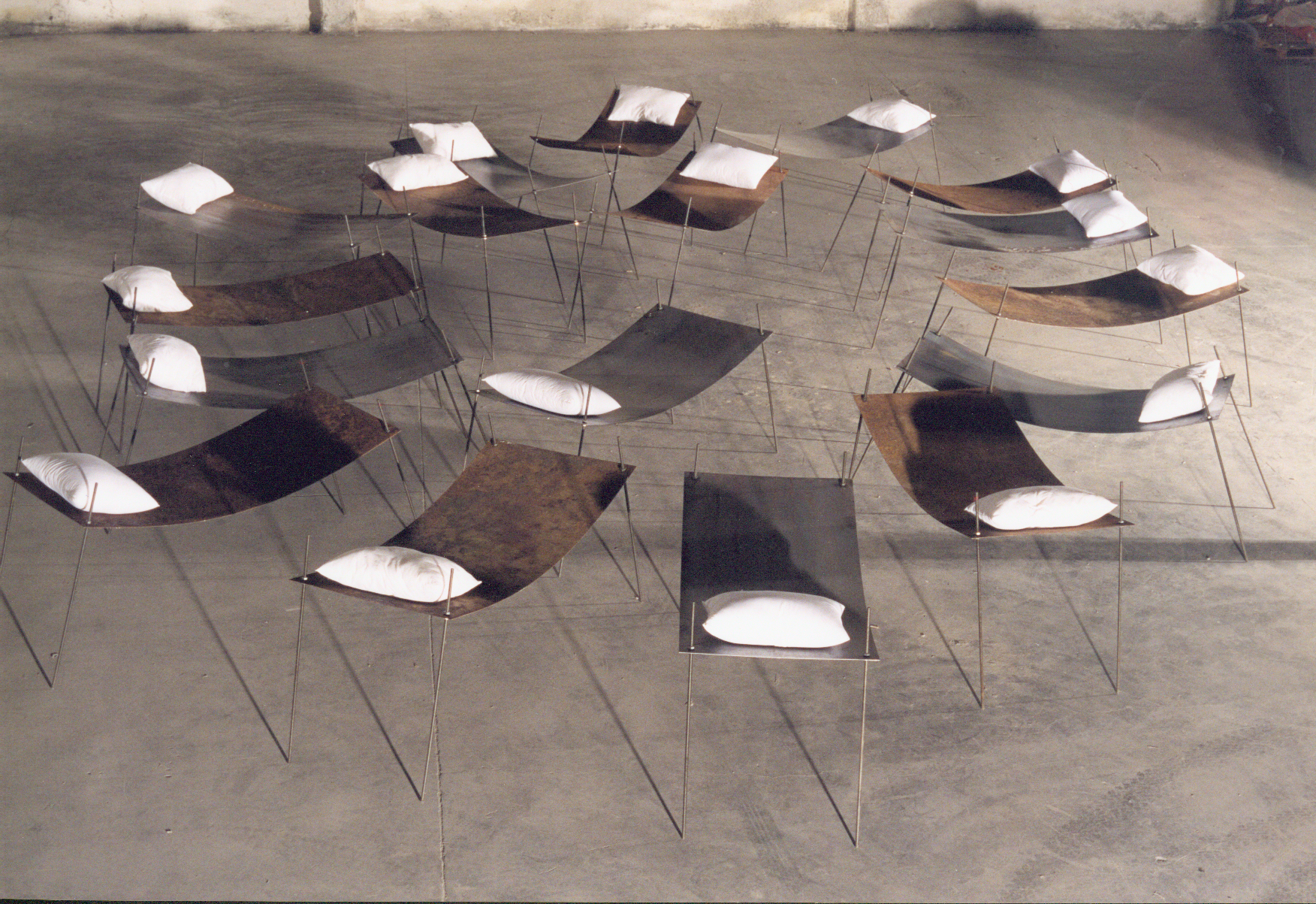
Untiled (1999). From the "Parallel Notions" body of works.

=== Vanity ===
The themes-symbols employed, touch upon images which dominate the media in terms of density and frequency and that are imposed as an ethos and lead to a common desire for the mass consumption of an “unbearable lightness of being” lifestyle. He had the urge to create these works out of a feeling that many of his daily habits result from certain mass obsessions. The obsessions, he believes, are imposed on us and make us waste time on such “values” as fashion & beauty, religious zeal & power, spectacle & success. The main source of inspiration and archive of information in the development of this body of works are television and cuttings from newspapers and magazines he has been collecting selectively for many years.

== Recent projects ==
In 2015, Yorgos Kypris began a new series of work that, in a caustic manner, commented on any form of power that has contributed over time to the development of society. Associating religion with politics, he created compositions that raise powerful and relevant questions about the influence that such a relationship impacts in societies. As his work developed, he began to touch issues pertaining to the extraneous characteristics-symbols of a state religion, either referring to Orthodoxy, Protestantism or Islam but he did not strike them down. He simply maintained them to narrate some of his own stories, incidents piecemeal in a world antic and eerie. The rattling iconoclastic element is that of Kypris' disposition to question as much the solemnity of the state and the institutions, as that of social behaviors.

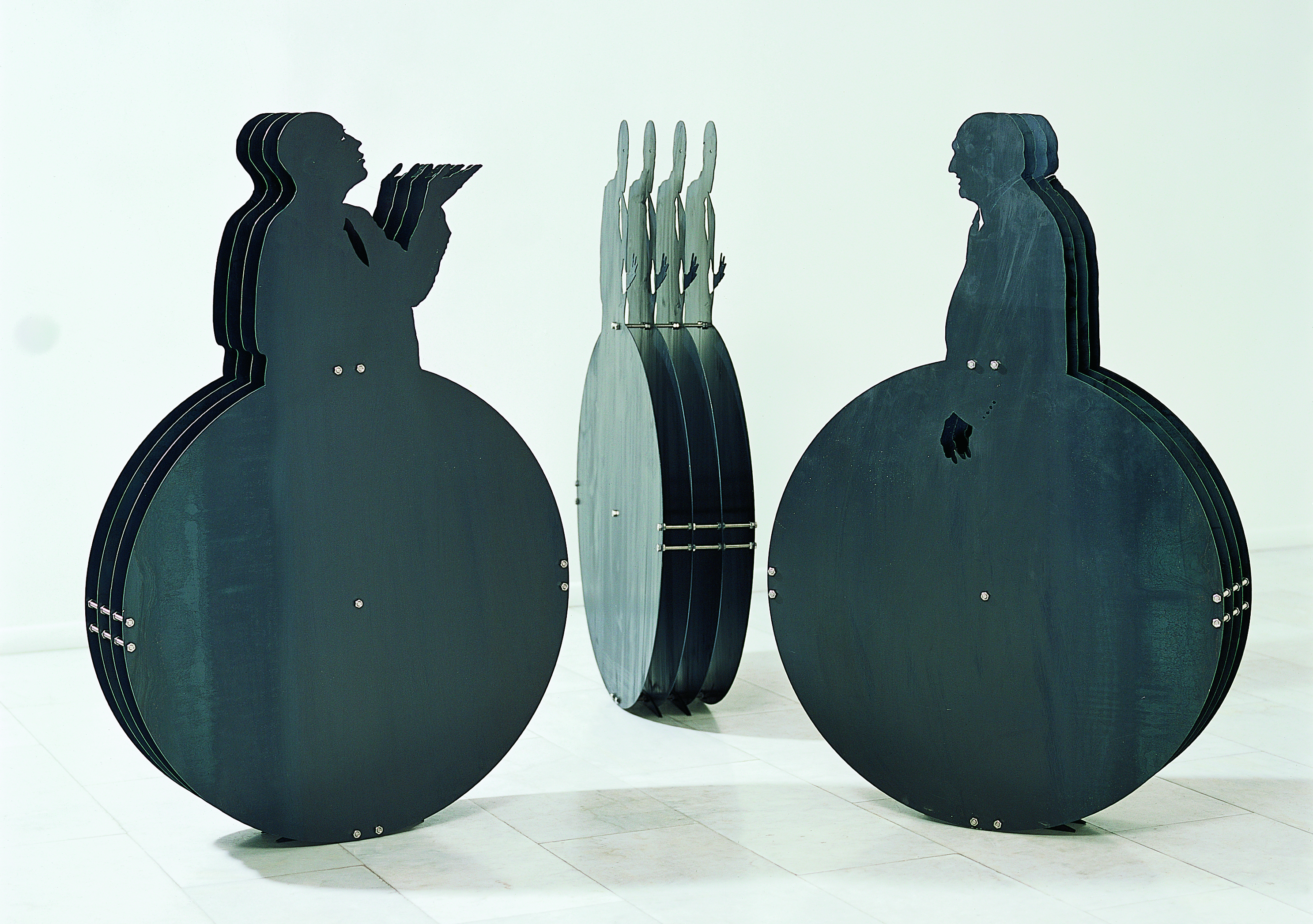
The Mandarins (2004). From the "Vanity" body of works.

In January 2016 he launched this series of works named "Iconoclastic Exercises" in a solo exhibition of the same title which was held in The House of Cyprus in Athens. Praise for the show is found in the text for the exhibition written by philosopher Dionyssis Tzarellas and in numerous articles in Greek magazines and newspapers such as LIFO, Ethnos, Kathimerini, To Vima and Proto Thema.

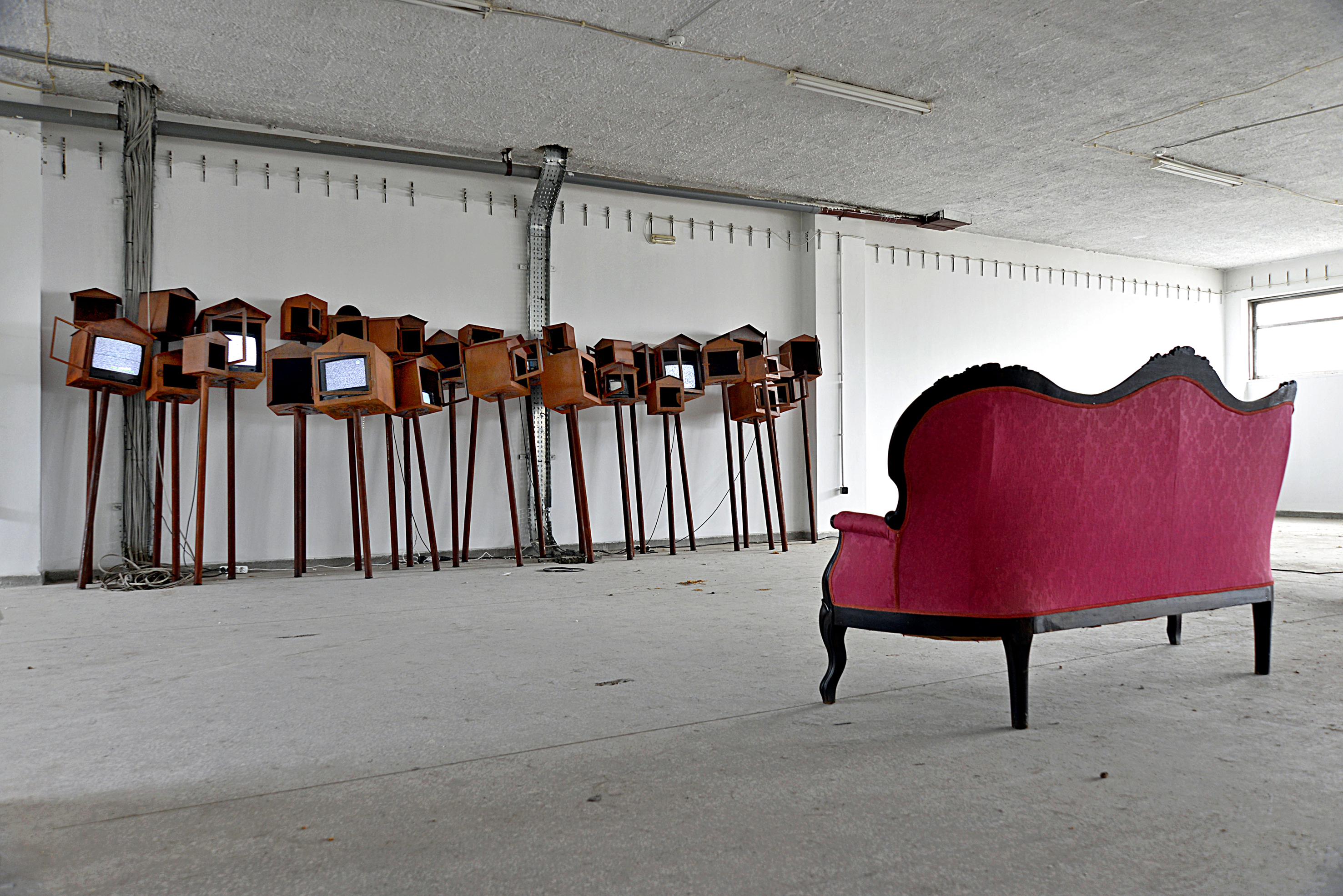
Oxidized city (2015), from the Iconoclastic Exercises body of works

=== Books ===
Kypris' work has been published a number of times in magazines, articles and books. Most notably, “Fish”, was published by Mati Publications in Santorini in 2008. Other published books include "About Cages & Flights", "Parallel Notions", "Fish conditions", and more recently "Iconoclastic Excericises"

== Exhibitions ==
=== Solo exhibitions ===
Kypris' solo exhibitions include: Gloria Gallery, Nicosia, Cyprus (1982), “Fish Conditions”, 7 Gallery, Athens, Greece (1995), Argo Gallery, Nicosia, Cyprus (1996, 1998, 2004, 2010), Cultural Centrum Covalenco, Heldrop, Eindhoven, The Netherlands (2000), Art forum Gallery, Thessaloniki, Greece (2001), Krisal Galerie, Genève, Switzerland (2001), Lovi Visual Art Gallery, Newtown, USA (2003), Scala Art Gallery, Mykonos, Greece (2009, 2011, 2013), Technochoros Art Gallery, Contemporary Istanbul, Turkey (2012), The House of Cyprus Foundation, Athens, Greece (2016).

=== Group exhibitions ===
Kypris has been part of numerous group exhibitions including "The painting space - theatricity", Benaki Museum, V. Kouloura Palace, P. Faliro (1985), "Cyprus Contemporary Art, An Itinerary", State Gallery, Nicosia (1995), "Fish", Municipal Art Center, Nicosia (1996), “Memories and Contemporary Roads of Cypriot Plastic Arts”, Thessaloniki ’97 Cultural Capital of Europe, Alaja Imaret Monument, Thessaloniki (1997), “Approaching the Greek Identity, Generations of the‘80s and the ‘90s”, Athens Municipal Gallery, Dalarna Museum, Falun, Sweden, Greek Cultural House, Stockholm, Sweden, Chateau De Vianden, Luxemburg (1999), “Greek Artists: Quests 1950-2000”, Rethymnon Center for Contemporary Art, Municipal Gallery, “L. Kanakakis”, Rethymnon (1999), “Ceramic Art, Greek-Italian Symposium”, Rocca Paolina, Perugia, Italy (1999), “Accidental Meetings”, Municipal Arts Centre, Nicosia (2005), “C’era una volta…”, MACRO La Pelanda Museum, Roma (2011), “The Object: Stories and Representations”, Evagoras Lanitis Foundation Centre, Carobmill, Limassol (2011), “Once Upon a time..game and Toy-II edition ”, MACRO TESTACCIO Museum, Rome (2013), “Re-culture 2”, 2nd International Visual Art Festival, Patra (2013).

=== Collections & Commissions ===
Kypris is represented in several Museums and Foundations including: Dimitris Pierides Collection, Athens, Greece Venetsanos Foundation, Athens, Greece G&A Mamidakis Foundation, Nicosia, Cyprus World Bank Foundation, Washington DC, USA Cyprus Bank Foundation, Nicosia, Cyprus Rethymnon Center for Contemporary Art, Rethymnon, Crete, Greece Macedonian Museum of Contemporary Art, Thessaloniki, Greece State Gallery of Contemporary Art, Nicosia, Cyprus Cyprus Olympic Committee collection, Nicosia, Cyprus Novartis Foundation, Basel, Switzerland The Emirates Centre for Strategic Studies and Research, Abu Dhabi, UAE.

== Awards & honours ==
3rd prize, International Context of Mediterranean Ceramics, Grottaglie, Italy (1997). 1st prize, National Context of Art Ceramics, Athens, Greece (1997). 1st prize, National Context of Art Ceramics, Athens, Greece (1982). 1st prize, International Competition for Sculpture, Human Right Building, Strasburg, France, (Non constructed work, 1996). 1st prize, National Competition, Installation of Sculpture, St. Pauls High School, Pafos, Cyprus (1998). 2nd prize, Courthouse, Nicosia, Cyprus (2006).
