= Marios Loizides =

Greek Cypriot visual artist

Marios Loizides (1928–1988) was a Greek Cypriot visual artist.

== Life ==
Loizides was born in Nicosia, Cyprus. he studied painting and lithography at St. Martin's School of Art, London, between 1951 and 1954, together with courses in stage and costume design. He later worked in London for a number of years as a graphic artist and designer. He moved to Greece in 1958 and, working exclusively as a painter, lived on the island of Hydra from 1961 until his death in 1988. Loizides held more than 10 solo exhibitions during his lifetime, notably in London, Brussels, Athens, and Nicosia. He also took part in a number of group exhibitions, including the Alexandria Biennale (1968).

In 2002, a large retrospective exhibition of his work was held at the State Gallery of Contemporary Cypriot Art in Nicosia. His work can be found in the State Collection of Contemporary Cypriot Art, in the Collection of the National Gallery of Greece in Athens, in the collection of the Vorres Museum, Greece, as well as in several private collections throughout Europe and North America.

Loizides' work falls into the category of geometrical abstract art. His artistic aim was to present not the world of the senses but rather the deeper immanent unity of the universe, hence his visionary approach to art.

Marios Loizides with pet donkey "Saturday", circa. 1963.
