= Stelios Votsis =

Stelios Votsis (Greek: Στέλιος Βότσης; 21 November 1929 – 9 November 2012) was a Cypriot artist, one of the leading figures of modern art on the island, a co-founder of the Cyprus Chamber of Fine Arts and its one-time president. His style was best characterized as 'structural abstraction'; he worked in painting and drawing.

== Early life and education ==
Born in Larnaca, he demonstrated an aptitude for painting early on and staged exhibitions while still a high-school student at the Pancypriot Commercial School. Upon graduation, he travelled to post-war England in 1949 to pursue his dream of studying art. His studies took him to Saint Martin's School of Art, Sir John Cass College, the Royal Academy of Fine Arts and the Slade School of Art. As his friend the late Stass Paraskos noted: "At the Slade, he was taught by William Coldstream, and in his early work Votsis was influenced by the Euston Road School, a group of leftwing realist artists including Coldstream". In his second year at the Slade, he won first prize in a university-wide drawing competition but declined the prize, explaining that he did not deem his work deserving. Those same exacting standards led him to destroy almost all the paintings he produced during this period. After enduring financial hardship and even a bout of tuberculosis, he graduated from the Slade in 1955.

== Career ==
He returned to Cyprus the same year and co-founded the Cyprus Chamber of Fine Arts. Together with a number of other pioneering artists he was instrumental in introducing modern art to Cyprus. He represented the island nation on the international stage in various exhibitions including:

- The Venice Biennale
- The Biennale of Alexandria
- The Triennale of India
- The São Paulo Biennial
- The Biennial of Graphic Arts in Buenos Aires-Argentina
- The International Exhibition of New Artists in New York
- The International Biennial of Graphic Arts in Fredrikstad Norway
- The International Exhibition of Graphic Arts in Frechen Germany
- The International Exhibition of Graphic Arts (Gallery Du Bois) in Pennsylvania
- The Brussels Biennale

His paintings can be found in a number of collections including the National Gallery of Greece, the Greek Ministry of Culture, the Vorres Museum, the Presidential Palace of Cyprus and other public and private collections in Cyprus, Greece and beyond. Notable among the work completed prior to his death is his collaboration with the artist Stass Paraskos. Working on a single canvas but maintaining their respective styles, these paintings are known as the 'pomishiarika' (Cypriot dialect for 'jointly owned'), although the art historian Michael Paraskos has described them as essentially anarchist paintings in which the 'dictatorship' of the single artist over the canvas is replaced by a democratic space. Some of these joint works were put on display in Nicosia 2007, in an exhibition inaugurated by the British art historian Norbert Lynton.

Votsis was awarded the Ruskin prize in drawing and the bronze medal in the European prize for painting contest which was held in Ostend-Belgium in 1973. For his contributions to the culture of Cyprus he was awarded an Annual Honorary Grant by the Ministry of Education and Culture of the Republic of Cyprus.
