= Niki Marangou =

- Born: 1948; Limassol, Cyprus
- Died: 7 February 2013 (aged 65); Fayoum, Egypt
- Notable work: Divan
- Awards: Cavafy award poetry prize of Athens Academy
- Website: Website

Niki Marangou (1948 – 7 February 2013) was a Greek Cypriot author, poet, and painter.

== Early life and education ==
Marangou was born in Limassol, Cyprus, in 1948. She studied sociology in West Berlin, Germany, from 1965 to 1970.

== Career ==
After graduation, Marangou worked as a dramaturge at the Cyprus Theatre Organisation. She also ran a bookshop in Nicosia. She was the author of books of prose, poetry and children's fairy tales. She was also a painter and had seven solo exhibitions. Her first solo exhibition was in 1975. She was a member of the Hellenic Authors Society and the Cyprus Writers Association.

Some of her books were translated into German and Spanish.

=== Awards ===
Marangou received different awards. In 1998, she was awarded the Cavafy prize for poetry in Alexandria. In 2006, she was awarded the poetry prize of the Athens Academy for her book Divan. In 2007 her novel The Demon of Lust was described as one of the ten best Greek short story books by literature magazine Diavaso Rewards. She was given the Konstantin-Kavafis Prize for Poetry in 2008.

== Death ==
Marangou died in Fayoum, Egypt, on 7 February 2013 in a car crash while travelling. She was 65.

== Book ==
Niki Marangou: Von Famagusta nach Wien. Die Geschichte eines Arztes aus Zypern, übers. a. d. Griechischen v. Martin Scharnhorst, 120 S., ISBN 978-3-902585-08-0, Klagenfurt, Kitab, 2008
