= Katy Stephanides =

Cypriot artist

- Καίτη Φασουλιώτου
- Fasouliotis, taken in 1961
- Born: Katy Fasouliotis; 1925; Limassol, Cyprus
- Died: 2012 (aged 86–87)
- Other names: Kaiti Fasouliotou-Stephanides, Kaiti Stefanidou, Katie Stephanides, Katy Fasouliotis-Stephanides, Katy Phasouliotis Stephanides
- Occupation: painter

Katy Stephanides (Greek: Καίτη Φασουλιώτου-Στεφανίδου; 1925 – 24 March 2012) was one of the leading artists in Cypriot modernist movement in the second half of the 20th century and the first decade of the 21st century. She held her first solo exhibition in 1972 featuring abstract geometric paintings and continued exhibiting through 2003. She has works in the collections of the Byzantine Museum of the Archbishop Makarios III, the Loukia and Michalakis Zambelas Art Museum, the Municipal Art Gallery of Limassol and the State Gallery of Contemporary Cypriot Art.

== Early life ==
Katy Fasouliotis was born in 1925 in Limassol, Cyprus. She was the daughter of Tasoula and Panos Fasouliotis. Her father was the editor of the Observer (Paratiritis) newspaper and she was the niece of George Fasouliotis, a cartoonist at the newspaper The Laugh (To Gelio). From a young age, she liked to draw and was encouraged to develop her talents. Between 1948 and 1955, she studied at the Athens School of Fine Arts taking painting courses with Umbertos Argyros and Yiannis Moralis and studying art history with Pandelis Prevelakis. Upon her graduation, Fasouliotis moved to London to take classes at the Saint Martin's School of Art and study the art in museums and galleries in both London and Paris until 1960.

== Career ==
Upon completing her education, Stephanides returned to Cyprus in 1961 and began a career as a secondary school art teacher, instructing for the next twenty-five years. That same year, she participated in an exhibition organized by the magazine Κυπριακά Χρονικά (Cypriot Chronicles) called "Cypriot Artists" and held in Athens. Her works in this early stage of her career reflected the early modern developments in international art in the 1950s and 1960s, showing cubist influences by such artists as Paul Cézanne, André Lhote, and Kazimir Malevich. In the mid-1960s, she married the writer and painter Tasos Stephanides, with whom she had two children, Panos, who became a painter and Marina, later a writer. Over the next decade, she participated in numerous local and international exhibits including the 1963 Biennale of the Alexandria Museum of Fine Arts; 1970 Commonwealth Institute exhibition Contemporary Cypriot Art, which was shown in Edinburgh and London; and the 1971 São Paulo Art Biennial in Brazil. In 1972, Stephanides held her first solo exhibit at the Acropolis Gallery, in Nicosia. most of the works presented were geometric abstractions which showed the influence of such painters as Naum Gabo, Piet Mondrian and Sophie Taeuber-Arp, but other pieces clearly embraced the Op art and Minimalism movements of the 1960s. She was interested in moving away from representing specific objects or nature, instead exploring essence of movement and form through space by the exploration of color, shape, and texture.

In 1974, after the Cypriot coup d'état Stephanides style changed and she began introducing references to Greek history into her works as a political statement. Particularly concerned about how war impacts women, her works began to explore stylized female forms and isolation, in a more expressionistic manner. Using symbolism in her paintings, such as representations of Aphrodite and the mountains of Pentadaktylos, she used Greek references to both reference the detachment and separation from Cyprus' Hellenistic past and as commentary on the political events that were occurring in the period. In 1978, Stephanides held her second solo show at Zygos Gallery in Nicosia, which presented both some of her older works and previous style, as well as a series entitled "The Depth of the World" which showed her new focus on unidentified female figures and the limits imposed upon humans by world events. In her third solo exhibition, held in 1982, Stephanides' art embraces Surrealism and Pop Art. Throughout the 1980s, she continued to explore the idea of limits placed on women in society, using symbols like the telephone or traffic signs to communicate boundaries. By the time of her 4th solo exhibition in 1988, held at Nicosia's Apocalypse Gallery, her works had moved to an exploration of color, form, and movement with an expressionistic fluidity in their composition.

Stephanides work returned to pure abstraction in her 5th solo exhibit held at the Morfi Gallery in Limassol and even more so in her 6th solo showing at the Apocalypse Gallery, in which works focused on smooth vivid colors in flat space devoid of depth and volume. In her 1998 exhibition at the Apocalypse Gallery, Stephanides introduced thematic elements from traditional handworks, such as tapestry and embroidery. Blurring the lines between fine art and folk art, she used motifs to represent femininity. In 2003, in an exhibit Metamorphoses, hosted at the Argo Gallery in Nicosia, she expanded on these themes, bringing in references to folklore and spirituality, though in a thoroughly modern presentation strictly balancing the organization and vertical development in vivid colors on a flat surface lacking perspective of a third dimension.

== Death and legacy ==
Stephanides died on 24 March 2012. She is remembered as one of the leading figures of the 20th century, who developed modern art in Cyprus. The art historian Eleni Nikita, characterized Stephanides place as a pioneer, stating that her work "created a bridge for Cypriot art to reach the point it is at today". She has works in the collections of the Byzantine Museum of the Archbishop Makarios III, the Loukia and Michalakis Zambelas Art Museum, the Municipal Art Gallery of Limassol and the State Gallery of Contemporary Cypriot Art. In 2013, the Apocalypse Gallery hosted Descendance, an exhibition which featured previously unexhibited works by Stephanides, her husband, Tasos, and her son, Panos.
