= Hellenic Air Force Academy =

Military academy in Greece

- Σχολή Ικάρων
- Hellenic Air Force Academy logo, with its official emblem in the centre
- Other names: Icarus School
- Motto: Άμμες δε γ' εσσόμεθα πολλώ κάρρονες
- Motto in English: We shall become much better than you
- Type: Service academy
- Established: 1931
- Parent institution: Hellenic Air Force
- Commander: Major General Konstantinos Karamesinis
- Location: Decelea, Tatoi, Greece
- Website: hafa.haf.gr/en/

The Hellenic Air Force Academy (Greek: Σχολή Ικάρων, abbr. ΣΙ (SI)) is a military academy responsible for supplying the Hellenic Air Force with military pilots, aeronautical engineers, air traffic and air defence controllers. The first Greek institution for aviation training was founded in 1919 as the Military Academy of Aviation (Στρατιωτική Σχολή Αεροπλοΐας) in Thessaloniki. In 1931 the Air Force School was founded in Tatoi, Athens. In 1967 it took the unofficial name Icarus School in reference to the figure of Icarus from ancient Greek mythology. The figure of Icarus forms the centrepiece of the academy's badge.

The Hellenic Air Force Academy is a member of the European Air Force Academies (EUAFA).

== History ==
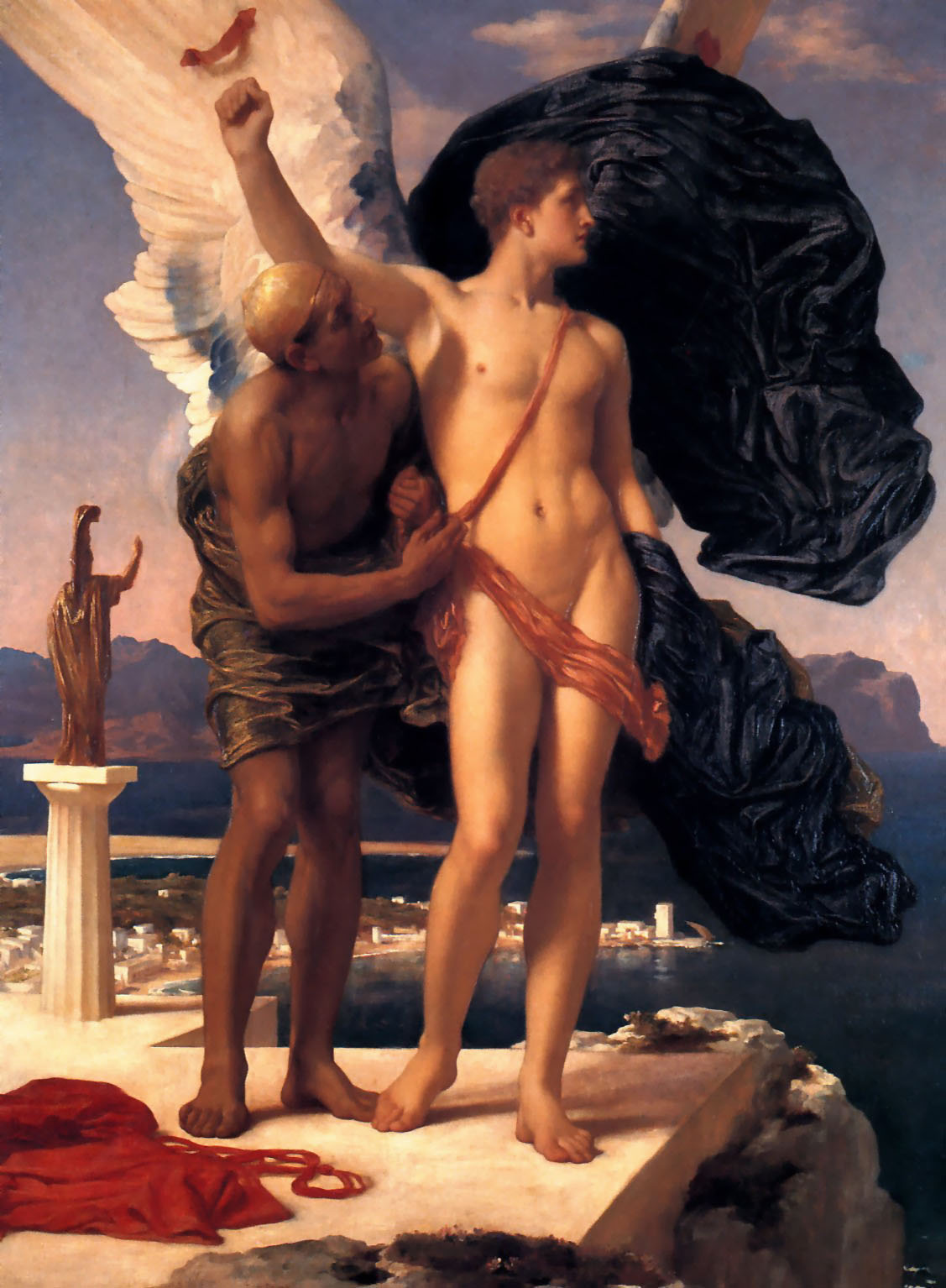
Icarus and Daedalus by Frederic Leighton

Many decades have passed since the founding of the Air Force Academy. Since then, from the academy have graduated at least 2600 pilots, 1200 aircraft engineers and other specializations according to the Air Force needs.

The modern Icarus School is the successor of the Air Force School, founded in 1931 at the airport of Dekeleia, Tatoi in Athens.

=== 1930s ===
The first 11 trainees entered the academy on 2 November 1931 and their training was initially performed by Avro 621-Tutor and Avro 626-Prefect type aircraft. Training in the academy was common for both the Air Force and the Navy Aviation. The academy could be attended only by high school graduates and attendance was for 3 years.

In 1935 a second branch was introduced in the academy, the branch of "Junior Lieutenant Pilots", and attendance was for 2 years. In 1938 a third branch was introduced, that of Aircraft Engineers. Most graduates of those years gave their life in the air battles of World War II, like 2nd Lieutenant Marinos Mitralexis.

=== 1940s ===
In October 1940 the academy was transferred to the city of Argos. In April 1941, due to the German invasion of Greece, the academy was again transferred to the Middle East and later on to Southern Rhodesia, where it operated normally from September 1941 until the summer of 1946. Training of Greek pilots during the war was performed by British units in Middle East and Southern Rhodesia.

In March 1947 the academy returned to Dekeleia, Tatoi. Normal operation of the academy began in October 1947, when the first postgraduates from England were accepted. The initial structure of the Royal Hellenic Air Force Academy was done according to the structure of the Royal Air Force academies of Southern Rhodesia. The same goes for the flight training system, which was exactly the same with the one followed in the Southern Rhodesia academies.

=== 1950s ===
In 1950, the first RHAF pilot squadron returned from the United States, where it had been trained. Since then, flight education was influenced from the American educational system. In 1952 starts a new era for the Air Force Academy, the era of jets. Training of pilots in jet aircraft started in 1953. That same year the whole structure of the academy was revised and organised according to a typical U.S. fighter wing and it was renamed to 121 Training Wing (121 Πτερυγα Εκπαίδευσης Αέρος - 121 ΠΕΑ). One year earlier, the Training Centre of Conscript Pilots had been founded, following British and U.S. prototypes and until September 1958, eight rows of conscript pilots had been trained.

In 1958 the Air Force Academy went under a total renovation program and was re-established in new building installations, in which it operates since then. With this re-establishment, several new laboratories are being founded and equipped.

=== 1960s – present ===
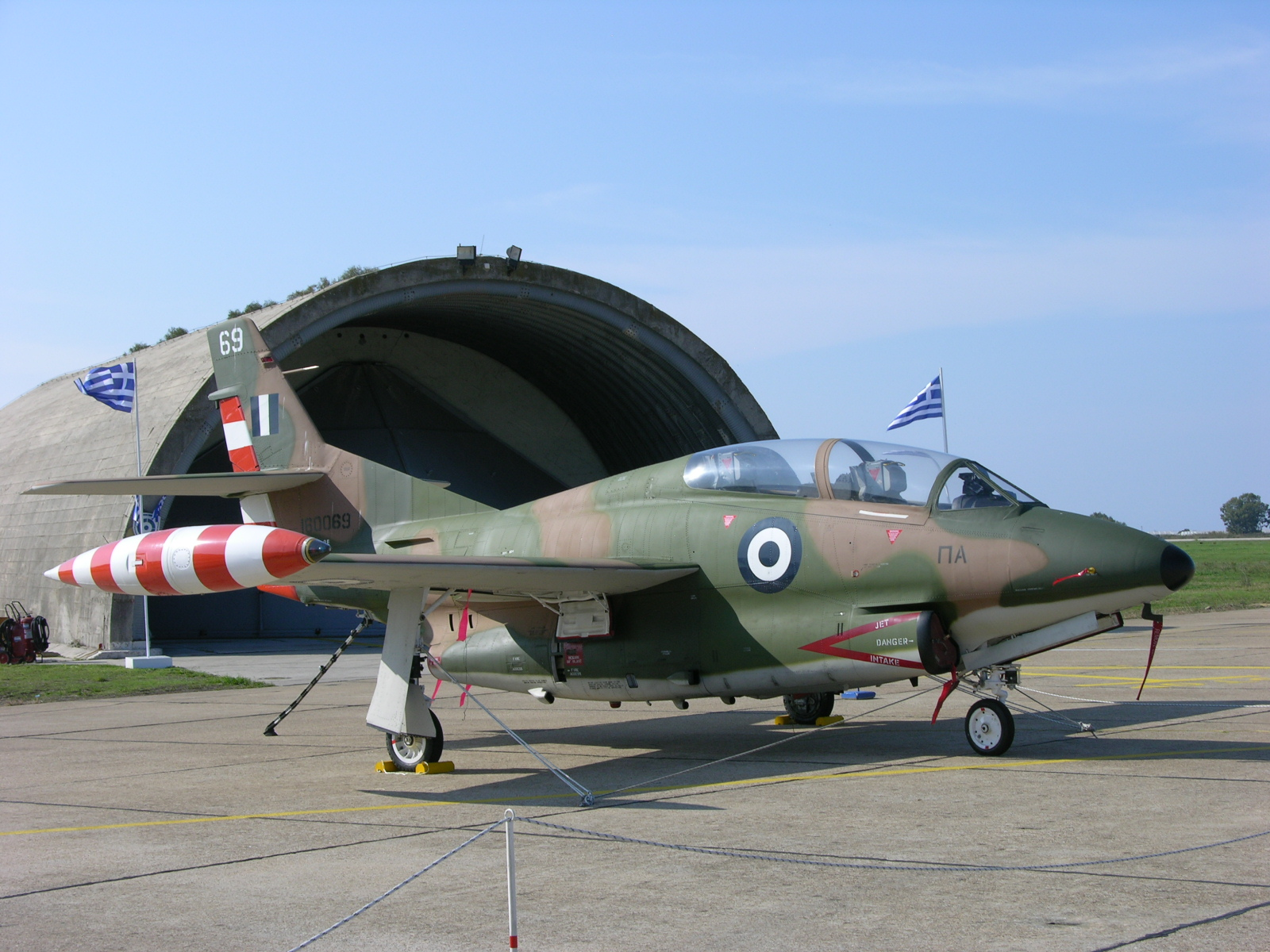
Hellenic Air Force Academy T-2E Buckeye, used for advanced jet training.

In 1962 the academy accepted the first foreign students from Jordan, due to the good relations between King Hussein of Jordan and King Constantine II of Greece then. In the years that follow, pilots from many African and Middle-East countries have graduated and have returned to work in the air forces of their countries and other higher posts up to Prime Ministers. In 1964 the academy was turned to a Highest Education Institution (ΑΕΙ, "University"), equal to all other universities in Greece. Until 1966, attendance was for 3 years. Since 1967 until today, attendance is for 4 years. That same year the academy took its present name (Icarus Air Force Academy). In 1974 the academy began an educational reform program, increasing 3 hours of theoretical lessons to 10.

Since 1991 the Hellenic Air Force Academy accepts female engineer students and since 2000, female pilot students as happens with the other two branches of the Hellenic Armed Forces (female "Arms" students and female combatants respectively).

In 2005, the Hellenic Air Force Academy began reform of its facilities, equipment and academic curriculum. New facilities were built and old ones were renovated, while works ended in 2008, year in which the new curriculum and re-organisation of the academy took effect. In addition, the old and tired "Rockwell T-2 Buckeye" was scheduled to be replaced, after 30 years of service, by a new advanced trainer that would provide adequate training for entering the 5th generation fighters era. These plans were delayed due to the Greek economic crisis (2009-2018) and the aircraft is still operational as of 2019.

Initially, the most likely candidates for a new advanced training aircraft were the Boeing T-45 Goshawk (manufactured by Boeing and BAE Systems), the KAI T-50 Golden Eagle from South Korea, the Aero Vodochody L-159 ALCA from Czech Republic, the British made Hawk Mk127 LIFT and the Italian Aermacchi M-346 Advanced Trainer (The Hellenic Aerospace Industry -EAB- had signed a "Memorandum of Understanding" with Aermacchi since summer 2006). However this list inevitably came under reconsideration due to the postponement of the program.

== Flight training ==
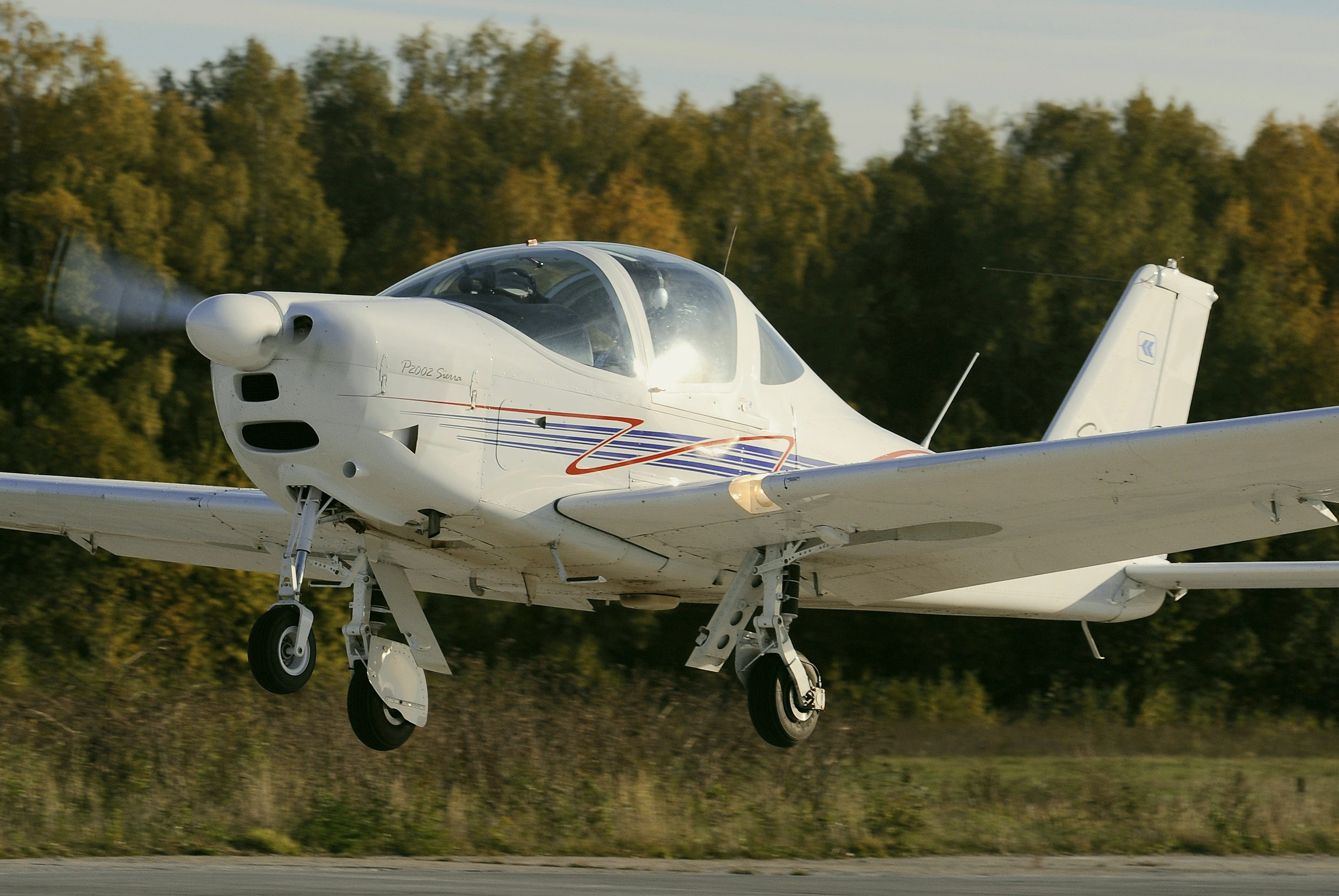
The Tecnam P2002 Sierra, used for initial training (screening), after replacing the Cessna T-41 Mescalero in 2018.

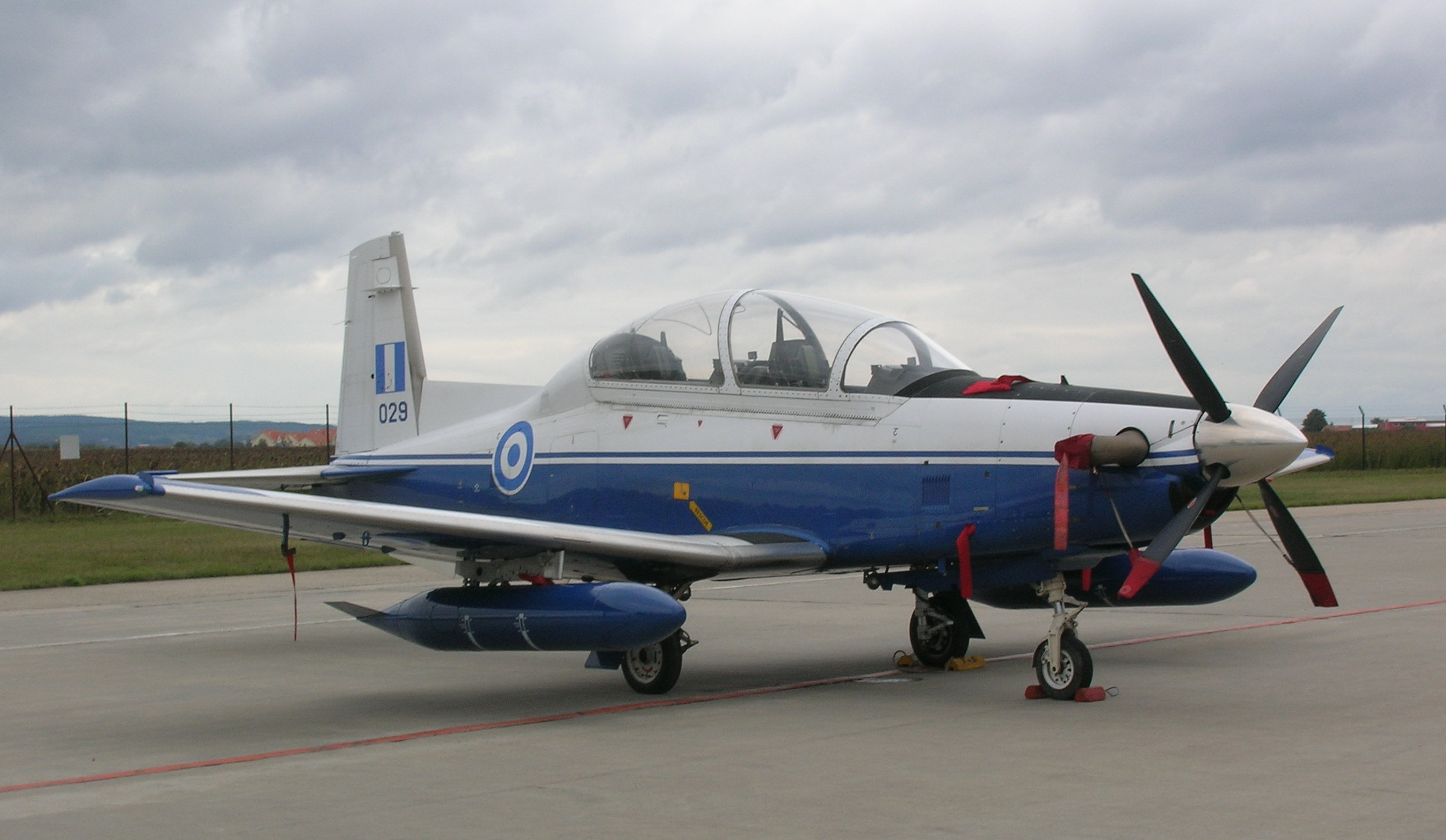
T-6A Texan II of the Hellenic Air Force Academy, used for 2nd year training.

The training aircraft operated by the Hellenic Air Force Academy are the Tecnam P2002 Sierra that replaced the T-41D Mescalero (the military version of the Cessna 172 Skyhawk) for basic flight training, the Beechcraft T-6 Texan II for intermediate training and the Rockwell T-2 Buckeye used for intermediate and advanced jet training. The HAF Academy also utilises two Dassault Mirage 2000 as type conversion trainers.

From the first year in the academy, the trainees have direct contact with the aircraft and the ideal of flying. The freshmen conduct 16 flights with initial trainer aircraft, completing 19 flight hours per student. During the 2nd year of training the trainees conduct 48 flights with the T-6 Texan II aircraft, completing 60 flight hours per student, while during the 3rd year, the flights upgrade to 54 and the flight hours to 70 per student.

With a total 150 flight hours (on training aircraft) to their flight logs, the pilots graduate from the academy with the rank of Anthiposminagos (Pilot Officer equivalent to 2nd Lieutenant). Training continues to their appointed flight wings on the aircraft type operated by each wing. As pointed out to the magazine "Defence Matters" (vol.248, May 2007) by the commander of the Academy Air Vice-Marshal Constantinos Kalamatas, according to statistical facts "8 out of 10 graduates take the fighter pilot specialization, while 60% of all students that take this specialization, graduate". These numbers are considered satisfactory.

The graduates who have the "pilot" specialization (ranked Pilot Officers) can reach the highest rank in the chain of command, that of Air Chief Marshal (equivalent to General or Admiral), the rank awarded only when the Defence General Staff is headed by an Air Force officer. The Commander of the Air Force General Staff is always a pilot. Engineer Officers and Air-Defence Controller Officers can only climb to the rank of Air Marshal (equivalent to Lt. General or Vice Admiral).

== Military training ==
The military training program of students is under the supervision of the Icarus Squadron (Σμηναρχία Ικάρων).

It begins with the constant informing of students on military matters because they have complete lack of military experience in their first year and it concludes when the students become military officers.

In general, the military training program has the goal of promoting discipline, self-esteem and increased confidence to the student's skills as a future pilot and military officer. In the last two years of training, the program gives emphasis in teaching responsibility and skills of being a leader and it also focuses to the individual virtues of each student. It also provides practical information on the structure and operation of the Hellenic Air Force.

== Other units of Air Training Command ==
- 124 Basic Training Wing (124 Πτέρυγα Βασικής Εκπαίδευσης), located in Tripoli, Arcadia.
  - 1st New Recruits Training Squadron (1η Mοίρα Εκπαίδευσης Νεοσυλλέκτων)
  - 2nd New Recruits Training Squadron (2η Mοίρα Εκπαίδευσης Νεοσυλλέκτων)
  - 3rd New Recruits Training Squadron (3η Mοίρα Εκπαίδευσης Νεοσυλλέκτων)
  - Local Defense Training Squadron (Mοίρα Εκπαίδευσης Τοπικής Άμυνας)
- 120 Air Training Wing (120 Πτέρυγα Εκπαίδευσης Αέρος), located in Kalamata, Messinia.
  - 361 Air Training Squadron (361 Μοίρα Εκπαίδευσης Αέρος)
  - 362 Air Training Squadron (362 Μοίρα Εκπαίδευσης Αέρος)
  - 363 Air Training Squadron (363 Μοίρα Εκπαίδευσης Αέρος)
  - 364 Air Training Squadron (364 Μοίρα Εκπαίδευσης Αέρος)
  - T-6A Aircraft Maintenance Squadron (Μοίρα Συντήρησης Αεροσκαφών Τ-6Α)
  - Sea Survival Training School / S.S.T.S. (Σχολείο Εκπαίδευσης Θαλάσσιας Επιβίωσης / Σ.Ε.Θ.Ε.)
  - International Flight Training Center / IFTC (Διεθνές Εκπαιδευτικό Κέντρο Πτήσεων)
- 123 Technical Training Wing (123 Πτέρυγα Τεχνικής Εκπαίδευσης), located in Decelea, Tatoi.
  - Air Defense Staff Training Center (Κέντρο Εκπαίδευσης Προσωπικού Αεράμυνας / Κ.Ε.Π.Α.)
  - 128 Squadron of Communications Training and Avionics (128 Σμηναρχία Εκπαίδευσης Τηλεπικοινωνιών και Ηλεκτρονικών / Σ.Ε.Τ.Η.), located in Kavouri, Athens
  - Guards - Dog Training Centre (Κέντρο Εκπαίδευσης Φρουρών - Σκύλων), located in Koropi, Attica

== Air Training Command aircraft inventory ==
Aircraft	Origin	Versions	In service	Role
Tecnam P2002 Sierra	Italy	P-2002JF	12	primary training
Beechcraft T-6 Texan II	United States	T-6A	45	intermediate training
Rockwell T-2 Buckeye	United States	T-2C T-2E	39	advanced training
Dassault Mirage 2000	France	2000EG	2	conversion training

== See also ==
- Hellenic Air Force officer rank insignia
