= Konstantinos Floros =

Greek army officer

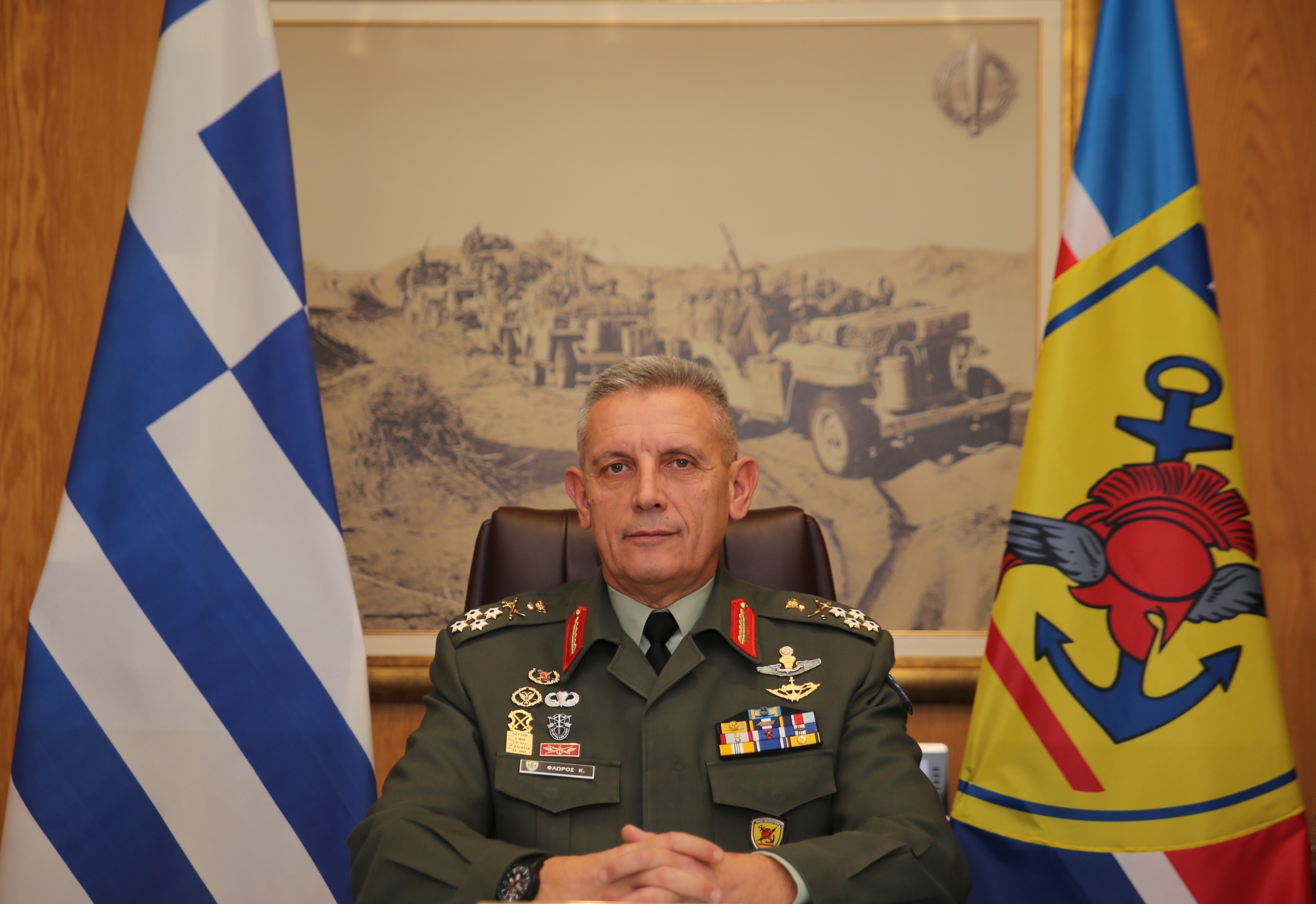
- General Konstantinos Floros
- Born: 24 June 1961 (age 64); Chalcis, Greece
- Allegiance: Greece
- Branch: Hellenic Army
- Service years: 1979−2024
- Rank: General
- Commands: Chief of the Hellenic National Defence General Staff; Deputy Chief of the HNDGS; 13th Special Operations Command; 16th Mechanized Infantry Division; VII Amphibious Raider Squadron

General Konstantinos Floros (Greek: Κωνσταντίνος Φλώρος; born June 24, 1961) is a Greek army officer who served as Chief of the Hellenic National Defence General Staff in 2020–2024.

== Biography ==
Konstantinos Floros was born at Chalkida on 24 June 1961. In 1979–1983 he attended the Hellenic Army Academy, graduating as an infantry second lieutenant.

He then served as platoon leader in the Non Commissioned Officers Army Academy, and company commander in Samos Island. He entered the army special forces in 1986, serving successively in the 575th Marines Battalion, the 3rd Special National Guard Detachment, and the 2nd Paratroopers Squadron. During this time, apart from the relevant army schools, he also completed courses in the Hellenic Navy's elite Underwater Demolition Unit in 1989, and the US Army's John F. Kennedy Special Warfare Center and School in 1992, where he distinguished himself as the best foreign student of his cohort.

In 1999, he attended the Supreme War School, and after graduation was posted to the 13th Amphibious Raiders Regiment. After serving as a staff officer in the Special Forces Directorate of the Hellenic Army General Staff in 2003–2004, he was appointed commander of the elite VII Amphibious Raider Squadron. In 2005–2008 he served in the Greek permanent representation to the Supreme Headquarters Allied Powers Europe. After completing courses in the National Defence School in 2008, he became head of the Special Operations Planning Section in the Hellenic National Defence General Staff Until summer 2011, when he was appointed chief of staff of the 16th Mechanized Infantry Division.

Promoted to brigadier general, he assumed command of the 13th Special Operations Command in 2012, before moving to the Army General Staff as head of the Operations Directorate in March 2014. He remained at this post for a year, when he was promoted to major general and moved again to the HNDGS as director of the I (Operations) Branch. From February 2016 he also assumed the lead coordinating role in the HNDGS's involvement in the European migrant crisis. In January 2017, the Government Council for Foreign Affairs and Defence (KYSEA) appointed him chief of staff of the HNDGS, but in March of the same year he was promoted to Deputy Chief and the rank of lieutenant general.

On 17 January 2020, KYSEA selected him as Chief of the HNDGS in succession to Christodoulou, promoting him to full general.

General Floros is married with two daughters. He speaks English, and has a post-graduate degree on "Strategic Analysis and Crisis Management and Resolution" from the University of Aberdeen, and on "International Relations and Strategic Studies" from Panteion University.

== Awards ==
In addition to the Greek medals appropriate to his rank, he has been awarded the NATO Medal for the former Yugoslavia, the Order of King Abdulaziz of the Excellent Class in May 2021, the medal of a Commander of the Legion of Honour from the French Republic on 20 October 2021, and in November 2021 the Serge Lazareff Prize.

In July 2022, he received the Medal of the United States Special Operations Command from General Richard D. Clarke, Commander of the Special Operations Forces of the United States of America.

On 12 January 2024 he was replaced by General Dimitrios Choupis, formerly head of the Special Warfare Command established under Floros.

Military offices
Preceded by Admiral Evangelos Apostolakis	Chief of the Hellenic National Defence General Staff (acting); 14–25 January 2019	Succeeded by Air Chief Marshal Christos Christodoulou
Preceded by Air Chief Marshal Christos Christodoulou	Chief of the Hellenic National Defence General Staff; 17 January 2020 – 12 January 2024	Succeeded by General Dimitrios Choupis
