= Panos Kammenos =

Greek politician

- Πάνος Καμμένος
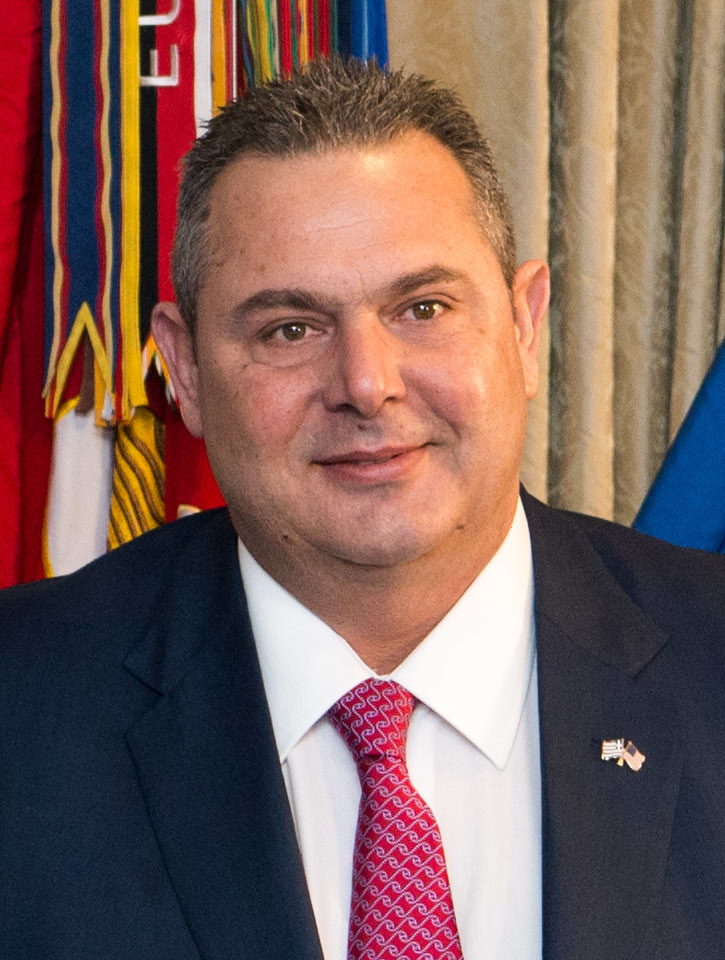
- Kammenos in 2017

Minister of National Defence
- In office 23 September 2015 – 15 January 2019
- Prime Minister: Alexis Tsipras
- Preceded by: Ioannis Giangos
- Succeeded by: Evangelos Apostolakis
- In office 27 January 2015 – 28 August 2015
- Prime Minister: Alexis Tsipras
- Preceded by: Nikos Dendias
- Succeeded by: Ioannis Giangos

President of Independent Greeks
- In office 24 February 2012 – 2020
- Preceded by: Position established
- Succeeded by: Position abolished

Member of the Hellenic Parliament
- In office 10 October 1993 – 11 June 2019
- Constituency: Athens B

Personal details
- Born: 12 May 1965 (age 61) Athens, Greece
- Party: New Democracy (Before 2012); Independent Greeks (2012–2020)
- Spouse: Eleni Tzouli
- Children: 4
- Education: University of Lyon

Panagiotis "Panos" Kammenos (Greek: Παναγιώτης "Πάνος" Καμμένος, pronounced [panaˈʝotis ˈpanos kaˈmenos]; born 12 May 1965) is a Greek politician and the founder of the right-wing party Independent Greeks, which formed the governing coalition of the Hellenic Parliament with the Syriza Party after Kammenos met with Prime Minister Alexis Tsipras, on 26 January 2015.

He was named Greece's Minister of National Defence on 27 January 2015. He served until 20 August 2015, when the Syriza-ANEL coalition resigned, and continued as a lame duck until 28 August, when he was succeeded by the interim Minister, Ioannis Giangos. He again became Minister of National Defence on 23 September 2015 when the Syriza-ANEL coalition was re-created following the election of 20 September 2015.

== Early life and career ==
Kammenos was born in Athens, Greece. He studied economics and psychology at the University of Lyon Business Administration School of Managers. In 1993, he was first elected Member of Parliament in the New Democracy in the Second District of Athens.

== Independent Greeks party ==
On 24 February 2012, through his personal social networking sites, Kammenos announced the establishment of the new party called "Independent Greeks (ANEL)" and published the Declaration. Yiannis Manolis directly expressed its intention to join the new party format. He expressed support for Elena Kountoura, Panagiotis Melas and other MPs.

He advocated for eliminating a large part of Greece's debt, which was equivalent to 175 per cent of the country's gross domestic product.

Kammenos and the Independent Greeks took a hardline stance against illegal immigration into Greece.

The Independent Greeks and Kammenos are Eurosceptics. He walked the halls of the Greek Parliament wearing a T-shirt that said, "Greece is not for sale."

=== 2015 elections ===
With 3.7% of votes won in the snap elections, Independent Greeks, the junior coalition partner in Tsipras's last government, entered the parliament. Panos Kammenos formed a government with Tsipras and Syriza. As a minister of Defence, in 2015, he refounded after years the Mixed Groups of Reconstruction Machines (MOMA).

== Institute of Geopolitical Studies and lobbying for Russia ==
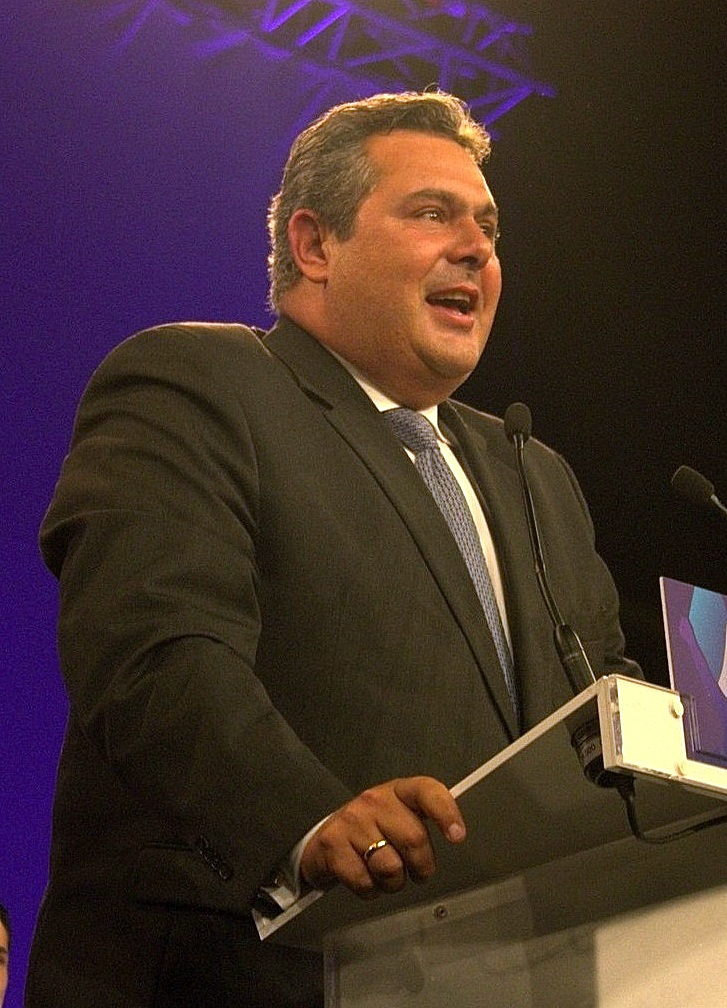
Panos Kammemos in 2013

Kammenos co-founded with his friend, University of Thrace professor Filippos Tsalidis, Athens-based Institute of Geopolitical Studies. In November 2014, the Institute signed a "memorandum of understanding" with the Russian Institute for Strategic Studies (RISI). RISI had been part of Russia's Foreign Intelligence Service (SVR), Russia′s primary overseas espionage agency, until it was brought under the office of the Russian president in 2009. Since January 2017, RISI has been headed by the ex-chief of the SVR, Mikhail Fradkov.

In December 2019, speaking to a conference held by the Institute, Panos Kammenos effectively admitted that he had blackmailed the primate of the Church of Greece, Archbishop Ieronymos II, on behalf of Russia by transmitting Russia′s threat to withdraw Russia′s alleged guarantees to Greece to preclude occupation by Turkey of Greek islands such as Kastellorizo, Lemnos and others in the Eastern Aegean in the event that the Church of Greece recognised the Church of Ukraine.

== Awards ==
He has been honored with the Grand Cross of Merit from the Primate of the Czech and Slovak Orthodox Church, the Medal of Honor Patriarchate of Jerusalem and the Order of Knight of the National Order of Merit by the President of France Nicolas Sarkozy. In 2007, he was appointed Deputy Minister of Mercantile Marine, Aegean and Island Policy in the government of Kostas Karamanlis, Minister and politician where the head was Georgios Voulgarakis. He was sometimes involved as an expert mediator and an official observer in elections in foreign countries.

== Political positions and controversies ==
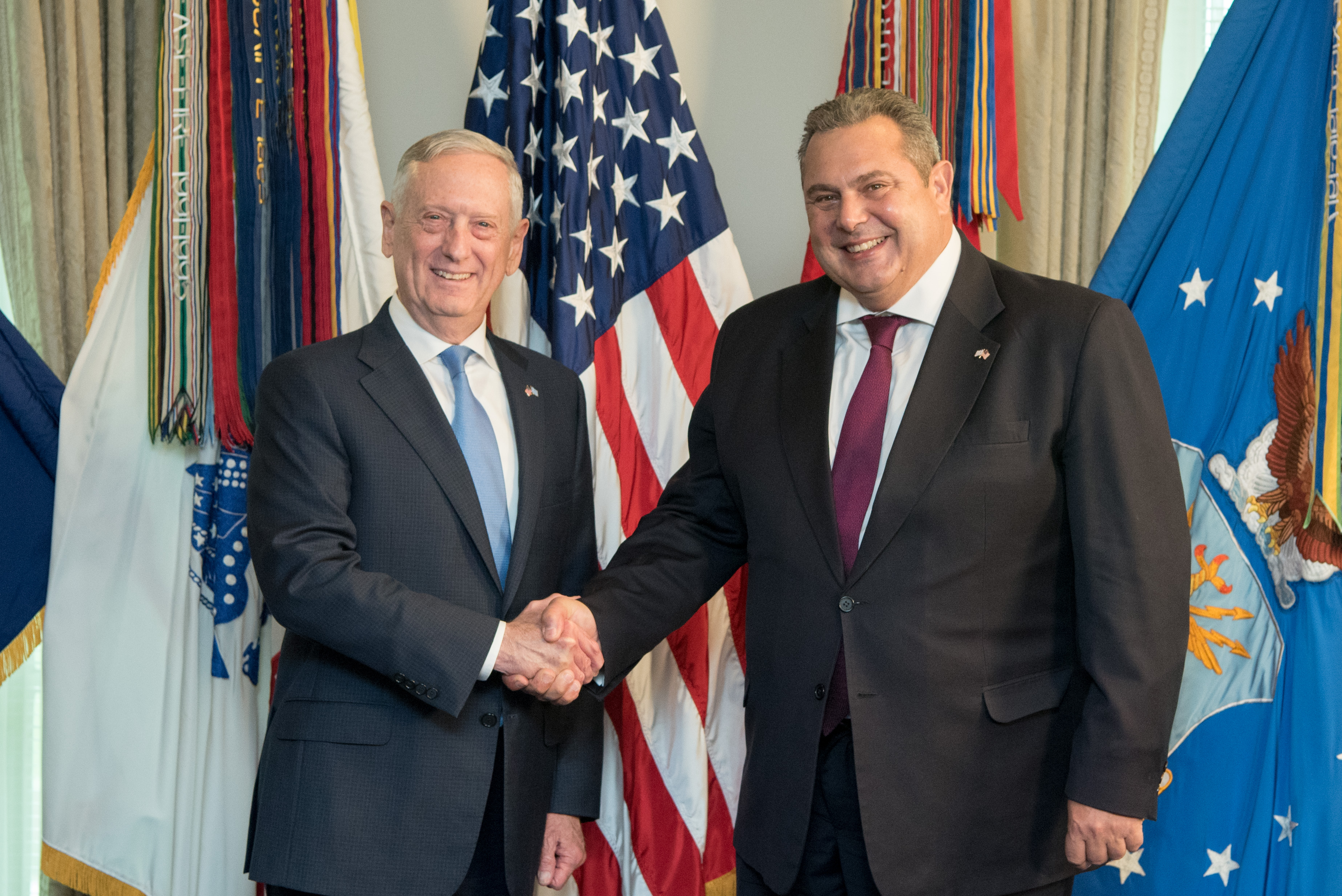
Kammenos with United States Secretary of Defense James Mattis on 9 October 2018

Kammenos accused the former Prime Minister of Greece George Papandreou of treason. He said that the Hellenic Postbank, a public banking arm of the Greek government, oddly purchased a $1.3 billion worth of credit default swap (CDS) to insure against a default of the Greek government in spring and summer of 2009 (so indirectly, the government bought protection against its own default), and those CDS was then subsequently sold in December 2009 to a private firm named IJ Partners for $40 million. Naturally, as the Greek debt crisis was getting progressively worse, the CDS in question was probably worth $27 billion in June 2011. In 2013, a Greek court decided that he should pay 30,000 euros for libel against the brother of George Papandreou and in 2014, a court decided that Kammenos accusations were false and slanderous and he should pay 100,000 euros to the IJ PARTNERS.

Kammenos has stated that "Europe is governed by German neo-Nazis". He has also called German Minister of Finance Wolfgang Schäuble persona non grata because of war reparations that Kammenos demands from Germany.

In 2013, he was investigated by a court for urging supporters to lynch a local mayor who was supporting gold mining in Skouries. Kammenos said to his supporters "(the mayor) must not be able to walk around. Lynch him."

In December 2014, Kammenos stated on television that Greek Buddhist, Jewish and Muslim religious institutions do not pay taxes (in contrast to the Church of Greece, which was exempted from income taxes beginning in 2004 and whose clergy benefit from state salaries, but also began paying property taxes on its non-monastic, non-worship space properties in 2011) as part of a comment on actions or perceived policies of the Antonis Samaras government with which he disagreed:

...Here we are looking at the Orthodoxy, which Mr. Samaras invokes in his article, the government should make up its mind about the other issues that were against the Church of Greece. Cremation, agreement with same-sex union, these are the positions that the present government took, the government of Samaras, which arrives and calls out most definitely that there should be taxation only on the Orthodox religion, here the Buddhists, the Hebrews, the Muslims don't pay, the Orthodox Church pays; indeed the monastic establishment is in danger, too...

The remark was condemned by Greece's Jewish community and government officials, who called it "conspiracy theories, lies and slander”.

Kammenos has very close links with the inner circle of Russian president Vladimir Putin.

In March 2015 Kammenos said that "If they deal a blow to Greece, then they should know Greece will suspend the Dublin II treaty, and migrants will get their ID and documents and will travel to Berlin". He also stated that "If Europe leaves us in the crisis, we will flood it with migrants, and it will be even worse for Berlin if in that wave of millions of economic migrants there will be some jihadists of the Islamic State too” and threatened that Greece would "give to migrants from everywhere the documents they need to travel in the Schengen area."

In 2016, he posted on twitter a photo holding a dead shark and tweeted “Catching the big sharks one by one,” in reference to the businessmen that the Greek government is supposed to have targeted. The shark was of the Near-threatened species of Hexanchus griseus, and was protected by the Greek law. The hunting was banned since 1981. Public opinion and WWF condemned his action. The WWF also noted that the Minister's picture is “shameful and shows no bravery,” but a disregard for Greek law.

In 2017, Panos Kammenos made a trip to London where he admitted staying in an expensive hotel and using the Greek Embassy's luxury car to go shopping for a Barbie doll for his daughter. Opposition said that the amount of money he declared in his bank account “no way justifies the expenses that he appears to be constantly making,” but there haven't been any investigations of his behavior or spending. Later, he also admitted that he visited and played at the hotel's casino. The New Democracy's vice president Adonis Georgiadis commented that according to the code of conduct of the Ministers the presence of the Minister of Defence at a casino is a criminal offence. President of To Potami, Stavros Theodorakis, wondered how Panos Kammenos could afford to go on vacations to the Alps and play at the casino while he officially claims that his bank deposits worth only 8,500 euros. The same year his name was also involved in an arm deal scandal. The deal was to sell 66 million euros in missiles and bombs to Saudi Arabia. Opposition accused him that the attempted deal was being done through a shadowy middleman, a broker that was in violation of laws requiring defense contracts to be at the government-to-government level after former defense ministers were caught up in scandals and stealing scores of millions of euros. The Greek Consul in Saudi Arabia said that Saudi authorities were unaware of who the middleman was, and asked for the agreement to become government to government. In addition the middleman was a convicted arms smuggler. Also, human rights groups, like Amnesty International, called on Greece to immediately stop the sale and transfer of military equipment to Saudi Arabia as the munitions could end up being used by the Gulf state in its war against neighbouring Yemen, where civilians were also targeted. Same year, after a Eurogroup meeting and a deal between Greece and EU, the Twitter account of Panos Kammenos tweeted a photo of a tie with Phallus. After six minutes the tweet deleted and the minister claimed it was “the kid” who did it. He did not clarify whether it was his son or some hacker. His explanation was not accepted and the opposition, twitter users and media condemned the tweet. People wondered if Kammenos had intentionally uploaded the controversial tie photo in a clumsy but clear attempt to link the agreement with the promise of prime minister Alexis Tsipras to wear a tie when the country returns to growth.

In September 2018, Greek journalists detained over an article that alleges mishandling of European Union funds meant to improve conditions in migrant hotspots across the country. The journalists were detained following a complaint by Defense Minister Panos Kammenos, whose ministry is handling the EU funding. The article published alleged some of the recipients of EU funding were businessmen connected to Kammenos. Opposition parties have condemned the detention. The detention of the journalists was condemned by the opposition and by the Journalists’ Union of Athens Daily Newspapers. The OSCE Representative on Freedom of the Media, Harlem Désir, denounced the arrest of the journalists and welcomed that the prosecutor decided not to immediately press charges, a move that led to their release. He called on authorities to decriminalize defamation. The European Anti-Fraud Office (OLAF) started an investigation over the potential misuse of EU funds. The OLAF spokesperson said that the investigation into “alleged irregularities concerning the provision of EU-funded food for refugees in Greece” was launched following information submitted by the European Commission's directorate general for migration and home affairs in 2017 and “As the investigation is on-going, OLAF cannot issue any further comment at this stage”. Adding that “The fact that OLAF is looking into the matter does not mean that any-one person or entity involved has committed an irregularity or fraud. OLAF fully respects the presumption of innocence.” A source from the Commission said the case involving the Greek Defence ministry was the only known example of irregularities that were sent to OLAF after 2017's annual Directorate-General of Migration and Home Affairs (DG HOME).

On 13 January 2019 Kammenos and his Independent Greeks party quit Greece's ruling coalition over a deal struck on the Macedonia naming dispute, potentially leaving the governing coalition without a workable majority in parliament.

== Personal life ==
Kammenos is described as "a devout Orthodox Christian."

He is the owner of Iliatoras of London, a 60 feet yacht (18m). The yacht was purchased by his father in 1993 using an offshore shell company for tax avoidance purposes.

Political offices
Preceded by Nikos Dendias	Minister of National Defence; 2015–2019	Succeeded by Evangelos Apostolakis
