= Michail Kostarakos =

Greek army officer (1956–2023)

- Μιχαήλ Κωσταράκος
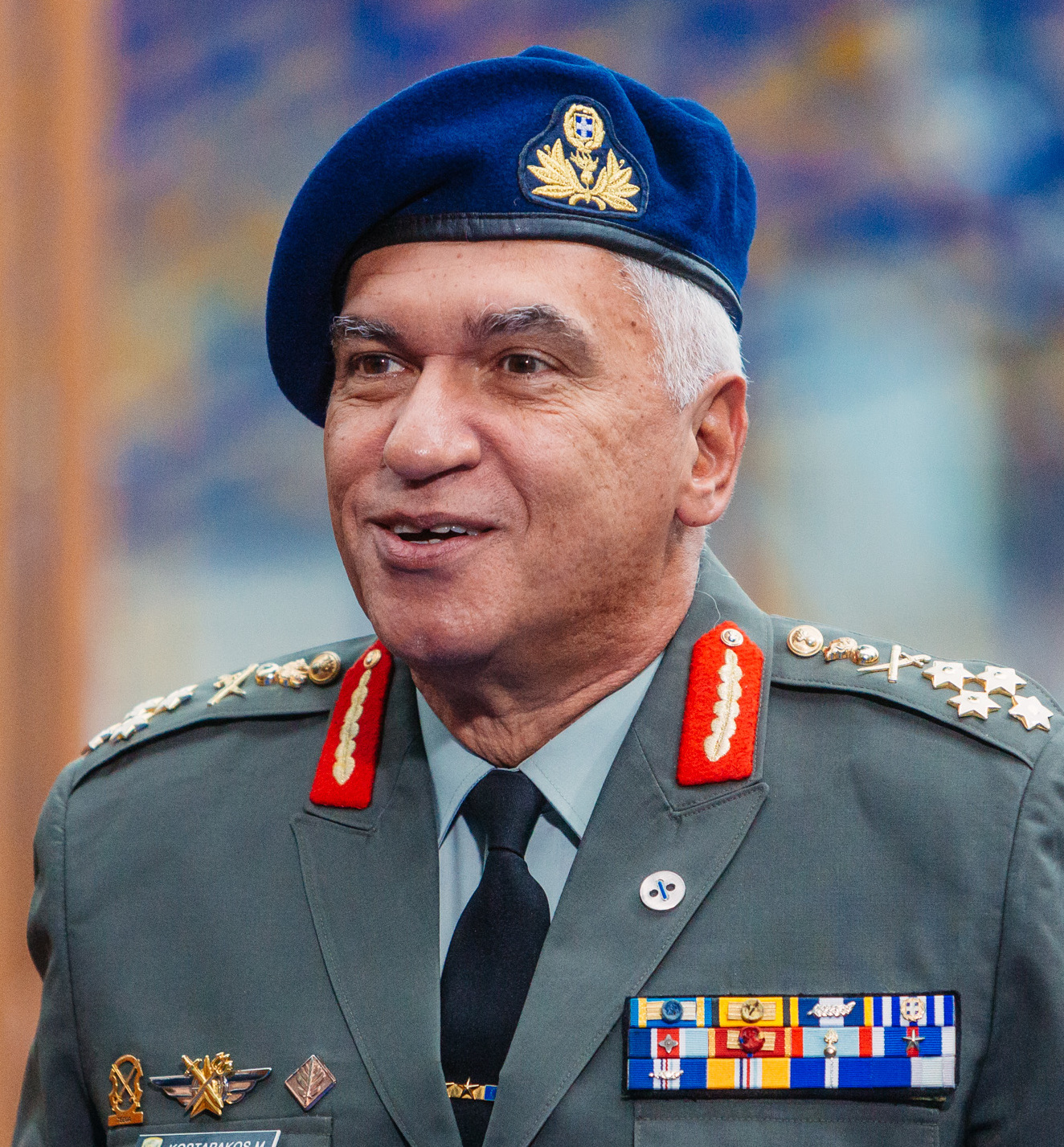
- General Kostarakos as Chairman of the EUMC
- Born: February 1956; Thessaloniki, Greece
- Died: 2 June 2023 (aged 67); Thessaloniki, Greece
- Alma mater: Hellenic Military Academy; University of Thessaloniki
- Spouse: Katerina Sgourou
- Military career
- Allegiance: Greece
- Branch: Hellenic Army
- Service years: 1978–2018
- Rank: General
- Commands: 96th National Guard Higher Command; 12th Mechanized Infantry Division; Chairman of the European Union Military Committee; Chief of the Hellenic National Defence General Staff; Commander, III Corps/NDC-GR
- Deployments: Kosovo Force
- Awards: Grand Commander of the Order of Honour; Grand Cross of the Order of the Phoenix; Medal of Military Merit 1st Class

General Michail Kostarakos (Greek: Μιχαήλ Κωσταράκος, February 1956 – 2 June 2023) was a Hellenic Army officer who served as Chief of the Hellenic National Defence General Staff in 2011–2015 and as Chairman of the European Union Military Committee in 2015–2018.

== Life and career ==
Michail Kostarakos was born in Thessaloniki in February 1956. He was the son of Major General Dimitrios Kostarakos, who fought in the last battles of the Greek Civil War and in the Korean War. He completed his school studies in the University of Thessaloniki's Experimental School, before enrolling in the Hellenic Military Academy in 1974, from which he graduated in 1978 as a Second Lieutenant of Artillery. Kostarakos served in various posts in both field and especially anti-aircraft artillery (the MIM-23 Hawk system), attended various schools and academies (including the US Army's Hawk course at Fort Bliss), as well as in senior staff positions in NATO's International Military Staff, the KFOR's Joint Operation Center, and Greece's NDC-GR.

As a field officer (Brigadier General in 2006), he commanded the 96th National Guard Higher Command at Chios, the 3rd Bureau and the Operations Command of the Hellenic Army General Staff, the 12th Mechanized Infantry Division, and finally the III Army Corps/NDC-GR, before being promoted to full General and assuming the post of Chief of the Hellenic National Defence General Staff on 1 November 2011. On 13 November 2014, he was elected as the next Chairman of the European Union Military Committee, with a three-year tenure starting from November 2015.

Kostarakos was awarded several distinctions, including the Grand Cross of the Order of the Phoenix, the Grand Commander of the Order of Honour, the Armenian Medal for Military Co-operation, and the NATO Medal for the Balkans.

General Kostarakos was married and had two daughters. He also spoke English and French, completed a graduate degree in the Law School of the University of Athens, and held a post-graduate degree in Diplomatic and Strategic Studies.

On 20 August 2015, the Government Council for Foreign Affairs and Defence decided the retirement of Kostarakos and his replacement with the hitherto Chief of the Hellenic Navy General Staff, Vice Admiral Evangelos Apostolakis, taking effect on 15 September. Kostarakos was immediately recalled to active duty pending his assumption of the post of Chairman of the European Union Military Committee, which took place on 6 November 2015.

Kostarakos died on 2 June 2023, at the age of 67.

Military offices
Preceded by Air Chief Marshal Ioannis Giangos	Chief of the Hellenic National Defence General Staff; 1 November 2011 – 15 September 2015	Succeeded by Admiral Evangelos Apostolakis
Preceded by Patrick de Rousiers	Chairman of the European Union Military Committee; 6 November 2015 – 6 November 2018	Succeeded by General Claudio Graziano
