= Construction troops =

Construction troops are military engineering personnel and units who construct and repair buildings and other facilities, notably dams, bridges or roads. Notable examples are the United States Army Corps of Engineers; the Russian Road Troops; or the Construction Troops (Bulgaria) during the Cold War. This sub-specialty of engineering is confusingly known as civil engineering. They can construct military infrastructure, defensive structures and communications infrastructure, and often deal with provision of housing of troops in both wartime and peacetime.

Military construction units and formations may be combined into an independent branch of the armed forces (as, for example, in Bulgaria), or be part of other branches of the armed forces, services, and may also be outside the Armed Forces, being paramilitary or separate organisations.

The Sapper army of the Red Army during the Second World War was perhaps the single largest construction formation in the field. Although the organization of military construction engineers into such a large formation was unusual, the use of dedicated troops for military construction was common to many armies during that war. The sapper army troops were in some senses comparable to German Baupionier units and U.S. Army Engineer General Service regiments of the Second World War.

== National models ==
=== Australia ===
The Australian Army maintained several construction squadrons of the Royal Australian Engineers. One surviving squadron is the 17th Construction Squadron. Others were the 21st, 22nd, and 24th Construction Squadrons.

=== Nazi Germany ===
In Nazi Germany the Organization Todt was a construction organism. At the initial stage of the existence of these formations, service in them for German citizens conditionally corresponded to alternative civilian service, which currently exists in a number of countries around the world. After November 1942, personnel of German nationality, and then from the spring of 1944, the military personnel of other nationalities were given full status equal to those of the Wehrmacht. There was also another paramilitary organization of Nazi Germany, which included military construction units—the Reich Labour Service (RAD). In the RAD, from 1935 onward, all German male citizens, and from the start of the Second World War also female citizens, served six months of labor service twice a year (fit young men served this service until conscription into the armed forces). From the spring of 1944, RAD personnel were also given the same status as Wehrmacht personnel.

=== North Korea ===
The Korean People's Army is heavily involved in construction activities in the DPRK. In late 2025, two separate batches of about 1,000 soldiers total from the 2215th Construction Brigade under the DPRK Ministry of Defence were sent to construction sites in Russian regions impacted by the unprovoked 2022 Russian invasion of Ukraine.

=== Mongolia ===
The Construction and Engineering Forces, also known as the Corps of Engineers, is a engineer branch of the Mongolian Armed Forces that specializes in military construction and civil works. They also construct combat defensive positions, serve as military engineering, sappers, and detect mines. They have played a leading role in Armed Forces peacekeeping missions and have successfully participated in UN peacekeeping operations and joint international training exercises.

=== Soviet Union ===
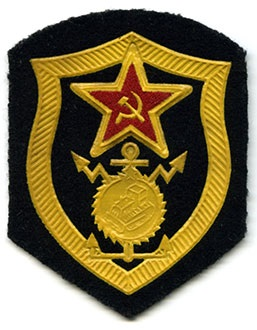
Emblem of the military Construction Troops (1985).

Military construction units (colloquially "стройбат" — short for "construction battalion") — is a general term used in specialized literature, combining two main types of organizationally independent administrative and economic units for military construction purposes (military units), such as military construction detachments and construction units, which were part of the Ministry of Defence, as well as other security and civilian ministries of the Soviet Union.

The primary command and control bodies for the billeting and provisioning of troops in the Soviet Armed Forces comprising the military districts and fleets of the Soviet Navy, and their corresponding structures, the Ministry of Internal Affairs and the Committee for State Security (KGB), were the military construction directorates (MCDs) of the districts and the naval construction directorates (NCDs) of the fleets. Overall direction for all these activities was the responsibility of the Deputy Minister of Defence for Construction and Billetting.

In the Union of Soviet Socialist Republics, and later in the Russian Federation, military construction units were never an independent branch of the armed forces, but existed only as separate military construction units subordinate to a variety of organisations. In the Russian Federation, from 1996 to 2017, alongside military construction units, there were engineering and technical military formations under the Federal Executive Bodies, which carried out activities in the field of specialized construction, as well as in the field of operation, restoration, and construction of telecommunications networks.

The military construction directorates were subordinate to the engineering work directorates (UIR), which were subordinate to the chief of work directorates (COW)—the equivalent of the civil construction directorates.

The Work Supervisor's Offices were responsible for construction and assembly sites (SMU), construction sites (SU), warehouses, transport bases, and human resources concentrated in military construction units of districts, Groups of forces, fleets, and other formations of the USSR Armed Forces and civilian ministries.

One of these units was the 57th Engineer-Construction Brigade of the Group of Soviet Forces in Germany, located at Forst Zinna in Brandenburg (Military Unit Number 96898).

Military construction units had virtually no weapons. Military construction units typically had a limited number of training small arms and service weapons for officers, not counting construction, special-purpose, and automotive equipment.

Taking into account the number of military construction detachments (around 500 – only in civilian ministries and departments) with an average staff strength of 600–800 people in the 1980s, the personnel of military construction units reached 300–400 thousand people, which at that time quantitatively exceeded such branches of the armed forces as the Soviet Airborne Forces (60,000), Soviet Naval Infantry (15,000) and Soviet Border Troops of the KGB (220,000) — taken together. Despite their widespread use and large numbers, the work of military construction workers in the civilian economy, as some believed, was contrary to the Constitution of the USSR and the USSR Law on Universal Military Service, and such units themselves were illegal.

==== Military Construction Detachments (Units) ====
The core of the Military Construction Complex (MCC) of the Soviet Ministry of Defence, as well as the military construction units of other ministries and departments of the Soviet Union, were military construction detachments (MCDs), which had the status of military construction organizations (with corresponding full formal designation), whose task was to perform construction and assembly and other work in construction, industrial, logging and other raw materials enterprises of the USSR. Another type of such formations were separate military construction companies (SMCC), which had a similar status, organizational and staff structure and the same tasks in the field of construction and performance of other works in the interests of defense and security of the state, as well as the national economy of the Soviet Union.

Military construction detachments and separate military construction companies were business accounting organizations and were supported primarily by their own funds, earned through their labour. The bulk of the personnel of the VSO and OVSR were workers who were not military personnel, but had a special status—military construction workers. The term "military builders" was introduced by Resolution of the Council of Ministers of the USSR No. 787 of September 18, 1964 and was enshrined in the "Regulation on the military construction detachments of the USSR Ministry of Defense" of 1965, before that the term "workers of military construction detachments" was used.

=== United Kingdom and United States ===
Many countries worldwide have "military construction formations," primarily those with fairly large armed forces, the most significant of which are part of the US Army Corps of Engineers. What is now the USACE Transatlantic Division carried out significant base construction activities for the Afghan National Army until 2021 and the Iraqi Army until 2010.

Many British Army construction activities were carried on by the Military Works Force. However the first enlisted construction force was the Soldier Artificer Company, a unit raised in Gibraltar in 1772 to work on improving the fortifications there.

The United States Navy formed the Construction Battalions, popularly known as Seabees, during the Second World War. Their origins however stretch back to the 1930s, when the Navy Bureau of Yards and Docks began providing for "Navy Construction Battalions" (CB) in contingency war plans. In 1934, Capt. Carl Carlson's version of the CB was approved by the Chief of Naval Operations.

The Air Service, United States Army, extensively used Construction Companies during the First World War. The List of American construction companies in World War I lists their origins and fate.

== See also ==
- Mixed Groups of Reconstruction Machines – Greek organisation
