= HPER Biomechanics Laboratory =

Laboratory at the University of Nebraska Omaha

The HPER Biomechanics Laboratory is located on the campus of the University of Nebraska Omaha in Omaha, in the United States. It is a center dedicated to the discovering of the neuromuscular control mechanism of human movement pattern. The director of the HPER Biomechanics Laboratory is Dr. Nicholas Stergiou.

The laboratory is unique in that it is dedicated to interdisciplinary research that engages in both theoretical and experimental neuromuscular control questions. HPER Biomechanics Laboratory scientists have been responsible for many important discoveries related to the motor control of movement patterns.
