= Evangelos Apostolakis =

Greek naval officer

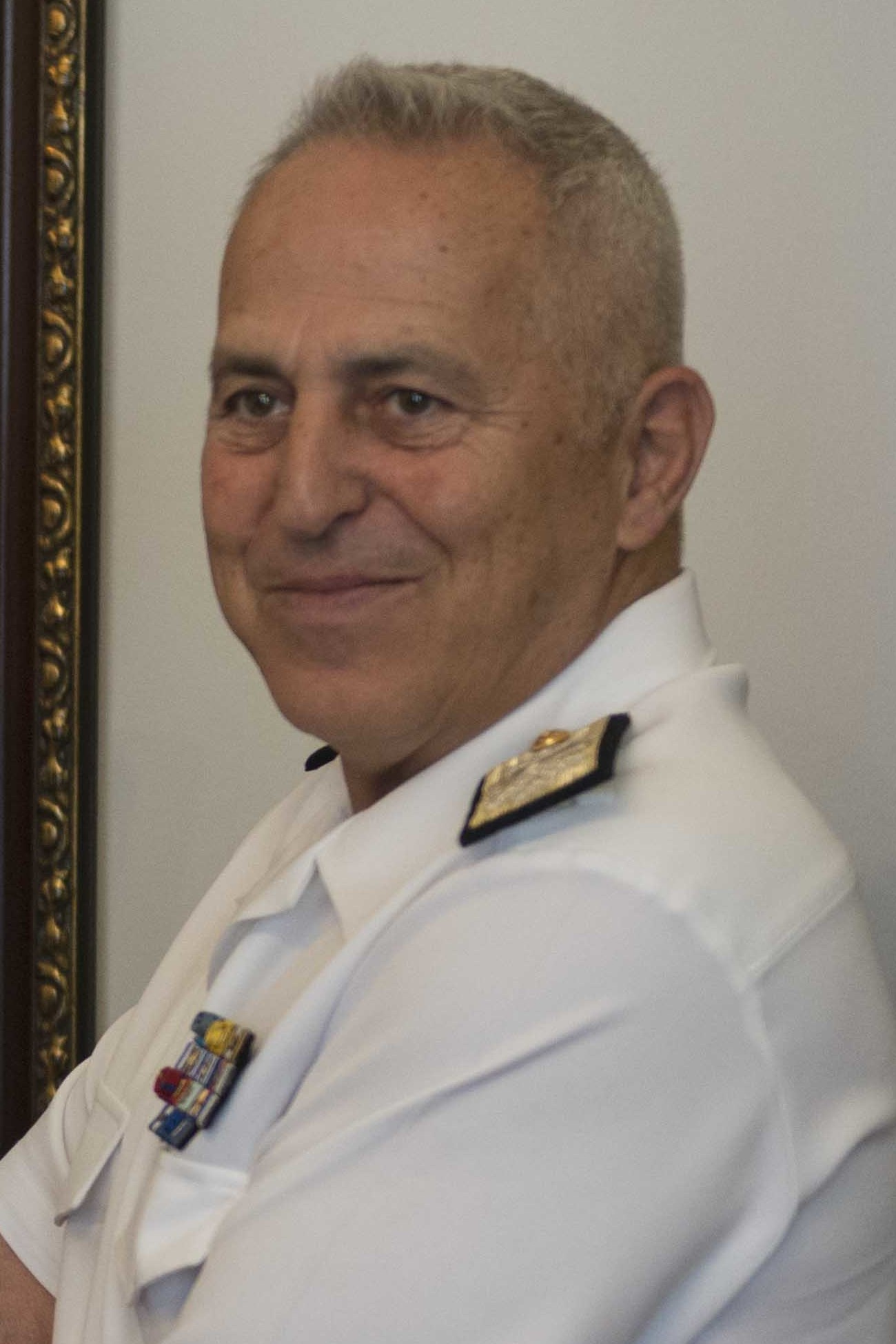
- Admiral Apostolakis in 2018

Minister of National Defence
- In office 15 January 2019 – 9 July 2019
- President: Prokopis Pavlopoulos
- Prime Minister: Alexis Tsipras
- Preceded by: Panos Kammenos
- Succeeded by: Nikos Panagiotopoulos

Personal details
- Born: May 14, 1957 (age 68) Rethymno, Crete

Military service
- Allegiance: Greece
- Branch/service: Hellenic Navy
- Years of service: 1976−2019
- Rank: Admiral
- Commands: Chief of the Hellenic National Defence General Staff; Chief of the Hellenic Navy General Staff; Commander of the Underwater Demolition Command (DYK)

Admiral Evangelos Apostolakis (Greek: Ευάγγελος Αποστολάκης) is a Greek naval officer. After leading the Hellenic Navy General Staff in 2013–2015, he served as the Chief of the Hellenic National Defence General Staff until 14 January 2019, and then, until 9 July 2019, as the Minister of National Defence of Greece.

He was elected to the Greek Parliament on the nationwide list for Syriza both in May and June 2023 Greek legislative elections. On 28 November 2024 he left the party and became independent.

== Career ==
He was born in Rethymno on 14 May 1957. Entered the Hellenic Navy Academy in 1976 and graduated in 1980 as a Line Ensign. He has served in a succession of command and staff positions aboard ships, and senior staff positions in the Hellenic Navy and NATO, as well as completing the Underwater Demolition School of the Hellenic Navy's elite Underwater Demolition Command (DYK), which he later commanded, the Advanced Mine Warfare School in Belgium and the US Amphibious Warfare School.

On 7 March 2013, the Government Council for Foreign Affairs and Defence (KYSEA) appointed him to the post of Chief of the Hellenic Navy General Staff. On 20 August 2015, KYSEA selected him as the successor of General Michail Kostarakos as Chief of the Hellenic National Defence General Staff, promoting him to full Admiral. The order took effect on 15 September.

Following the resignation of Minister of National Defence Panos Kammenos on 13 January 2019, Apostolakis was named as his successor by Prime Minister Alexis Tsipras. He was placed into retirement and immediately sworn in as Minister of National Defence on 14 January, with the official hand-over scheduled for 15 January. Until the appointment of a new Chief of the HNDGS by KYSEA, the Deputy Chief, Lt. General Konstantinos Floros, was named acting Chief.

== Greece–Turkey relations ==
In December 2018, Apostolakis was quoted at meeting with defence ministry correspondents as saying, "If the Turks land on a Greek rock islet we will flatten it." He also stated that efforts were focused on avoiding a military conflict with Turkey.

== Dates of rank ==
Ensign	1980
Sub-Lieutenant	1983
Lieutenant	1987
Lieutenant Commander	1992
Commander	1997
Captain	2004
Commodore	2009
Rear Admiral	2011
Vice Admiral	2012
Admiral	2015

== Awards ==
- Grand Cross of the Order of the Phoenix (Greece)
- Commander of the Order of Honour (Greece)
- Commander of the National Order of Merit (France)
- Knights Commander's Cross of the Order of Merit of the Federal Republic of Germany

Political offices
Preceded by Panos Kammenos	Minister of National Defence; 15 January – 9 July 2019	Succeeded by Nikos Panagiotopoulos
Military offices
Preceded by Vice Admiral Kosmas Christidis	Chief of the Hellenic Navy General Staff; 7 March 2013 – 15 September 2015	Succeeded by Vice Admiral Georgios Giakoumakis
Preceded by General Michail Kostarakos	Chief of the Hellenic National Defence General Staff; 15 September 2015 – 14 January 2019	Succeeded by Lt. General Konstantinos Floros (acting)
