= Douvas =

Douvas is a surname. Notable people with the surname include:

- Elaine Douvas (born 1952), American classical oboist
- Nikolaos Douvas (born 1947), Greek general
