= Stergiou =

Stergiou is a surname. Notable people with the surname include:

- Antonia Stergiou (born 1985), Greek high jumper
- Leonidas Stergiou (born 2002), Swiss footballer
- Nicholas Stergiou (born 1965), Greek-American biomechanic
- Vladimir Petrović-Stergiou (born 1977), Serbian-Greek basketball player
