= Veryvakis =

Veryvakis is a surname. Notable people with the surname include:

- Eleftherios Veryvakis (1935–2012), Greek politician
- Ioannis Veryvakis (1930–2019), Greek Army officer
