= Bob Boote =

British soldier in Greece

Robert Edward Boote (6 February 1920 – 25 November 2019) was awarded the Distinguished Service Medal DSM from the United Kingdom for his service as a soldier in Greece. He also received the Royal Victorian Order CVO for his work as an environmentalist who regarded people and pollution as the key threats to the countryside.

== Early life ==
Robert Edward Boote, known as Bob, was born in Stoke on Trent. His father was a local government officer and Methodist. After leaving Hanley High School, a grammar school in Stoke-on-Trent, at the age of 16, he started work in the City Council's architectural department.

== Military service ==
Boote served on anti-aircraft units in England. Later towards the end of the war, he went to Greece and was in the Special Operations Executive for the British Military Mission. Here he liaised with Greek National Guard Defence Battalions forces which were instrumental in the Greek Civil War at the end of which on 14 October 1949 he was awarded the Distinguished Service Medal for this work. He was also made an honorary Major before leaving the army.

== Environmental work ==
After war service, Boote worked for Stoke on Trent and then Staffordshire's planning departments . He studied public administration and gained a BSc in economics from the University of London in 1952. In 1954 he joined the UK government's Nature Conservancy later becoming its deputy director. He worked on revising its organisation and was the first Director General of the newly formed Nature Conservancy Council in 1973. He held this post until retiring in 1980.

He was dismayed by the environmental damage done by industrial development and proposed changing government policies to promote environmental recovery. His chosen motto was said to be a “policy of continuous improvement.” In 1967 Penguin published his influential book Man and Environment: Crisis and the Strategy of Choice under the pen name of Robert Arvill. In 1969 he led in a short film on the changes being undertaken in Stoke on Trent to transform industrial wasteland into environmentally rich community amenities. In 1970 he organised the European Conservation Year which spanned twenty-one countries and over 200,000 events, including a conference in Stuttgart attended by many high status people and which was reported in the New York Times.

In the 1971 Birthday Honours he was made a Commander of the Royal Victorian Order (CVO). He advised many bodies and people including Princes Philip and Charles in the UK.

In retirement, he continued to be an active environmentalist, including promoting the protection of Antarctica and being vice-chair of the UK charity The Conservation Volunteers organisation up until 2018.

== Personal life ==
Boote married Vera Badian in 1948. She was a nurse born in Austria and died in 2015. They had a daughter and four years later a son.
