= Agamemnon Gratzios =

- Αγαμέμνων Γκράτζιος
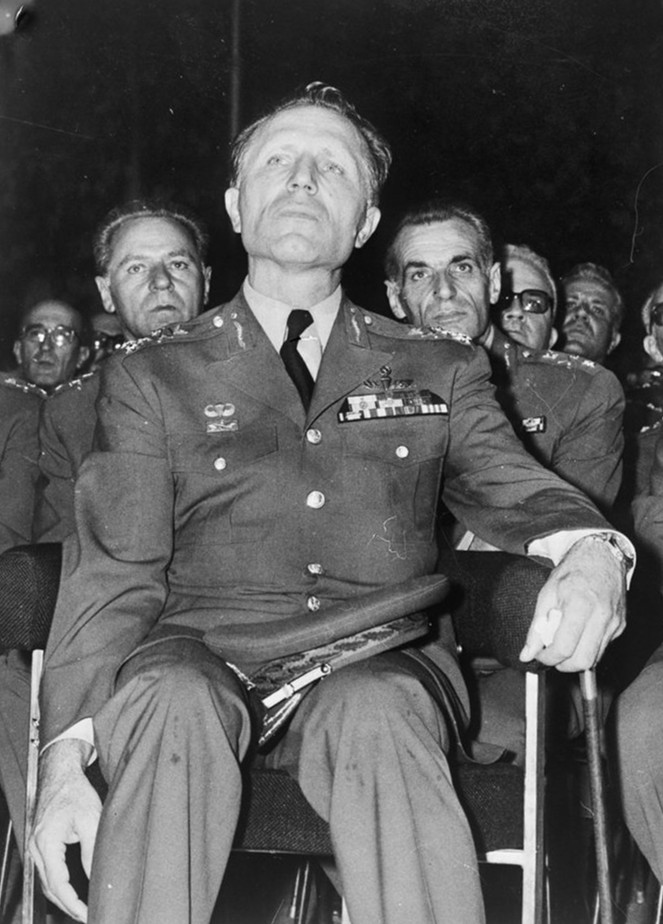
- Gratzios in Thessaloniki in 1974.
- Born: 28 February 1922; Elafotopos, Zagori, Kingdom of Greece
- Died: 11 August 1993 (aged 71)
- Military career
- Allegiance: Kingdom of Greece; Third Hellenic Republic
- Branch: Hellenic Army
- Service years: 1940–1982
- Rank: General
- Commands: Chief of the Hellenic National Defence General Staff; Chief of the Hellenic Army General Staff
- Conflicts: World War II: Greco-Italian War; Battle of Greece; Battle of Crete; Greek Civil War
- Awards: Gold Cross of Valour (twice)

Agamemnon Gratzios (Greek: Αγαμέμνων Γκράτζιος, 28 February 1922 – 11 August 1993) was a Hellenic Army officer who rose to the rank of full General, and held the posts of Chief of the Hellenic Army General Staff and of the Hellenic National Defence General Staff.

He was born in the village of Elafotopos, Zagori in the Ioannina Prefecture, in 1922. His surname is sometimes written as Gratsios (Greek: Αγαμέμνων Γκράτσιος), though official army documents always used Gratzios (Greek: Αγαμέμνων Γκράτζιος). He entered the Hellenic Military Academy, but the outbreak of the Greco-Italian War on 28 October 1940 interrupted his studies; along with his classmates, he participated in the Battle of Crete, where he was seriously wounded. In 1942 he was named a second lieutenant. During the Greek Civil War, he served as a platoon, company and battery commander, being promoted to lieutenant (1946) and captain (1948). He was again wounded during the Battle of Naousa in April 1949. Gratzios was an artillery officer, but after the civil war, he was trained in special operations in Greece and Germany and held several command and staff positions in the Greek Special Forces: commander of the Paratroopers School, of the 5th Raider Squadron, of the Special Forces in Cyprus (in 1965–67). He also commanded the 12th Infantry Division, the ASDEN and III Army Corps, and First Army, being successively promoted to major (1952), lieutenant colonel (1958), colonel (1967), brigadier (1971), major general (1972) and lieutenant general (1974). On 14 September 1976 he assumed the position of Chief of the Army Command, which a year later was reconstituted again as the Hellenic Army General Staff, a post he held until 11 January 1980, when he was appointed as Chief of the Hellenic National Defence General Staff and promoted to full general. He finally retired on 19 January 1982.

He died in 1993.

Military offices
Preceded by Lt General Ioannis Davos	Chief of the Hellenic Army General Staff; 14 September 1976 – 11 January 1980	Succeeded by Lt General Efthymios Karagiannis
Preceded by General Ioannis Davos	Chief of the Hellenic National Defence General Staff; 11 January 1980 – 19 January 1982	Succeeded by Admiral Theodoros Degiannis
