= Iakovos Tsounis =

Iakovos Tsounis (1924–2021) was a Greek businessman, shipowner, and national benefactor.

He was born in Patras, Greece and became known for his successful career in shipping. Throughout his life, he supported the Greek Armed Forces and various charitable causes.

Tsounis gained widespread recognition when he donated almost all of his fortune (23 million euros and 60 landing craft for amphibious operations) to the Greek Armed Forces, just two months before his death. His contributions were considered among the largest private donations to the Greek military.

In recognition of his contributions, he received several honors from the Greek state.
