= Ioannis Veryvakis =

Greek Army officer (1930–2019)

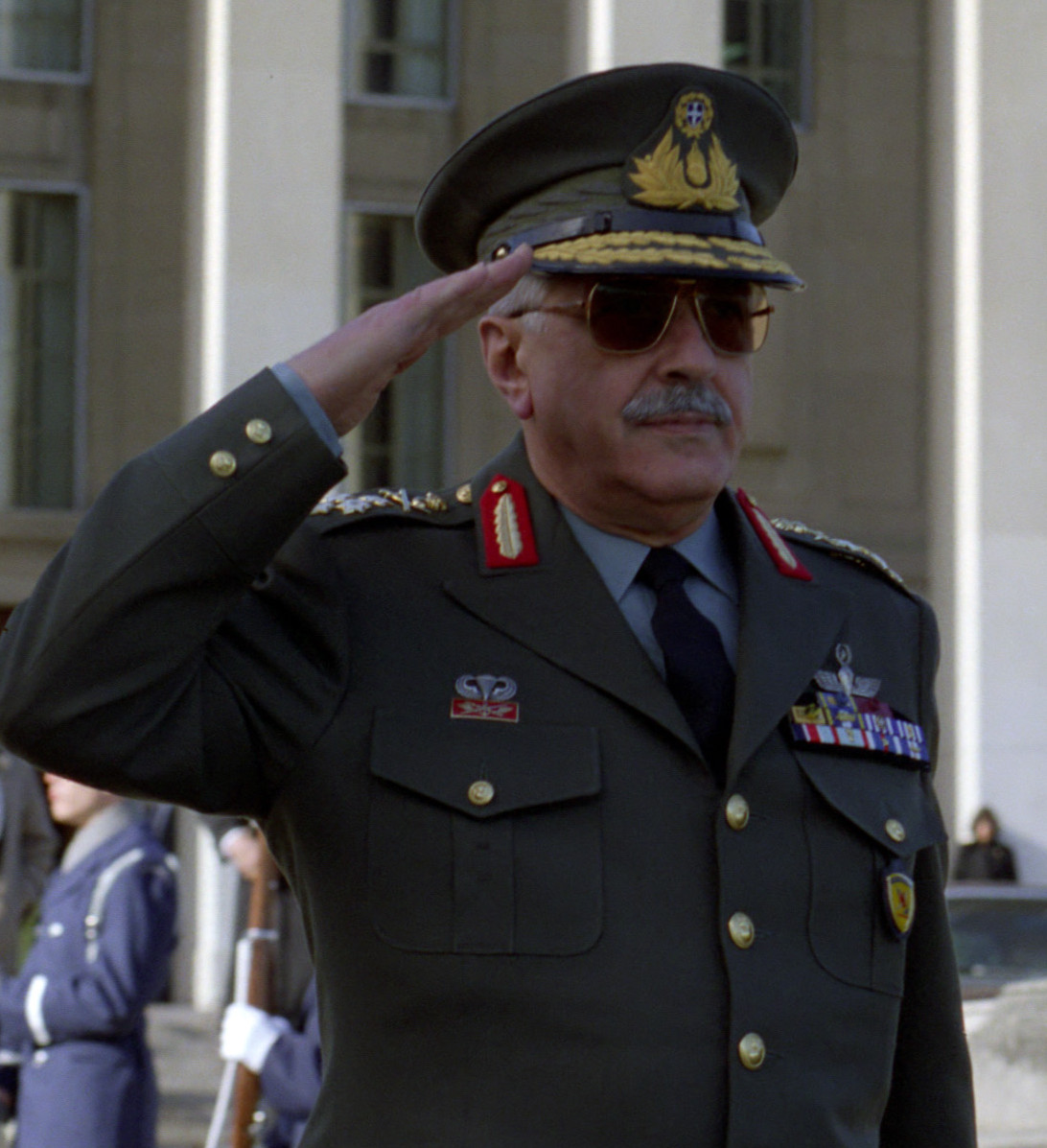
- General Veryvakis in 1993, during a visit in Washington, DC
- Born: November 3, 1930; Edessa, Greece
- Died: June 19, 2019 (aged 88); Athens, Greece
- Military career
- Allegiance: Greece
- Branch: Hellenic Army
- Service years: 1950–1993
- Rank: General
- Commands: Chief of the Hellenic National Defence General Staff; Chief of the Hellenic Army General Staff

Ioannis Veryvakis (Greek: Ιωάννης Βερυβάκης; 3 November 1930 – 19 June 2019) was a Greek Army officer who rose to the rank of full General, and held the posts of Chief of the Hellenic Army General Staff and of the Hellenic National Defence General Staff.

== Life and career ==
Ioannis Veryvakis was born in Edessa in northern Greece on 3 November 1930. His parents were from Crete. He was the son of Lt. General Dimitrios Veryvakis and brother of the PASOK MP and minister, Lefteris Veryvakis.

He entered the Hellenic Army Academy in 1950, and graduated as an Infantry Second Lieutenant on 9 August 1953. He was promoted to Lieutenant in 1956, Captain in 1960, Major in 1967, Lt. Colonel in 1975, Colonel in 1981, Brigadier in 1983, Major General in 1984, and Lt. General in 1986. He attended infantry and parachutist courses in Greece, the U.S. Army Special Warfare School and the U.S. Army Anti-Tank Guided Missile School in West Germany (where he graduated with distinction), as well as the higher staff and command courses of the Superior War School and the National Defence School.

He served as a field and staff officer in various units, including as instructor in the Infantry School, infantry battalion commander, special forces battalion commander, chief of staff of the 3rd Special Forces Division, infantry regiment commander, director of the 2nd Staff Bureau of the Hellenic Army General Staff, director of HAGS 1st Branch, commander of the 3rd Special Forces Division, commander of the ASDEN, and Army Inspector-General.

On 5 July 1989 he was appointed Chief of the GES, and remained in the position until promoted to full general and appointed Chief of the Hellenic National Defence General Staff on 7 May 1990. He retired on 11 March 1993. From July 1991 to June 1992 he also served as chairman of the NATO Military Committee. Amidst the climate of polarization between the socialist PASOK and the conservative New Democracy at the time, the decision of the conservative government under Konstantinos Mitsotakis to select Veryvakis, whose brother was a prominent PASOK politician, as head of the country's armed forces was widely commented at the time.

In addition to the usual Greek decorations for his rank and positions, he received the following foreign decorations: Commander of the Legion of Merit (USA), Commander of the Legion of Honour (France), and the Order of the Madara Horseman, First Class with Swords (Bulgaria).

He was married with two children.

Military offices
Preceded by Lt. General Stamatis Vellidis	Chief of the Hellenic Army General Staff; 5 July 1989 – 7 May 1990	Succeeded by Lt. General Dimitrios Skarvelis
Preceded by General Stamatis Vellidis	Chief of the Hellenic National Defence General Staff; 7 May 1990 – 11 March 1993	Succeeded by General Dimitrios Skarvelis
