= Athanasios Tzoganis =

- Born: 15 July 1939 (age 87); Skourtou, Aetolia-Acarnania
- Died: 25 August 2026 Athens
- Allegiance: Greece
- Branch: Hellenic Air Force
- Rank: Air Chief Marshal
- Commands: Chief of National Defense General Staff; Chief of Air Force General Staff

Air Chief Marshal Athanasios Tzoganis (Greek: Αθανάσιος Τζογάνης; born 15 July 1939) was a retired Hellenic Air Force officer who served as Chief of the Hellenic National Defence General Staff in 1996–1999. Born in Skourtou, Aetolia-Acarnania, he entered the Hellenic Air Force Academy in 1959 and graduated first in his class in 1962. He flew F-84, A-7, G-159, T-33, NORATLAS, C-47 and C-130 aircraft and held several staff positions and active commands (345 Bomber Squadron and 112 Fighter Wing). From 1982 to 1983 he was aide-de-camp to Prime Minister and Defense Minister Andreas Papandreou. He later headed the Air Support Command, the Hellenic Tactical Air Force Command and finally became Chief of the Hellenic Air Force General Staff on 17 December 1993. He held the post until 16 February 1996, when he was appointed to the position of Chief of the Hellenic National Defence General Staff, a position he held until 15 February 1999. He was married and had two daughters.

Tzoganis was one of the pilots who on 21 July 1974 had been ordered to fly to Souda, in order to airlift a Greek Commando battalion to Cyprus (Operation Niki). According to orders, all aircraft had to depart before midnight so that darkness would provide enough cover for their return flight. At around 24:00, Tzoganis' aircraft was ready to depart when the control tower announced the termination of all take offs. Strictly adhering to orders, Tzoganis turned back and shut down his engines. However, two of the following aircraft (Niki-14, piloted by Panayotis Limperopoulos and Niki-15, piloted by Evangelos Petroulakis) insisted on departing and took off at 00:20 and 00.23.

== Sources ==
- "Ο αντιπτέραρχος Τζογάνης νέος αρχηγός ΓΕΕΘΑ" (in Greek). Makedonia. 16 February 1996. Archived from the original on 27 November 2003.
