= Georgios Peridis =

Georgios Peridis (Greek: Γεώργιος Περίδης) (1915 – 1985) was an officer of the Greek army.

He was born in 1915. He took part in the Greco–Italian War, when he served in the VIII Division. He also participated in the Greek resistance with the National Groups of Greek Guerrillas (EOEA). He also fought in the Greek Civil War in 1946–1949. He distinguished himself in the battles of Konitsa as a major in charge of the 582nd Infantry Battalion.

When the Coup d'état of 21 April 1967 took place, he was a lieutenant general in charge of the Military Command of Evros. As deputy general commander of the 3rd Army Corps and pro-royalist, he participated in the royal counter-coup of December 13, 1967, which failed. He was then demobilised and sent into exile.

He died in 1985.
