= Ioannis Davos =

Greek army general (1918–2008)

- Ιωάννης Ντάβος
- Born: c. 1918; Agios Georgios, Messenia, Kingdom of Greece
- Died: 15 January 2008; Athens, Third Hellenic Republic
- Education: Hellenic Military Academy
- Military career
- Allegiance: Kingdom of Greece; Republic of Cyprus; Third Hellenic Republic
- Branch: Hellenic Army; Cypriot National Guard
- Service years: 1940–1980
- Rank: General
- Commands: Chief of Staff of the Cypriot National Guard; III Army Corps; Chief of the Armed Forces High Command; Chief of the Hellenic Army General Staff; Chief of the Armed Forces High Command
- Wars: World War II: Greco-Italian War; Battle of Trebeshina; Battle of Greece; Greek Resistance; Greek Civil War
- Awards: Gold Cross of Valour
- Other work: Deputy Minister for National Defence

Ioannis Davos (Greek: Ιωάννης Ντάβος, 1918 – 15 January 2008) was a Hellenic Army officer who rose to the rank of full general, and held the posts of Chief of the Hellenic Army General Staff and of the Armed Forces High Command.

He was born in the village of Agios Georgios in Messenia, in 1918. He entered the Hellenic Army Academy, but the outbreak of the Greco-Italian War on 28 October 1940 interrupted his studies: he was commissioned as a second lieutenant and participated in the campaign, being seriously wounded at the Battle of Trebeshina. Following the collapse of the Greek army during the German invasion of Greece and the subsequent occupation, he was active in the Greek Resistance, forming armed guerrilla groups in the Triphylia-Olympia area and being again wounded. He was named a lieutenant upon Liberation in 1944, and participated in the subsequent Greek Civil War as a company commander with the rank of Captain (1946). He was promoted to Major (1951), Lt. Colonel (1956), Colonel (1967, retroactive to 1960), Brigadier (1970). He commanded the 30th Infantry Regiment and the 11th Infantry Division, as well as serving in various staff positions - including two stints in Cyprus, in 1964–66 as head of the Operations Bureau and in 1969–70 as Chief of Staff of the Cypriot National Guard - and teaching in the Supreme War School.

In 1973 he was promoted to lieutenant general and sent to command the III Army Corps in Macedonia. During the July 1974 crisis, brought about by the coup against Cypriot president Makarios III sponsored by the then-ruling Greek military regime and the subsequent Turkish invasion, Davos thus found himself in command of the most powerful formation in the Hellenic Army. It was partly the threat of his active intervention that forced the Armed Forces leadership to topple junta strongman Dimitrios Ioannidis and surrender power to a civilian government under Konstantinos Karamanlis. Shortly after, on 19 August 1974, Davos was appointed as Chief of the Hellenic Army General Staff, from which position he helped ensure the loyalty of the army to the new regime, which was still under threat by hardline officers. He continued in this post until 13 September 1976, when he was promoted to full General and placed as Chief of the Armed Forces High Command. He retired on 10 January 1980, and subsequently served as Deputy Minister for National Defence in January–May 1981.

He died on 15 January 2008. He was married and had three children.

Military offices
Preceded by Lt General Andreas Galatsanos	Chief of the Hellenic Army General Staff; 19 August 1974 – 13 September 1976	Succeeded by Lt General Agamemnon Gratsios
Preceded by General Dionysios Arbouzis	Chief of the Hellenic National Defence General Staff; 14 September 1976 – 10 January 1980	Succeeded by General Agamemnon Gratsios
