= Panagiotis Chinofotis =

Greek admiral and politician (born 1949)

- Born: August 12, 1949 (age 76); Athens, Greece
- Allegiance: Greece
- Branch: Hellenic Navy
- Service years: 1971–2007
- Rank: Admiral
- Commands: Chief of the Hellenic National Defence General Staff; Chief of the Hellenic Navy Fleet Command
- Awards: Knight's Gold Cross of the Order of Honour, Knight's Gold Cross of the Order of the Phoenix, Medal of Military Merit, Commendation Medal of Merit and Honour, Navy Force Formation Command Medal, Navy Force Meritorious Command Medal, Staff Officer Service Commendation Medal
- Other work: Vice-Minister of the Interior

Admiral Panagiotis Chinofotis (Greek: Παναγιώτης Χηνοφώτης, also transliterated Panayiotis Khinofotis, born 12 August 1949) is a retired Hellenic Navy officer, who served as the Chief of the Hellenic National Defense General Staff from 2005 to 2007. He was also a member of parliament with the New Democracy party and served as Vice-Minister of the Interior in the Second Cabinet of Kostas Karamanlis.

Born in Athens, Chinofotis graduated from the Hellenic Naval Academy and was commissioned an Ensign in 1971. He served aboard several patrol boats, destroyers and frigates of the Hellenic Navy before being sent to the Hellenic Naval War College, from which he graduated in 1986. He was then sent to study at the United States Naval War College and Salve Regina University, from which he graduated with a master's degree in international relations.

After graduation, Chinofotis was promoted to Commander, and was made commandant of the Hellenic Naval War College. In 1991, he was made commander of the HS Lemnos, flagship of the Commander-in-Chief, Hellenic Fleet.

In 1993, Chinofotis began a two-year assignment as Hellenic Military Representative to NATO in Brussels. He next spent a year as Commander of the Fleet Command, followed by a tour as Deputy Military Representative of Greece to the European Union, serving as chairman of the Military Working Group during Greece's EU Presidency.

Chinofotis next progressed through several staff assignments until, in 2004, by now a vice admiral, he became Chief of the Fleet Command. A year later, he was promoted to Admiral and became Chief of the Hellenic National Defense General Staff.

On 21 August 2007, he resigned in order to participate in the September legislative elections, where he was elected MP on the statewide ticket for New Democracy. On 19 September he was sworn in the new cabinet as Vice-Minister of the Interior, a position he held until 2009.

Military offices
Preceded by General Georgios Antonakopoulos	Chief of Hellenic National Defense General Staff; 2005-2007	Succeeded by General Dimitrios Grapsas
