= National Guard Defence Battalions =

Greek paramilitary organization

The National Guard Defence Battalions or TEA (Greek: Τάγματα Εθνοφυλακής Αμύνης, ΤΕΑ) were a paramilitary battalions unit organization active in Greece (especially Northern Greece) between 1948 and 1982, under the control of the Defence Ministry. It was tasked with counterinsurgency, internal security, and supporting military operations.

The TEA were formed in September 1948, in the midst of the Greek Civil War, by decision of the Hellenic Army General Staff. They were staffed by men of proven "anticommunist" credentials.

They were abolished in 1982 by the socialist government of Andreas Papandreou, and replaced by the National Guard.

== See also ==
- Security Battalions
- Operation Gladio
