= Athanasios Frontistis =

Greek politician and soldier (1900–1979)

Athanasios Frontistis (Greek: Αθανάσιος Φροντιστής, 1900–1979) was a Greek Army officer who rose to the rank of Lieutenant General, and held the post of Chief of the Hellenic National Defence General Staff. He was also elected twice as an MP with the National Radical Union, and served briefly as Minister for Communications in April 1967.

== Biography ==
Born in Skiathos in 1900, Athanasios Frontistis entered the Hellenic Army Academy and was commissioned an officer in 1922. He fought in the Asia Minor Campaign, the Greco-Italian War, and the Greek Civil War. During the Axis occupation of Greece, he was a member of the Panhellenic Liberation Organization.

In 1959–62, with the rank of Lt. General, he served as Chief of the Hellenic National Defence General Staff.

After retirement, he was elected an MP for Magnesia Prefecture with the right-wing National Radical Union in the 1963 and 1964 elections.

He also served as Minister of Communications in the caretaker cabinet of Panagiotis Kanellopoulos in April 1967, that was abolished by the coup d'état of 21 April 1967.

He died in January 1979 and was buried in the First Cemetery of Athens.

Political offices
Preceded by Epameinondas Stasinopoulos	Minister for Communications of Greece; 3–21 April 1967	Succeeded by Dimitrios Oikonopoulos
Military offices
Preceded by Lt. General Konstantinos Dovas	Chief of the Hellenic National Defence General Staff; 1959 – 1962	Succeeded by Lt. General Ioannis Pipilis
