= Patrick de Rousiers =

French Air Force general

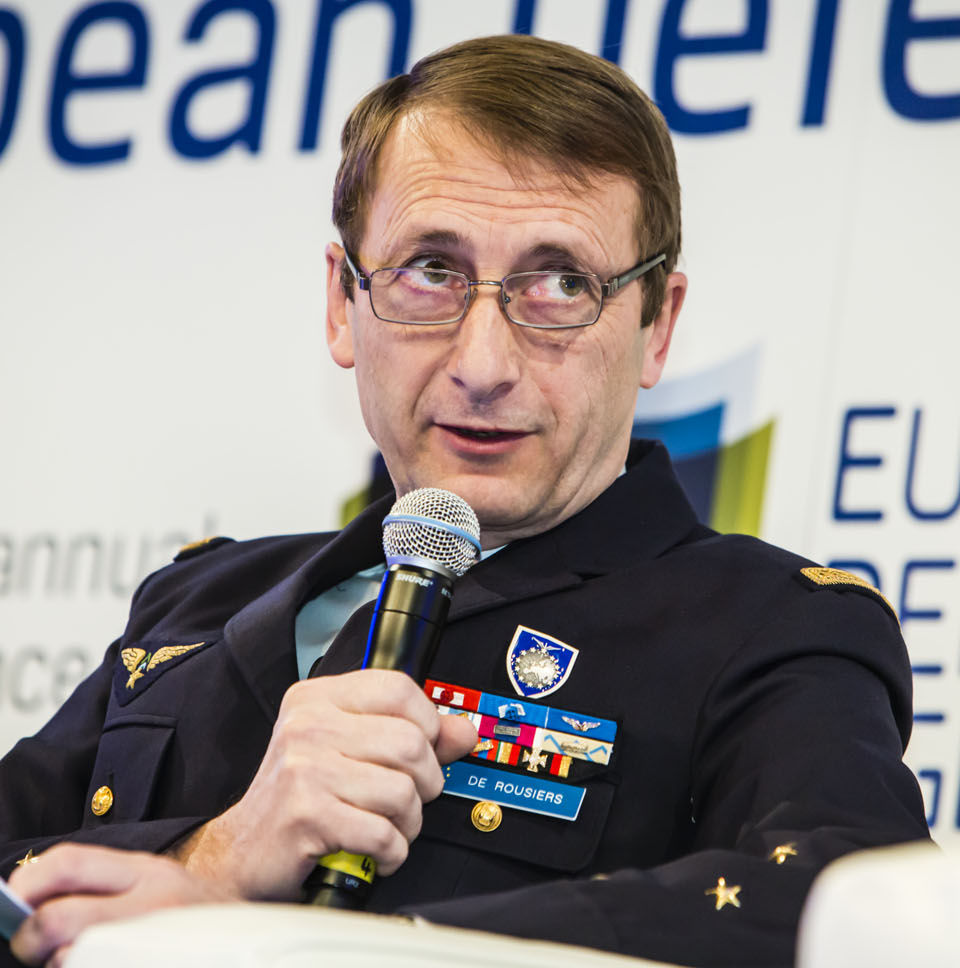
- Patrick de Rousiers in 2014
- Born: 11 May 1955 (age 70); Dijon, France
- Allegiance: France
- Branch: French Air Force
- Service years: 1975–2015
- Rank: Général d'armée aérienne
- Commands: Commander, Escadron de chasse 2/4 La Fayette; Commander, 33 Escadre de Reconnaissance; Commander, Nancy – Ochey Air Base; Commander, Air Defense and Air Operations Command
- Awards: Grand Officier de Légion d'honneur Commandeur de Ordre national du Mérite Médaille de l'Aéronautique

Patrick de Rousiers (born 11 May 1955 in Dijon, France), is a retired French Air Force general. His last position was serving as the Chairman of the European Union Military Committee, assuming that position from 6 November 2012 to 5 November 2015.

General de Rousiers is a Fighter pilot who has logged over 3,000 flying hours, with 2,600 of them in fighter jet aircraft. He has participated in 76 combat missions.

== Military career ==
General de Rousiers entered the French Air Force Academy in September 1975. He graduated and was awarded his pilot wings in Tours on 30 January 1979. His first posting was Cazaux Air Base to attend the operational fighter course for the Mystere IV. In June 1979, he joined Escadron de reconnaissance 1/33 Belfort stationed at Strasbourg - Entzheim Air Base, flying the Mirage IIIR. Upon completion of all professional qualifications, he was appointed commander of an Escadrille of Escadron de reconnaissance 2/33 Savoie which was scheduled to transition of the Mirage F1CR.

From May to July 1986, General de Rousiers led a Mirage F1 CR detachment in Chad. After returning from his African deployment, he was posted to Escadron de chasse 2/4 La Fayette, operating Mirage IIIE/AN52. He assumed command of the squadron in August 1988, where he led the squadron during its conversion to the Mirage 2000N/ASMP.

From August 1989 to June 1990, he attended the Command and Staff Course of the Canadian Forces in Toronto. Upon completion of the course, he returned to the Escadron de reconnaissance 1/33, as Chief of Operations. In the Fall of 1990, he was in command of the first Mirage F1 CR detachment deployed to Saudi Arabia, during Operation Desert Shield.

In the summer of 1991 he organized air operations during Operation Provide Comfort, while commanding a Mirage F1 CR detachment at Incirlik Air Base. He was ultimately placed in command of Escadron de reconnaissance 1/33 on the 27 August 1992.

Following a course of study at the l’École de Guerre from September 1993 to summer 1994, General de Rousiers was assigned to the Air Force Staff, General Plans, Planning office. Appointed as the head of this office on 4 September 1996, he participated in preparing the 1997-2002 Defense Spending Plan and in the programming review for the Minister of Defense.

On 2 September 1999, General de Rousiers assumed command of Nancy – Ochey Air Base From October to December 2001, during the war in Afghanistan, he was a member of the first French operational detachment to United States Central Command (CENTCOM) headquarters at MacDill Air Force Base. He served as an air force adviser for targeting.

In September 2002, General de Rousiers was promoted to Général de brigade aérienne. He moved to the Ministry of Defense/General Staff in Paris as Assistant to the Vice-Chief of Defense Staff and Head, Studies and General Military Strategy office. In September 2004, he became Head, Euro-Atlantic Division in the Defense Staff in Paris in charge of EU, NATO and UN relations. He was promoted to the rank of Général de division aérienne on 1 September 2005.

From 2006 to 2008 he was appointed Air Defense and Air operations Commander in chief, at Taverny, Paris and Lyon, France. He was promoted to the rank of Général de corps d'armée aérien on August 1, 2006.

In September 2008 he was posted to Brussels as the French military representative to the European Union Military Committee. He was subsequently dual hatted in 2009 as the French military representative to both the European Union and NATO Military Committee in Brussels.

From September 2010 to November 2012, General de Rousiers was the Inspector General of the Armed Forces (Air) and was promoted to the rank of Général d'armée aérienne. Serving in this capacity he variously served as head of an inter-agency working group in charge of a drafting and updating a white paper on "defense and security threats and challenges".

On 6 November 2012, General de Rousiers became the permanent Chairman of the European Union Military Committee (EUMC). His selection was made by the 27 EU Member States' Chiefs of Defence. He succeeded General Håkan Syrén of Sweden. As Chairman of the EUMC he led the work of the committee and liaised in the development and implementation of the committee's work. The Chairman is the spokesman for the EUMC, he participates in Political and Security Committee meetings as appropriate, he is the military adviser to the High Representative of the Union for Foreign Affairs and Security Policy who heads the European External Action Service, he represents the primary Point of Contact with the Operation Commanders of the EU's military operations and he attends Council meetings with defence and security implications. On 6 November 2015, he handed over the Chairmanship to General Mikhail Kostarakos, former Chief of the Hellenic National Defense General Staff.

== Honours ==
General de Rousiers is a Grand Officier of the Legion of Honor, a Commander of the National Order of Merit, and holds the French Aeronautical Medal, Overseas Medal, National Defence Medal, Medal of the Nation's Gratitude and the French commemorative medal. He is also a recipient of the German Ehrenkreuz der Bundeswehr in gold.

Military offices
Preceded by General Håkan Syrén	Chairman of the European Union Military Committee; 2012-2015	Succeeded by General Mikhail Kostarakos
