= Battle of Konitsa =

Conflict of the Greek Civil War

Date	December 24, 1947 – January 15, 1948
Location	Konitsa, Epirus, northwestern Greece
Result	Hellenic Army victory

Belligerents
Provisional Democratic Government: Democratic Army of Greece	Kingdom of Greece: Hellenic Army

Commanders and leaders
Markos Vafiadis; Georgios Sofianos	Colonel Konstantinos Dovas (WIA); Major Georgios Peridis

The Battle of Konitsa was a conflict of the Greek Civil War (1946-1949); between the Communist led Democratic Army of Greece and the Greek Army of the Kingdom of Greece. It was a failed initiative to capture the northwestern Greek town of Konitsa, in order to establish a capital for the Provisional Democratic Government; a rival authority to the recognized government in Athens. This was part of the communist "Operation Limnes" (Lakes) which aimed the capture of a major Greek town.

== Background ==
In March 1947, one year after the start of the Greek Civil War, the Democratic Army of Greece (DSE), founded and mainly supported by the Greek Communist Party, mainly controlled some mountainous pockets in Northern Greece and Peloponnese. It commanded an army of 13,000 troops with limited support by former ELAS fighters and an unknown network of civilians mainly in towns and villages throughout Greece. At the same time, the spearhead of the former People's Greek Liberation Army (ELAS), ca. 100,000 people were imprisoned or exiled in small islands. By mid-1947, the force of DSE had grown to 23,000 in battalions, regiments and brigades formed after the ex-ELAS structure with 1 General HQ in the North and 3 Regional HQs in the rest of the country. A provisional government was founded as the counterpart of the recognized government of Athens, and gain the silent support of the Socialist governments in Bulgaria, Albania and Yugoslavia.

However, DSE did not manage to control any major cities, and DSE High Staff, decided to make the town of Konitsa, 8 miles from the Albanian border, the capital of the Democratic Provisional Government. If DSE could control a major city with a considerable area, they could still hope for the recognition of a northern Greek Communist State by the Soviet Union and other communist countries.

== Battle ==
The townspeople of Konitsa, contrary to Vafiadis' expectations, sided with the Athens government and fortified their town against DSE, fighting alongside the government army. To this, helped also the "scorched earth" policy of the Governmental Army in the areas around major towns, that was emptying all villages from their inhabitants, bringing them into fortified towns and calling them "refugees due to guerilla activity" (συμμοριόπληκτοι).

DSE attacked the bridge of Bourazani spanning the Aoos River, to cut off government forces in the regional capital Ioannina from the town. The government flew in troops in DC-3s provided by civilian airliners.

Despite the assistance of 105mm artillery provided by Albania, the communists were defeated. During the battle, Queen Frederica visited the town, welcomed by colonel Dovas.

== Aftermath ==
The government army, totaling 200,000 strong (8 divisions and 3 independent brigades), with artillery, armor, aircraft and Anglo-American assistance, far outnumbered DSE forces.
