= National Guard (Greece) =

- Εθνοφυλακή
- Founded: 1982 (current form)
- Country: Greece
- Allegiance: Hellenic Republic
- Branch: Hellenic Army
- Type: Land Forces
- Role: National Defence
- Part of: Hellenic Armed Forces
- Motto: "Defend from enemies"
- Website: https://ethnofilaki.army.gr

The National Guard (Greek: Εθνοφυλακή, romanized: Ethnofylakí) is part of the Hellenic Army and are voluntary corps, mainly located in areas near the frontiers, consisted of trained and armed volunteer men (and since 2019 women).

== Historical background ==
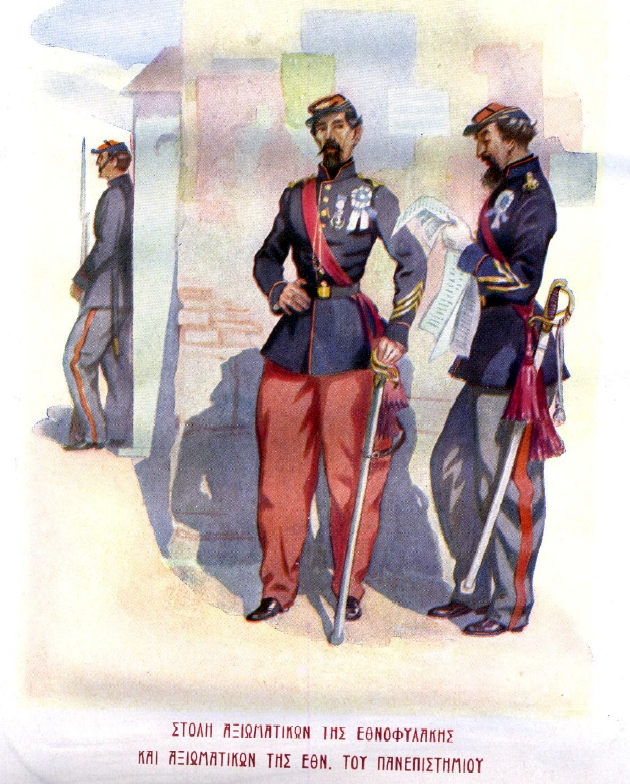
Men of the National Guard in the interregnum after the overthrow of Otto (1862–1863)

The first unit in the Greek army with the name of "National Guard" was established in 1843 during the early reign of Otto of Greece. It was a voluntary unit, and consisted of men 18-24 years old.

Much later, in 1948, during the Greek Civil War were established the National Guard Defence Battalions (TEA), with a strongly anticommunist orientation. Their mission was supporting the regular Hellenic Army in national defence and internal security.

== Present form ==
Due to their hard-line right-wing orientation, the TEA were disestablished in 1982 by the government of Andreas Papandreou, and replaced with the National Guard.
