= Konstantinos Dovas =

Greek military officer and politician (1898–1973)

- Κωνσταντίνος Δόβας

Prime Minister of Greece
- In office 20 September 1961 – 4 November 1961
- Monarch: Paul
- Preceded by: Konstantinos Karamanlis
- Succeeded by: Konstantinos Karamanlis

Personal details
- Born: 20 December 1898 Konitsa, Janina Vilayet, Ottoman Empire (now Greece)
- Died: 24 July 1973 (aged 74) Athens, Greece
- Resting place: First Cemetery of Athens
- Education: Hellenic Military Academy

Military service
- Allegiance: Kingdom of Greece; (Greece) Second Hellenic Republic
- Branch/service: Hellenic Army
- Years of service: 1918–1961
- Rank: Lieutenant General
- Commands: Chief of the Hellenic National Defense General Staff
- Battles/wars: World War I: Macedonian front; Greco-Turkish War (1919-1922); World War II: Greco-Italian War; Battle of Greece; Greek Civil War: Battle of Konitsa

Konstantinos Dovas (Greek: Κωνσταντίνος Δόβας; 20 December 1898 – 24 July 1973) was a Greek general and interim Prime Minister.

Dovas was born in Konitsa, in the Janina Vilayet of the Ottoman Empire (present-day northwestern Greece). In 1918, Dovas graduated from the Hellenic Military Academy. During the Greek Civil War between the government and the communist Democratic Army of Greece, he led the resistance of the Konitsa garrison during the Battle of Konitsa. Subsequently, he rose from the rank of Lieutenant General (1954) to Chief of the Hellenic National Defense General Staff.

During his term of office, on 25 March 1955 an agreement between the Army and the CIA on the establishment of a special force entitled "Sheepskin" was made, which subsequently became the Greek component of Gladio, a secret organisation of NATO, CIA and MI6.

After his retirement from the army, he was Chief of the Royal Household of King Paul of Greece.

From 20 September to 4 November 1961, Dovas was prime minister in a transitional government.

Following the 1967 coup d'etat, he was part of a failed counter-coup planned by King Constantine II.

Political offices
Preceded by Konstantinos Karamanlis	Prime Minister of Greece; 20 September – 4 November 1961	Succeeded by Konstantinos Karamanlis
Military offices
Preceded by Lt. General Stylianos Kitrilakis	Chief of the Hellenic National Defense General Staff; 1954–1959	Succeeded by Lt General Athanasios Frontistis
