= Conscription in Greece =

Since 1914, Greece (or the Hellenic Republic) has had mandatory military service (conscription) of 12 months in the Army, Navy or the Air Force for men between the age of 19 to 45. Citizens discharged from active service are normally placed in the Reserve and are subject to periodic recall of 1–10 days at irregular intervals.

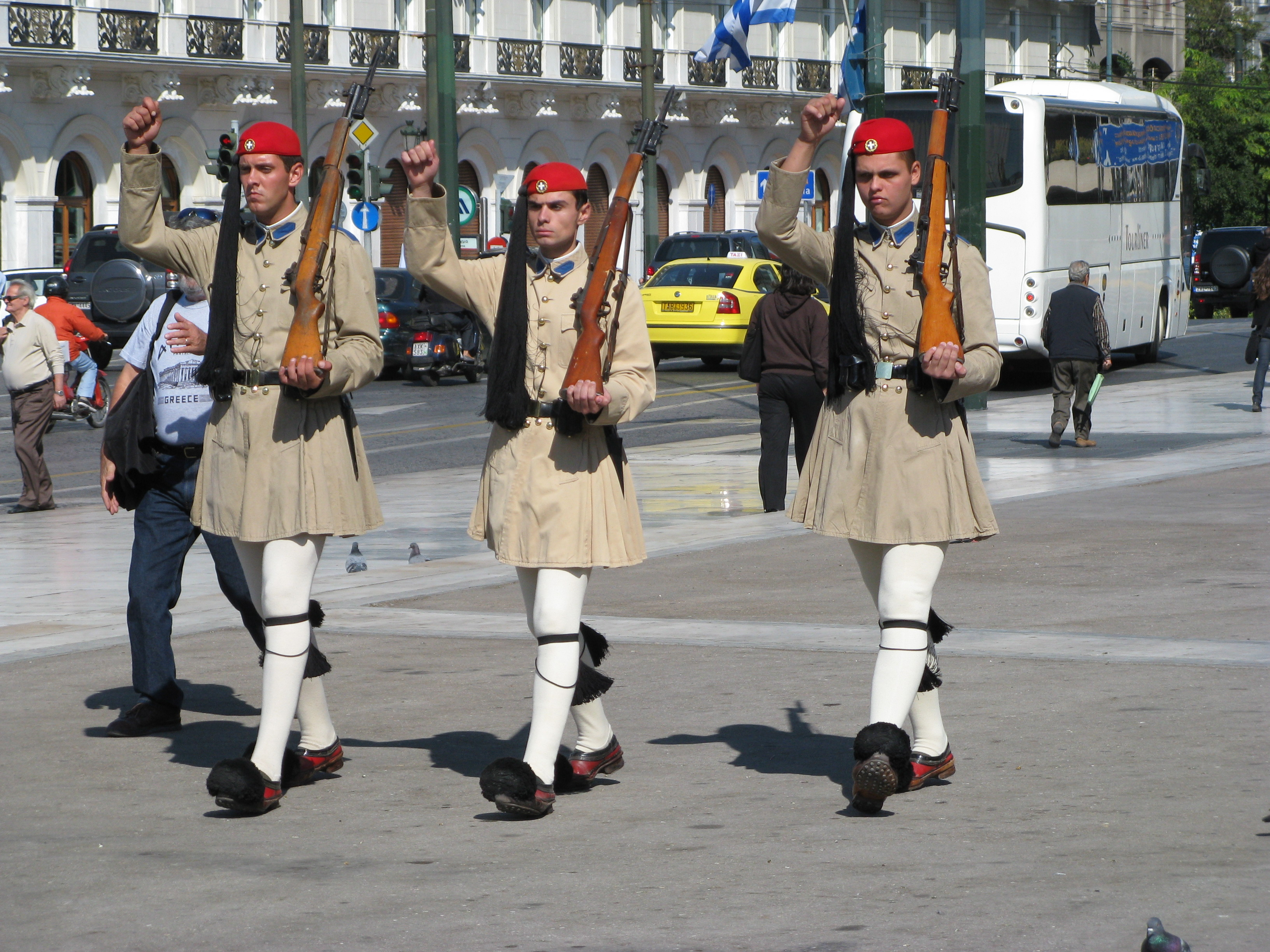
Evzones of the Presidential Guard in front of the Greek Parliament armed with M1 Garands.

== Duration ==
Universal conscription was introduced in Greece during the military reforms of 1909, although various forms of selective draft had been in place earlier. In more recent years, conscription was associated with the state of general mobilisation declared on July 20, 1974, due to the Turkish invasion of Cyprus (the mobilisation was formally ended on December 18, 2002).

The length of a tour has varied historically, between 12 and 36 months depending on various factors particular to the conscript, and the political situation. Although women are accepted into the Greek army on a voluntary basis, they are not required to enlist, as men are. Soldiers receive no health insurance, but they are provided medical support during their army service, including hospitalization costs.

Between 2009 and 2021, Greece had a mandatory military service of 9 months for the Army and 12 months for the Navy and the Air Force. This applied to citizens between the ages of 19 and 45. However, as the Armed forces had been gearing towards a complete professional army system, the government had promised that the mandatory military service would be cut to 6 months by 2008 or even abolished completely. However, this did not occur due to severe manpower shortages. These were caused by a combination of (a) financial difficulties, which meant that professional soldiers could not be hired at the projected rate, and (b) widespread abuse of the deferment process, which meant that 66% of the draftees deferred service in 2005. The number of conscripts affected to the Navy and the Air Force was greatly reduced, with an aim towards full professionalisation.

As of May 2021, mandatory military service in the Hellenic Army was once again raised to 12 months for all males aged 19–45, unless serving in units in Evros, the North Aegean Region or the islands of Kalymnos, Karpathos-Kasos, Kos and Rhodes, plus ELDYK, where duration was kept at 9 months.

Under the "Agenda 2030" reform (Law 5265/2026), the training period was extended from 4 to 10 weeks, no recruits will be assigned to the Navy and Air Force, excluding holders of certain degrees who may be transferred after basic training upon request. The 9-month reduced service was extended to include the totality of Thrace, and all recruits will serve for about 3.5 months in border regions (transfer applications being possible after the completion of 6 months from induction). Women aged 20-26 may also serve voluntarily, gaining awarded points in recruitment competitions for Professional Soldiers (EPOP).

Greek males between the age of 18 and 75 may be required to serve part-time in the National Guard (Greek: Εθνοφυλακή, romanized: Ethnofylaki) if needed during a crisis or war. Service in the Guard is paid.

In 1998, the Greek Parliament voted law 2641 which mandated enrollment of Greek men and women between 18 and 60 years of age into a Civil Defence Organisation (Greek: Παλλαϊκή Άμυνα, romanized: Palaiki Amina, lit. 'Total People's Defence' abbr. ΠΑΜ). It was envisaged that the Civil Defence Organisation would respond to enemy action, natural disasters and all sorts of emergencies, but the law has not been enforced.

=== Reserve officers ===
Reserve Officers are selected from conscripts who meet the required educational, physical and psychological standards. Under the current framework, candidates for Reserve Officer Cadet status are selected exclusively from holders of a degree or diploma from a university or technological higher-education institution in Greece, or from holders of an academically equivalent or equal foreign qualification. This replaces the older practice under which possession of a Lykeion diploma could be sufficient for consideration.

Candidates undergo a selection process that includes medical, athletic and psycho-technical testing. Those who are accepted as Reserve Officer Cadets undergo a longer training period than ordinary conscripts before being appointed Δόκιμοι Έφεδροι Αξιωματικοί, or ΔΕΑ, usually rendered in English as Probationary Reserve Officers. Current Army guidance continues to describe the selection process as involving educational assessment, physical and mental health checks, athletic tests and psychotechnical tests, although some older Army informational material still contains outdated figures for service length and pay.

Service as a ΔΕΑ differs from ordinary conscript service. Reserve Officer Cadets and ΔΕΑ receive more demanding leadership-oriented training and, after appointment as ΔΕΑ, may receive officer-style privileges such as different accommodation and access to officers’ messes. Under Law 5265/2026, ΔΕΑ of all branches are named Reserve Officers three months before final discharge; ΔΕΑ doctors of the Medical Corps are named Reserve Officers after six months of real military service.

The duration of service has also changed. ΔΕΑ/Reserve Officers of the Army, Navy and Air Force are discharged after completing 14 months of real military service. This is reduced to 12 months for Army ΔΕΑ/Reserve Second Lieutenants who, after completing their training, serve the rest of their obligation in specified frontier areas, in Cyprus, or in Special Forces units as commandos or marines. Similar 12-month rules apply to the corresponding Navy and Air Force reserve officer categories when they serve in the specified units or ships.

Pay is now defined by the special military pay scale. ΔΕΑ receive 70% of the basic salary of the entry pay step of Category A, while Reserve Second Lieutenants from ΔΕΑ receive 94% of that basic salary. Following the public-sector salary adjustment from 1 April 2026, the basic monthly salary for ΔΕΑ is given as €952. Additional allowances are limited to those specifically provided by law and depend on the circumstances of service.

=== Reduced tour ===
Conscripts may serve a reduced tour for various reasons. Some common categories of conscripts serving reduced tours are:

- Citizens who have been living constantly abroad since their eleventh birthday and whose parents are not employed by the Greek state are required to serve three months.
- Citizens who moved to Greece before their eleventh birthday from Albania, Turkey or countries of the former Soviet Union (except Estonia, Latvia, Lithuania). These conscripts are required to serve three months.
- Scientists involved in outstanding research may serve three to six months, but are required to buy off the remaining duration of the normal tour (24 months) at 293,47 euros per month not served. These conscripts may fulfill their military obligations in disjointed tours of two months.
- All brothers of large families (4 children or more) serve for six months.
- Citizens whose income is required to support family members (such as children, elderly parents or younger siblings) usually serve an eight-month tour. In most cases this only applies to the oldest male members of the family who are capable of generating income.
- The first son in a family where the father is past the age of 70 or has died serve an 8-month tour.

=== Permanent deferment ===
The following categories of citizens are not required to serve in the armed forces of Greece:

- Women; (albeit they may do so on a voluntary basis)
- People with serious health problems, including the mentally ill;
- Fathers of three or more children;
- The eldest sons in families, whose members cannot support themselves;
- Fathers whose wives have died or are incapable of work and whose children cannot support themselves;
- Foreigners living in the Monastic community of Mount Athos.

=== Conscientious objectors ===
Since 1998, conscripts who refuse to serve in the army for ideological or religious reasons as conscientious objectors may apply for alternative civilian service. The full alternative service duration is 15 months compared to the full military service which is 12 months or 9 months when served at Greek borders.

Recognized conscientious objectors serve in institutions of the broader public sector, such as hospitals, postal services, social care services, or the public administration. Those serving alternative service shall receive food and accommodation by the receiving institution or a living expenses stipend of about 220 euros per month, with the latter case being the most common.

The recognition of conscientious objectors and their placement to institutions of the broader public sector that have declared vacancies is under the powers of the Ministry of Defence. The Ministry may refuse to recognize an applicant on grounds of failing to meet formal requirements, such as not owning a gun license, or by judging that his stated beliefs were not sufficiently proven to be sincere or serious or consistent to a general attitude to life.

This practice and certain aspects of the alternative service have been found by European and UN bodies to be discriminatory or punitive, according to international standards.

=== Draft evaders and citizens living abroad ===
Draft evaders living in Greece are not allowed to leave the country. Prior to 2002, the passports of draft evaders living outside Greece were not renewed after the expiration of the original. Upon re-entering Greece, these people were generally forced to conscribe. However, in 2002, the right was granted to all Greek citizens to be issued passports, regardless of their draft status. In 2004, partial amnesty was granted to draft evaders, allowing them to visit Greece for up to 30 days in a single calendar year.

Greek military law allows Permanent Residents Abroad to defer military service until repatriation to Greece. Until 2005, Permanent Residents Abroad status (for draft purposes) was only granted to persons who had been born abroad or who had moved abroad before the age of eleven and to those who had immigrated to a specific set of countries before 1997. This definition excluded many thousands of citizens who were living abroad and who were regarded as 'draft evaders' by the authorities. The law was amended at the end of 2005 to grant Permanent Resident Abroad status to persons who have lived abroad for at least eleven years, or have worked abroad for at least seven years.

== Aspects of military life ==
=== Training ===
Military training in the Hellenic Army consists of three cycles. The first cycle includes Basic (lasting 6 weeks) and Specialist Training (lasting 3–7 weeks). Basic and Specialist training take place in dedicated training facilities. The second training cycle is conducted in combat units, and lasts for 6 months. The third phase of training comprises the remainder of a conscript's tour and also carried out in regular army units.

According to current standing orders, conscripts are required to train for a total of 7½ hours daily. However, a large number of conscripts are excused from training as they are on secondment to other assignments such as security or clerical and menial work.

=== Duties ===
Apart from their military training, draftees also have other duties such as cleaning the camp, making food, serving other draftees in the military restaurants, et cetera. In the case of an emergency, draftees might be called upon for assistance in forest fires or other natural disasters.

=== Accommodation ===
Draftees live in barracks. Each barracks contains its own toilet facilities and sometimes its own canteen. The barracks are divided into dorms each providing accommodation for a varying number of draftees, depending on the military installation; this number can be as little as 3 draftees in remote outposts or as high as 75, such as the dorms of the Hellenic Air Force's 124 Basic Training Wing.

=== Leaves of absence ===
During their tour, conscripts are entitled to a total of 18 days leave of absence. Farmers and students serving in the armed forces may be excused from their duties for an additional 18 days (maximum). Parents are entitled to extra five days of leave per child. Up to ten days of leave can be awarded for outstanding performance, at the commanding officer's discretion. Conscripts may be awarded leave for health reasons, performing hazardous duties, NGO work or other reasons. In addition, it is current practice to award two days of leave per month of service in front-line units, although there is no explicit provision for this in the conscription law. In practice, all these breaks are usually taken in small blocks rather than long holidays.

== Financial repercussions ==
Conscripts are unsalaried, but nominal financial aid is provided, ranging from approximately 50 euros per month (for soldiers serving outside the border districts) to 600 euros (for designate officers), depending on the conscripts' rank and family status. This aid is not technically considered a salary: it is intended to help draftees with various unforeseen expenses, which are not normally covered by the military (i.e. expenses other than food, accommodation, clothing, and some transport fees).

In 2004, the Greek Parliament passed a law stating that men over the age of 35 would be allowed to buy off their military obligation after attending 45 days of basic training, with the amount required to do this being 8,505 euro (810 euro for every month not served), calculated based on the income of professional soldiers adjusted for taxes. Therefore, it is considered as indirect taxation, on out-of-country and re-repatriated Greeks, as that amount is basically salary for an entire year in Greece. In 2026, the legal framework around buyouts was revised, with the minimum age now being 40, minimum service reduced to 20 days and the amount increased to 1.500 euros per month.

== Attitude towards conscription and conscripts (draftees) ==
The military has a strong part in Greek society and structure, and is generally regarded as one of the most trustworthy institutions in the country. Among more traditional sectors of society, such as those in rural regions, national service has been historically perceived as a rite of passage. Mandatory military service is often perceived as part of the "natural" order of life, and as a final school of socialization and maturing for young Greek men before the real world. This mindset is still present in modern times.

However, in recent decades, military service has become unpopular among some segments of society, particularly many living in urban communities. Some draftees consider conscription a waste of time. There have also been incidents of conscripts being used for jobs outside their normal mandate, such as fighting forest fires (without protective equipment). Thus the Greek Ministry of Defense has stated that one out of three men eligible for conscription never showed up for their tour. Draft evaders living in Greece have risen to 30,000. The number of young men trying to achieve permanent deferment by stating (usually mental) health problems has also increased in recent years.

The average age of draftees is higher than in the past, where conscripts tended to be 18–20 years old. Nowadays, conscripts are commonly in their mid-twenties, and many have university-level education prior to conscription. In past generations, the army would often be the first time a young male adult would find himself on his own and away from home; nowadays this has by and large been replaced by Higher Education studies.

In recent years, many people perceive it as both a human rights violation and a way for the government to improve unemployment rates without actually creating new jobs, since people that are serving are paid an insignificant amount and are considered working employees by the state.

== See also ==
- Loafing and Camouflage (Loufa kai Parallaghi Λούφα και παραλλαγή) by movie director Nikos Perakis
