= Nikolaos Panagiotopoulos =

Greek politician (born 1965)

- Νικόλαος Παναγιωτόπουλος
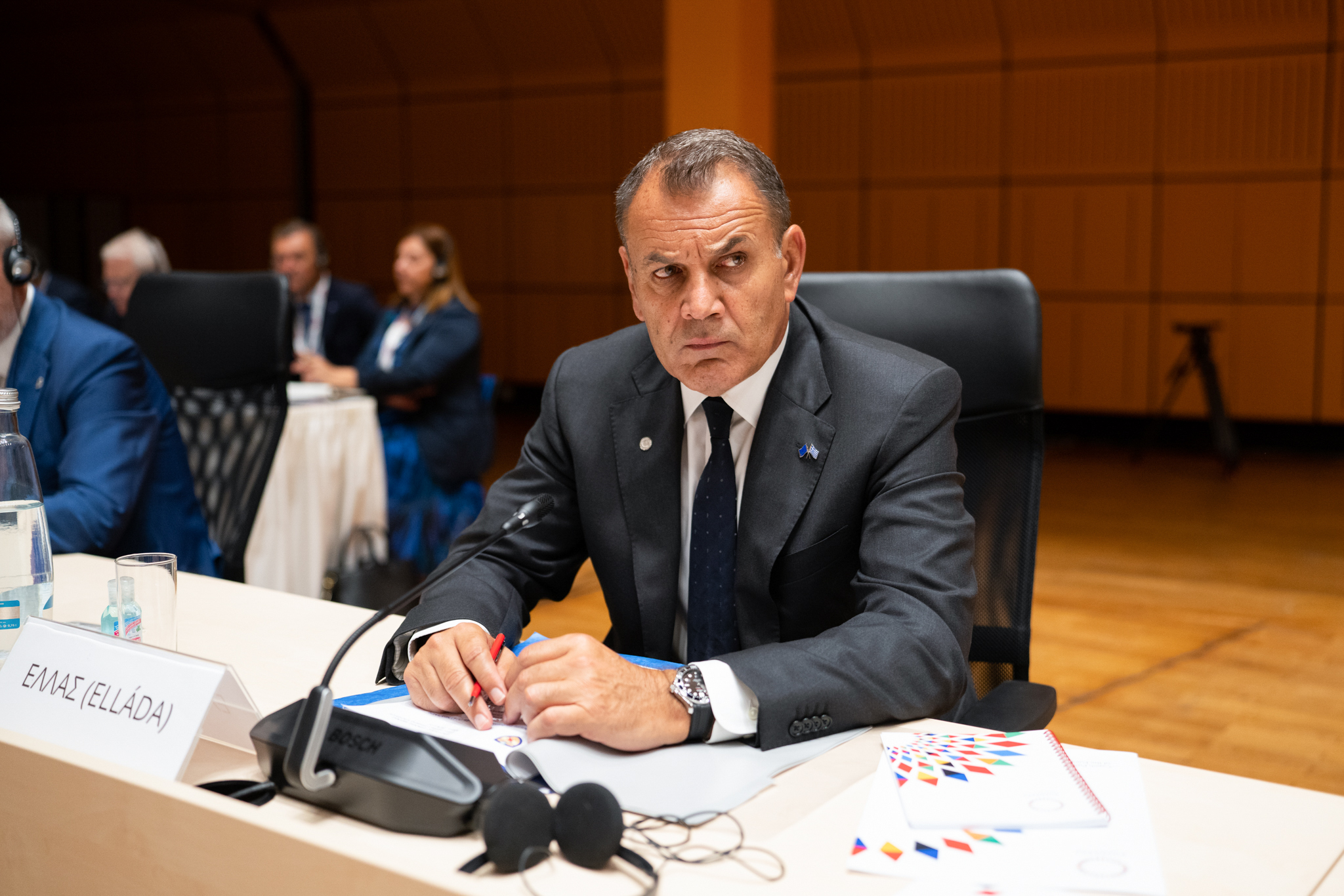
- Panagiotopoulos in 2022

Minister for National Defence
- In office 9 July 2019 – 26 May 2023
- Prime Minister: Kyriakos Mitsotakis
- Preceded by: Evangelos Apostolakis
- Succeeded by: Alkiviadis Stefanis

Personal details
- Born: 18 August 1965 (age 60)
- Party: New Democracy
- Website: npanagiotopoulos.gr

Nikolaos Panagiotopoulos (Greek: Νικόλαος Παναγιωτόπουλος; born 18 August 1965 in Kavala) is a Greek politician of the New Democracy party who served as Minister for National Defence in the cabinet of Prime Minister Kyriakos Mitsotakis from 2019 to 2023.

== Political career ==
During Panagiotopoulos' time in office, the Greek parliament approved the purchase of six new and 12 used Dassault Rafale fighter aircraft from France for 2.5 billion euros ($3.04 billion) in January 2021. Later that year, he led efforts on a defence pact between Greece and France, a NATO ally, whereby they would come to each other's aid in the event of an external threat. The pact included an order for three French frigates worth 3 billion euros.

In the June 2023 Greek legislative election, he was elected to the Hellenic Parliament from Kavala.
