= Dimitrios Grapsas =

Greek military officer

- Born: 1948; Ypati
- Allegiance: Greece
- Service / branch: Hellenic Army
- Years of service: 1971–2009
- Rank: General
- Commands: Chief of the Hellenic National Defence General Staff; Chief of the Hellenic Army General Staff
- Awards: Order of Honour, Order of the Phoenix, Medal of Military Merit, Commendation Medal of Merit and Honour, Staff Officer Service Commendation Medal

General Dimitrios Grapsas (Greek: Δημήτριος Γράψας) is a Greek military officer, who served as the Chief of the Hellenic National Defense General Staff from August 2007 to August 2009.

== Biography ==
General Grapsas was born in 1948 in Ypati in the Phthiotis prefecture. He was admitted to the Hellenic Military Academy in 1967, from which he graduated in 1971 as a Second Lieutenant (Armour).

In the following years he was promoted to the rank of lieutenant (1971), captain (1978), major (1983), lieutenant colonel (1989), and colonel (1995). During that time he served successively in the following units and formations:

- Commander of the D' Armored Reconnaissance Battalion (Δ' Επιλαρχία Αναγνωρίσεως – Δ' ΕΑΝ)
- Chief of Staff of the 96 Military Command (96 Στρατιωτική Διοίκηση – 96 ΣΔΙ)
- First Assistant Chief of Staff of the Higher Military Command of the Interior and the Islands (Ανωτάτη Στρατιωτική Διοίκηση Εσωτερικού και Νήσων – ΑΣΔΕΝ)

He attained the rank of brigadier general in 1999 and received command of the XXV Armored Brigade (XXV Τεθωρακισμένη Ταξιαρχία). Following that, he served as Chief of Staff in D' Army Corps (Δ' Σώμα Στρατού), and as a Director of the Training Division of the HAGS (ΔΕΚΠ/ΓΕΣ). In 2002, he was appointed as the director of the Training and Doctrine Staff Directorate of the HAGS. In 2003, having been promoted to major general, he received command of the 12th Mechanized Infantry Division (12η Μ/Κ ΜΠ). In 2004, he was promoted to lieutenant general and was assigned as B' Deputy Chief of the HAGS (Β' Υπαρχηγός ΓΕΣ). In 2005, he became commander of the Higher Military Command of the Interior and the Islands (ΑΣΔΕΝ) and held the post until his appointment to chief of staff of the Hellenic Army General Staff (Α/ΓΕΣ) on 28 February 2006. In August 2007 he was assigned Chief of the Hellenic National Defense General Staff (Γενικό Επιτελείο Εθνικής Άμυνας- ΓΕΕΘΑ) after the resignation of Panagiotis Chinofotis and promoted to general. He held this post until 6 August 2009, when he was replaced by Air Chief Marshal Ioannis Giagkos.

== Medals and decorations ==
General Grapsas has been decorated with the following distinctions: the Grand Cross of the Order of The Phoenix (Μεγαλόσταυρος του Τάγματος του Φοίνικα), the Grand Commander of the Order of Honour (Ανώτερος Ταξιάρχης του Τάγματος της Τιμής), Medal of Military Merit 1st Class (Mετάλλιο Στρατιωτικής Αξίας Α΄ Τάξεως), Chief of General Staff Commendation Medal (Διαμνημόνευση Αρχηγίας Γ.Ε.ΕΘ.Α), Chief of the Army Commendation Medal (Διαμνημόνευση Αρχηγίας Γ.Ε.Σ), Commendation Star of Merit and Honour (Αστέρας Αξίας και Τιμής), Commendation Medal of Merit and Honour (Διαμνημόνευση Αξίας και Τιμής), Major Unit Command Commendation Medal 1st Class (Διαμηνμόνευση Ηγεσίας Σχηματιμού-Μεγάλης Μονάδος Α΄ Τάξεως, Army Meritorious Command Medal 1st Class (Διαμνημόνευση Ευδοκίμου Διοικήσεως Α΄ Τάξεως), Staff Officer Service Commendation Medal 1st Class (Διαμνημόνευση Υπηρεσιών Αξιωματικού Επιτελούς Α΄ Τάξεως). Additionally he was awarded the United States Of America Medal of the Commander of the Legion of Merit.

Military offices
Preceded by Lt General Nikolaos Douvas	Chief of the Hellenic Army General Staff; 2006–2007	Succeeded by Lt General Dimitrios Voulgaris
Preceded by Admiral Panagiotis Chinofotis	Chief of Hellenic National Defense General Staff; 2007–2009	Succeeded by Air Chief Marshal Ioannis Giagkos
