= Hellenic National Defence General Staff =

Highest staff organization in the Hellenic Armed Forces

- Γενικό Επιτελείο Εθνικής Άμυνας
- Emblem of the Hellenic National Defence General Staff. The Corinthian helmet represents the Hellenic Army, the anchor the Hellenic Navy, and the wings the Hellenic Air Force
- Founded: 11 April 1950 (76 years, 5 months ago)
- Country: Greece
- Type: Military staff
- Part of: Hellenic Armed Forces
- Headquarters: Ministry of National Defence, Psychiko, Athens, Greece
- Mottos: Ever to Excel; Αἰὲν Ἀριστεύειν; Een aristevin
- Website: www.geetha.mil.gr

Commanders
- Chief: General Dimitrios Choupis
- Deputy Chief: Vice Admiral Theodoros Mikropoulos
- Chief of Staff: Lieutenant General Konstantinos Bouzos
- Notable commanders: Field Marshal Alexandros Papagos

Insignia
- Abbreviation: ΓΕΕΘΑ ("HNDGS")
- Flag

The Hellenic National Defence General Staff (Greek: Γενικό Επιτελείο Εθνικής Άμυνας, romanized: Genikó Epiteleío Ethnikī́s Ámynas, abbr. ΓΕΕΘΑ) is the senior staff of the Hellenic Armed Forces. It was established in 1950, when the separate armed services ministries were consolidated into the Ministry of National Defence. Its role in peacetime was as a coordinating and senior consultative body at the disposal of the Greek government, and in wartime as the overall headquarters of the Armed Forces. In recent years, through ongoing efforts at increased inter-services cooperation and integration, the HNDGS has assumed peacetime operational control over the separate branches. Between 19 December 1968 and 10 August 1977, the HNDGS was abolished, and the Armed Forces Headquarters (Greek: Αρχηγείο Ενόπλων Δυνάμεων, romanized: Archīgeío Enóplōn Dynámeōn, abbr. Greek: ΑΕΔ) established in its place.

== The Chief of the HNDGS ==
The Chief of the Hellenic National Defence General Staff (Αρχηγός ΓΕΕΘΑ, Α/ΓΕΕΘΑ) conducts the HNDGS and is the main adviser to the Government Council for Foreign Affairs and Defence (KYSEA) and to the Minister of Defence on military issues. Through the Chiefs of General Staffs, he carries out the operational commanding of the Joint Headquarters and the units that come under them, as well as the rest forces, when it comes to the issues of operation plans implementation and the Crises management System implementation, conduction of operations outside the national territory and participation of the Armed Forces in the confrontation of special situations during peace time.

He constructs the National Military Strategy after taking into consideration the suggestions of the General Staffs of the Armed Forces Services and according to the directions of the Ministry of Defence he manages and proposes the priority of the armament programs and suggests the general policy directions and priorities on every operational objective.

Traditionally, since c. 1970, the Chief of the HNDGS holds the rank of full general, admiral or air chief marshal, and is the only serving four-star officer of the Hellenic Armed Forces (as opposed to retired, since three-star ranks are often promoted one rank on retirement).

Since 12 January 2024, the incumbent Chief of the HNDGS is General Dimitrios Choupis.

Rank flag of the Chief of the HNDGS (Army variant)

Rank flag of the Chief of the HNDGS (Navy variant)

Rank flag of the Chief of the HNDGS (Air Force variant)

=== List of chiefs of the HNDGS ===
No.	Portrait	Chief of the HNDGS	Took office	Left office	Time in office	Defence branch	Ref.
1	Alexandros Papagos	Field Marshal; Alexandros Papagos (1883–1955) (Note: Resigned to found Greek Rally party.)	1950	1951	0–1 years	Hellenic Army	–
2	Theodotos Grigoropoulos	Lieutenant general Theodotos Grigoropoulos	1951	1952	0–1 years	Hellenic Army	–
3	Stylianos Kitrilakis [el]	Lieutenant general Stylianos Kitrilakis (1896–1964)	1952	1954	1–2 years	Hellenic Army	–
4	Konstantinos Dovas	Lieutenant general Konstantinos Dovas (1898–1973)	1954	1959	4–5 years	Hellenic Army	–
5	Athanasios Frontistis	Lieutenant general Athanasios Frontistis (1900–1979)	1959	1962	2–3 years	Hellenic Army	–
6	Ioannis Pipilis [el]	Lieutenant general Ioannis Pipilis (1903–1992)	1962	1965	2–3 years	Hellenic Army	–
7	Konstantinos Tsolakas	Lieutenant general Konstantinos Tsolakas	1965	1967	1–2 years	Hellenic Army	–
8	Spyridon Avgeris	Vice admiral Spyridon Avgeris (1909–1972) (Note: Held the post at the time of the coup d'état in April 1967 which established the military regime. Dismissed by the military regime following the failed counter-coup of King Constantine II in December 1967.)	30 March 1967	14 December 1967	259 days	Hellenic Navy	–
9	Odysseas Angelis	General; Odysseas Angelis (1912–1987) (Note: Installed by the military regime. "Chief of the Armed Forces" from December 1968.)	1967	16 August 1973	5–6 years	Hellenic Army	–
10	Dimitrios Zagorianakos [el]	General; Dimitrios Zagorianakos (1918–1977) (Note: Chief of the Armed Forces during the military regime. Held the post at the time of the Athens Polytechnic uprising in November 1973. Dismissed following the coup of Brigadier Dimitrios Ioannidis.)	16 August 1973	25 November 1973	101 days	Hellenic Army	–
11	Grigorios Bonanos	General; Grigorios Bonanos (Note: Chief of the Armed Forces during the military regime.)	25 November 1973	1974	0–1 years	Hellenic Army	–
12	Dionysios Arbouzis	General; Dionysios Arbouzis (1913–1987) (Note: Chief of the Armed Forces following the fall of the military regime.)	1974	1976	1–2 years	Hellenic Army	–
13	Ioannis Davos	General; Ioannis Davos (1918–2008) (Note: Chief of the Armed Forces, from August 1977 Chief of the re-formed HNDGS.)	14 September 1976	10 January 1980	3 years, 118 days	Hellenic Army	–
14	Agamemnon Gratzios	General; Agamemnon Gratzios (1922–1993)	11 January 1980	19 January 1982	2 years, 8 days	Hellenic Army	–
15	Theodoros Degiannis	Admiral; Theodoros Degiannis (1926–2006)	1982	1984	1–2 years	Hellenic Navy	–
16	Nikolaos Kouris [el]	Air Chief Marshal; Nikolaos Kouris (1930–2018)	1984	1989	4–5 years	Hellenic Air Force	–
17	Stamatis Vellidis	General; Stamatis Vellidis (1928–2021)	1989	1990	0–1 years	Hellenic Army	–
18	Ioannis Veryvakis	General; Ioannis Veryvakis (1930–2019)	1990	16 October 1993	2–3 years	Hellenic Army	–
19	Dimitrios Skarvelis [el]	General; Dimitrios Skarvelis (born 1933)	16 October 1993	16 December 1993	61 days	Hellenic Army	–
20	Christos Lymberis [el]	Admiral; Christos Lymberis (born 1935) (Note: Dismissed following the Imia crisis.)	16 December 1993	1996	2–3 years	Hellenic Navy	–
21	Athanasios Tzoganis	Air Chief Marshal; Athanasios Tzoganis (born 1939)	1996	1999	2–3 years	Hellenic Air Force	–
22	Manousos Paragioudakis [el]	General; Manousos Paragioudakis (born 1938)	1999	2002	2–3 years	Hellenic Army	–
23	Georgios Antonakopoulos [el]	General; Georgios Antonakopoulos (born 1943)	2002	16 February 2005	2–3 years	Hellenic Army	–
24	Panagiotis Chinofotis	Admiral; Panagiotis Chinofotis (born 1949)	16 February 2005	21 August 2007	2 years, 186 days	Hellenic Navy	–
25	Dimitrios Grapsas	General; Dimitrios Grapsas (born 1948)	21 August 2007	6 August 2009	1 year, 350 days	Hellenic Army	–
26	Ioannis Giangos	Air Chief Marshal; Ioannis Giangos (born 1951)	6 August 2009	1 November 2011	2 years, 87 days	Hellenic Air Force	–
27	Michail Kostarakos	General; Michail Kostarakos (1956–2023)	1 November 2011	15 December 2015	4 years, 44 days	Hellenic Army	–
28	Evangelos Apostolakis	Admiral; Evangelos Apostolakis (born 1957)	15 December 2015	14 January 2019	3 years, 30 days	Hellenic Navy	–
–	Konstantinos Floros	Lieutenant General; Konstantinos Floros (born 1961); Acting	14 January 2019	25 January 2019	11 days	Hellenic Army	–
29	Christos Christodoulou [el]	Air Chief Marshal; Christos Christodoulou (born 1958)	25 January 2019	17 January 2020	357 days	Hellenic Air Force	–
30	Konstantinos Floros	General; Konstantinos Floros (born 1961)	17 January 2020	12 January 2024	3 years, 360 days	Hellenic Army	–
31	Dimitrios Choupis	General; Dimitrios Choupis (born 1965)	12 January 2024	Incumbent	2 years, 243 days	Hellenic Army	
