= Hellenic Armed Forces =

Military forces of Greece

- Eλληνικές Ένοπλες Δυνάμεις
- Coat of arms of the Hellenic Armed Forces
- Founded: 1828
- Current form: 1975
- Service branches: Hellenic Army; Hellenic Navy; Hellenic Air Force
- Headquarters: Athens, Greece

Leadership
- President: Konstantinos Tasoulas
- Prime Minister: Kyriakos Mitsotakis
- Minister of National Defense: Nikos Dendias
- Chief of the General Staff: General Dimitrios Houpis

Personnel
- Military age: 18
- Conscription: Yes
- Active personnel: 142,700
- Reserve personnel: 221,350

Expenditure
- Budget: € 6.13 billion (2025)
- Percent of GDP: 3.08% (2024)

Related articles
- History: Military history of Greece
- Ranks: Greek military ranks

The Hellenic Armed Forces (Greek: Eλληνικές Ένοπλες Δυνάμεις, romanized: Ellinikés Énoples Dynámeis) are the military forces of Greece. The Hellenic Armed Forces consists of the Hellenic Army, the Hellenic Navy, Hellenic Air Force and, in wartime, the Hellenic Coast Guard.

The civilian authority overseeing the Hellenic Armed Forces is the Ministry of National Defense.

== History ==
The Greek military, encompassing the army and navy, was established during the war of independence from Ottoman rule in 1821. The Hellenic Air Force was later introduced in September 1912 as the third arm of the military. Throughout the Balkan Wars of 1912/1913, the Greek armed forces achieved significant victories against the Ottoman and Bulgarian armies, effectively expanding Greece's territorial boundaries. The Kingdom of Greece aligned with the Entente powers during World War I and participated in the intervention in the Russian Civil War in 1919.

However, the conflict between Greece and Turkey, reignited in the early 1920s, concluded in the autumn of 1922 with a severe setback for Greece, known as the "Asia Minor Catastrophe." In World War II, under the leadership of dictator Ioannis Metaxas, Greece rebuffed an ultimatum for surrender from Italy on October 28, 1940. Greek forces managed to repel the Italian invasion, driving them back across the Albanian border. Nonetheless, the combined forces of the German Wehrmacht and Bulgarian military in April and May 1941 (during the Balkan campaign) overpowered Greek resistance. Subsequent to this defeat, segments of the Greek army evacuated to Egypt, where they joined the British Expeditionary Force in continuing the struggle against Axis forces. Following the German withdrawal in 1944, Greece was embroiled in a civil war from March 1946 until October 1949.

Greek soldiers also participated in the Korean War from 1951 to 1955. Since February 18, 1952, Greece has been a fully-fledged member of NATO.

=== Conscription ===
Greece currently has universal compulsory military service for males from and over 18 years of age. Under Greek law, all men over 18 years of age must serve in the Armed Forces for a period of 9-12 months. Women can serve in the Greek military on a voluntary basis, but cannot be conscripted.

=== Budget ===
According to NATO sources in 2008, Greece spent 2.8% of GDP on its military, which translated to about €6.9 billion (US$9.3 billion). In 2008, Greece was the largest importer of conventional weapons in Europe and its military spending was the highest in the European Union relative to the country's GDP, reaching twice the European average.

Data for the 2023 fiscal year showed an estimated expense of €5.5 billion in constant 2015 prices, or €6.2 billion in current prices, equivalent to 2.80% of GDP (-1.08 change since 2022). For the 2024 fiscal year, the expenditure was estimated at €6.1 billion in constant 2015 prices or €7.1 billion in current prices, equivalent to 3.08% of GDP (+0.28% change since 2023).

=== Military personnel ===
Military personnel was estimated at 111,000 for year 2023 and 110,800 for year 2024.

=== International operations ===
Greece is an EU and NATO member and currently participates primarily in peacekeeping operations. Such operations are ISAF in Afghanistan, EUFOR in Bosnia and Herzegovina and Chad, and KFOR in Kosovo. Greece also maintains a small force in Cyprus.

== Component forces and their organization ==
=== Hellenic National Defense General Staff ===
The Hellenic National Defense General Staff has the operational command of the Joint Armed Forces Headquarters and the units that operate under them. It is also responsible for organising and implementing routine operations and exercises of the Joint Armed Forces, coordinating and implementing operations during the management of wartime and peacetime crises and overseeing operations of the Hellenic Armed Forces outside Greek national territory.

=== Hellenic Army ===
The basic components of the Hellenic Army are Arms and Corps. The former is responsible for combat missions and the latter for logistical support. It is organized in Commands, Formations, and Units with the main being brigade, division and corps. Its main mission is to guarantee the territorial integrity and independence of the country.

=== Hellenic Navy ===
The Hellenic Navy incorporates a modern fleet consisting of strike units, such as frigates, gunboats, submarines and fast attack guided missile vessels and multiple types of support vessels, in order to be able to conduct naval operations that protect Greek national interests and guarantee the integrity of Greek territorial waters, the mainland and the islands.

=== Hellenic Air Force ===
The Hellenic Air Force incorporates a modern aircraft fleet and congruent structure, combined with a comprehensive air defense system that consists of a widespread network of anti-aircraft weapons. The structure, which is overseen by the Air Force General Staff, includes the Tactical Air Force Command, the Air Force Support Command, the Air Force Training Command and a number of other independent defense units and services. Its main mission is to defend Greek airspace and to provide combat support to the Hellenic Army and the Hellenic Navy.

== See also ==
- Greek military ranks
- Hellenic Republic / Ministry of National Defense
- List of Greek military bases
- Military history of Greece
- Military history of Greece during World War II
- Athens War Museum
- War Museum of Thessaloniki
