= Nikolaos Douvas =

- Born: 1947 (age 78–79); Agioi Anargyroi, Larissa
- Military career
- Allegiance: Greece
- Branch: Hellenic Army
- Service years: 1970–2006
- Rank: General
- Commands: Chief of the Hellenic Army General Staff; Military attache at Greek consulate in Bonn; Commander of the First Army
- Conflicts: Turkish Invasion of Cyprus
- Awards: Knight Commander (Grand Cross) of the Order of Honour; Knight Commander (Grand Cross) of the Order of the Phoenix

General Nikolaos Douvas (Greek: Νικόλαος Ντούβας, born 1947) served as Chief of the Hellenic Army General Staff. General Douvas was honourably discharged from the Hellenic Army on March 1, 2006. After his discharge from the army he has been appointed as president at EKO (the biggest Greek state owned oil company).

== Early life and education ==
Douvas was born in Agioi Anargyroi and grew up in Larissa, then attended the Hellenic Military Academy, from which he graduated in 1970, with a commission as a second lieutenant of infantry. Douvas has augmented his early military education serving at several military and civilian colleges and training centers in Greece and the United States, including the Hellenic Advanced School for Warfare, the Hellenic National Defense College, and the Center for Public Jurisprudence and Political Science at the University of Athens School of Law.

Military offices
Preceded by Lt General Panagiotis Charvalas	Chief of the Hellenic Army General Staff; 2004–2006	Succeeded by Lt General Dimitrios Grapsas
