= Stamatis Vellidis =

Greek general (1928–2021)

Stamatis Vellidis (Greek: Σταμάτης Βελλίδης; Kornofolia, Soufli, Evros, 1928 – 2 November 2021) was a general of the Hellenic Army who acted as chief of the Hellenic Army General Staff (1986–1989) and chief of the Hellenic National Defence General Staff (1989–1990). After his retirement, he became president of the Administrative Council of the Hellenic Arms Industry. He was a close friend and associate of the Minister for National Defence Ioannis Charalambopoulos.

== Biography ==
He was born in 1928 in the village of Kornofolia of the Evros prefecture, near Soufli. He studied in the Hellenic Military Academy, graduating on 12 August 1952 as a second lieutenant of Engineers. As an officer he also studied in the Engineers School, the Superior War School and the National Defence School, as well as in the Technical Engineers Officer School and the National Technical University of Athens (Faculty of Civil Engineers).

He served as commander and staff officer in various units and formations, notably as commander of the Engineers for the 9th Infantry Division and the IV Army Corps, commanding officer of the 11th Infantry Division and of the III Army Corps, and head of the Engineers Directorate and IV Branch of the Hellenic Army General Staff. Promoted to lieutenant general in 1984, he served as Inspector-General of the Army, and from 23 December 1986, as Chief of the HAGS. During his term as chief of the HAGS, he mobilised the army during the 1987 Aegean Crisis with Turkey. On 2 January 1989 he was named Chief of the Hellenic National Defence General Staff and promoted to full general. He held the post until his retirement in May 1990.

In 1993 he was a candidate for parliament with PASOK, but was not elected. He then acted as president of the board of directors of the Hellenic Arms Industry from 1993 to 1997.

Vellidis died on 2 November 2021, at the age of 93.

== Dates of rank ==
- Second lieutenant: 1952
- Lieutenant: 1954
- Captain: 1960
- Major: 1967
- Lieutenant colonel: 1973
- Colonel: 1979
- Brigadier: 1981
- Major general: 1983
- Lieutenant general: 1984
- General: 1989
