= Nicholas Stergiou =

Greek-American Biomechanic

- Born: October 16, 1965 (age 60)
- Spouse: Ann E. Kessinger (m. 1997)

Academic background
- Education: BSc, physical education, 1989, Aristotle University of Thessaloniki; MSc, 1991, University of Nebraska Omaha; PhD, 1995, University of Oregon
- Thesis: Mechanisms Associated with Running Injuries

Nicholas Stergiou (Greek: Νικόλαος Στεργίου; born October 16, 1965) is a Greek-American biomechanic. He is the founding Chair of the Department of Biomechanics at University of Nebraska at Omaha (UNO), where he is also the Distinguished Community Research Chair and Professor. He is also the Director of the Center for Research in Human Movement Variability and Dean of the Division of Biomechanics and Research Development at UNO. Stergiou is also a professor at the College of Public Health at the University of Nebraska Medical Center.

== Early life and education ==
Stergiou was born on October 16, 1965. He completed his Bachelor of Science degree at Aristotle University of Thessaloniki before enrolling at the University of Nebraska Omaha (UNO) for his Master's degree. He chose to apply to UNO after reading a journal article written by UNO professor Kris Berg. After completing his master's degree, Stergiou completed his PhD at the University of Oregon. He was then forced to return to Greece to complete his mandatory military service.

== Career ==
While completing his mandatory military service, Stergiou secured an academic position at UNO in 1996. Upon joining the faculty as an assistant professor, Stergiou became the Director of the HPER Biomechanics Laboratory.

== Personal life ==
Stergiou married Ann E. Kessinger in 1997.
