= Elafotopos =

Elafotopos Ελαφότοπος
- Community
- Location within Greece
- Coordinates: 39°54′4″N 20°41′21″E
- Country: Greece
- Administrative region: Epirus
- Regional unit: Ioannina
- Municipality: Zagori
- Municipal unit: Central Zagori
- Elevation: 1,342 m (4,403 ft)

Population (2021)
  - Community: 114
- Time zone: UTC+2 (EET)
  - Summer (DST): UTC+3 (EEST)

Elafotopos (Greek: Ελαφότοπος, before 1928: Τσερβάρι, Tservari) is a settlement in Ioannina regional unit, Epirus, Greece.

== Name ==
The village was recorded as Tservari in a chrysobull from 1361 by Serbian ruler Simeon Uroš to the feudal lord John Tzafa Orsini Douka. The toponym is derived from the Aromanian țerbu 'deer', from Latin cervus, and the Aromanian (and Romanian) suffix -ărie often associated with subjects of words denoting animals.

== Demographics ==
The village is inhabited by Greeks, and some Sarakatsani who settled in the village during the early 20th century. The Sarakatsani are Greek speakers. Some Sarakatsani from Elafotopos later settled in Kalpaki on the Doliana plain during the 1970s and 1980s.

== See also ==
- List of settlements in the Ioannina regional unit
