= Mixed Groups of Reconstruction Machines =

Mixed Groups of Reconstruction Machines (Greek: Μικτές Ομάδες Μηχανημάτων Ανασυγκροτήσεως), commonly known by the acronym MOMA, was a Greek military construction organization which was active from 1957 to 1992.

It was established in 1957, with sections based in Athens, Thessaloniki, Heraklion, Patras, Lamia, Larissa, and Ioannina, and comprised both permanent and conscript personnel from the Engineers arm of the Hellenic Army, as well as contracted civilian engineers, drivers, workers, and other personnel. Its main purpose was the construction of infrastructure (bridges, airports, roads etc) in the country following the extensive devastation of World War II, the Axis occupation of Greece, and the Greek Civil War. It was abolished in 1992, but in 2015, a similar service, under the name "MOMKA" (Μονάδα Μελετών και Κατασκευών) was established.
