= Dimitrios Choupis =

Dimitrios Choupis (Greek: Δημήτριος Χούπης; born 1965 in Nea Kerdylia, Serres) is a Greek army general. He has been chief of the Hellenic National Defence General Staff since 12 January 2024.

== Life and career ==
He was born in 1965 in Nea Kerdylia. He was admitted to the Hellenic Military Academy in 1983, from which he graduated in 1987 with the rank of second lieutenant of communications. As a fourth-year cadet (1986–1987), he served as sergeant major of the Hellenic Military Academy.

== Personal life ==
He is married with 3 kids, all of whom are in the armed forces. He is fluent in English and French. He is an active freefall parachutist. He holds a doctorate from the National Technical University of Athens. On June 16, 2024, he was declared an honorary citizen of Visaltia by decision of the Mayor Vana Pliakou.
