= Ministry of National Defence (Greece) =

Government ministry of Greece

- Υπουργείο Εθνικής Άμυνας; Ypourgeío Ethnikís Ámynas

Agency overview
- Formed: April 14, 1950
- Preceding agencies: Vice minister of military affairs; Vice minister of naval affairs; Vice minister of aviation
- Jurisdiction: Government of Greece
- Headquarters: Mesogeion Avenue, Athens
- Motto: Αμύνεσθαι περί Πάτρης ("To fight for the fatherland")
- Employees: 85.748 (2024); 86.639 (2015)
- Annual budget: 6.025.300.000 € (2025)
- Minister responsible: Nikos Dendias
- Deputy Minister responsible: Thanasis Davakis
- Child agencies: Hellenic National Defence General Staff; Hellenic Army General Staff; Hellenic Navy General Staff; Hellenic Air Force General Staff
- Website: www.mod.mil.gr/en/

The Ministry of National Defence (Greek: Υπουργείο Εθνικής Άμυνας, romanized: Ypourgeío Ethnikís Ámynas, abbreviated ΥΠΕΘΑ, YPETHA), is the civilian cabinet organisation responsible for managing the Hellenic Armed Forces, the leader of which is, according to the Constitution (Article 45), the President of the Republic but their administration is exercised only by the Prime Minister and the Government of Greece. It is located at 227-231 Messogion Avenue, in the Papagos camp (Pentagon) in Athens, between Papagos and Holargos.

Today is hierarchically ranked 3rd in the rankings of ministries, according to a decision of the Prime Minister (Government Gazette B / 1594 / 25–6–2013). The highest position in the history of the Ministry was the second, behind the ministry of the presidency of the government, on the last government of Andreas Papandreou (1993–1996).

Since 27 June 2023, the Minister for National Defence is Nikos Dendias.

== History ==
It was founded in 1950 from the unification of three Ministries: under the influence of American advisors. However, a single Ministry of National Defence was established and operated in the three-year period of 1941–44 by the puppet governments (the legitimate exiled Greek government of the Middle East had retained the separate Ministries of Military Affairs, Naval Affairs and Aviation for the free Greek Armed Forces there).

== Organisation ==
=== Civilian leadership ===
- Minister of Defence Υπουργός Εθνικής Άμυνας (Υ.ΕΘ.Α)
- Alternate Minister of Defence Αναπληρωτής Υπουργός Εθνικής Άμυνας (ΑΝ.Υ.ΕΘ.Α)
- Assistant Minister of Defence Υφυπουργός ή Υφυπουργοί Εθνικής Άμυνας (ΥΦ.ΕΘ.Α)

=== Advisory bodies ===
- Defence Council Συμβούλιο Άμυνας (ΣΑΜ)
- Council of the Chiefs of the General Staff Συμβούλιο Αρχηγών Γενικών Επιτελείων (ΣΑΓΕ)
- Chief of the National Defence General Staff Αρχηγός Γενικού Επιτελείου Εθνικής Άμυνας (Α/ΓΕΕΘΑ)
- Supreme Councils of the Branches of the Armed Forces Ανώτατα Συμβούλια των Κλάδων των Εvόπλων Δυνάμεων (ΑΣΣ–ΑΝΣ–ΑΑΣ)
- Chiefs of the General Staff of the three Branches of the Armed Forces Αρχηγοί των Γενικών Επιτελείων των τριών Κλάδων (Α/ΓΕΣ–Α/ΓΕΝ–Α/ΓΕΑ)

=== Directorates of the MoND ===
The ministry is structured into three General Directorates:

- General Directorate for Financial Planning and Support Γενική Διεύθυνση Οικονομικού Σχεδιασμού και Υποστήριξης (ΓΔΟΣΥ)
- General Directorate for Defence Equipment and Investments Γενική Διεύθυνση Αμυντικών Εξοπλισμών και Επενδύσεων (ΓΔΑΕΕ)
- General Directorate for National Defence Policy and International Relations Γενική Διεύθυνση Πολιτικής Εθνικής Άμυνας και Διεθνών Σχέσεων (ΓΔΠΕΑΔΣ)

There are also the Departments of:

- Department of Briefing Διεύθυνση Ενημέρωσης
- Relief Fund for Disabled and War Victims Ταμείο Αρωγής Αναπήρων και Θυμάτων Πολέμου
- Single Administrative Sector Ενιαίος Διοικητικός Τομέας

== Responsibilities ==
Also, the ministry oversees the four General Staff of the Armed Forces:

- National Defence General Staff
  - General Staff of the Army
  - General Staff of the Navy
  - General Staff of the Air Force
