= Government Council for Foreign Affairs and Defence =

Greek government body

The Government Council for National Security (Greek: Κυβερνητικό Συμβούλιο Εθνικής Ασφαλείας, romanized: Kyvernītikó Symvoúlio Ethnikī́s Asfaleías), usually known by its acronym KYSEA (ΚΥΣΕΑ), is the supreme decision-making body on issues of foreign policy and national defence of Greece. It was established in 1986 by initiative of Prime Minister Andreas Papandreou. Since its creation, its composition has changed many times. The president of the council is the prime minister.

== Composition ==
After the latest overhaul of its membership in July 2012, it comprises:

- the Prime Minister of Greece as chairman
- the Minister for Foreign Affairs
- the Minister for National Defence
- the Minister for Citizen Protection
- the Minister of Migration and Asylum
- the Minister of Maritime Affairs and Insular Policy
- the Minister of Climate Crisis and Civil Protection
- the Chief of the Hellenic National Defence General Staff

The National Security Advisor to the Prime Minister of Greece performs the functions of secretary of the KYSEA.
