= Orders, decorations, and medals of Greece =

Orders of chivalry and other honours of the Hellenic Republic

The Greek honors system goes back to 1829 and the establishment of the Order of the Redeemer at the Fourth National Assembly at Argos. However, the relevant decree was signed in Nafplio by King Otto on May 20, 1833. The Grand Cross of the Order of the Redeemer remains the highest honor of Greece to this day.

== Hellenic Republic ==
=== Orders ===
- Order of the Redeemer
- Order of Honour
- Order of the Phoenix
- Order of Beneficence (restricted to females)

== Kingdom of Greece ==
- Royal Order of the Redeemer
- Royal Family Order of Saints George and Constantine (dynastic)
- Royal Family Order of Saints Olga and Sophia (dynastic, restricted to females from royal family)
- Royal Order of George I (dynastic post 1973)
- Royal Order of the Phoenix
- Royal Order of Beneficence (restricted to females)
- Centennial Medal

== Ranks ==
As with most European orders, the Greek orders have the following ranks, in order of precedence:

1. Grand Cross
2. Grand Officer
3. Commander
4. Knight of the Gold Cross
5. Knight of the Silver Cross

== Transmission of honors ==
In the past, the insignia of the order were to be returned to the State. However, in recent years, the rule has changed and the heirs of the honoree may keep the insignia.

== Grand Master ==
The Grand Master of the Greek orders is the head of state of the country. Since 1975, Greece is a republic and the head of state is the President of Greece who is also responsible for awarding them, according to article 46, paragraph 2 of the Constitution of Greece and law 106/1975, upon the recommendation of the Minister for Foreign Affairs.

== Selection criteria ==
According to Law 106/1975, all proposals made by the Minister for Foreign Affairs are reviewed by the Council on Honors (Greek: Συμβούλιο Ταγμάτων Αριστείας) when it applies to Greek citizens, the Greek diaspora, military officers, and government workers. Individuals are selected to reward their contributions to Greece, be it the state, its culture, sports, arts, language, etc.

The Council on Honors, which comes together by decision of the Minister for Foreign Affairs, serves for a two-year term:

- the President of the Council of State
- the President of the Court of Cassation
- two Greek citizens who have been awarded the Grand Cross
- one of the senior-most diplomats of the Ministry of Foreign Affairs, either an ambassador or minister plenipotentiary.
- a senior military officer, set by the Defence General Staff
- a representative from the office of the President of Greece

== Medals ==
=== Gallantry and merit medals ===
==== Military medals (since 1974) ====
- Medal for Gallantry
- Cross of Valour
- War Cross
- Medal for Outstanding Acts
- Medal for Exceptional Acts
- Medal of Military Merit
- Long Service and Good Conduct Medal

===== Military commendations =====
- Commendation for Leadership of the General Staff (Hellenic National Defence General Staff, Hellenic Army General Staff, Hellenic Air Force General Staff, Hellenic Navy General Staff)
- Star for Merit and Honour
- Medal for Merit and Honour
- Commemoration for Leadership of a formation or extant unit
- Commendation for Meritorious Command
- Commendation for Long Service in Corps and Joint Corps (e.g. Judicial Corps)
- Commendation for Service as a Staff Officer
- Commendation for Service in a General Staff
- Commendation for Participation in Peacekeeping Operations
- Medal for Higher Military Educational Institutions Graduates (since 2025).

==== Police medals (since 1985) ====
- Police Medal for Gallantry
- Police Cross
- Medal of Police Merit
- Long Service and Good Conduct Police Medal

===== Police commendations =====
- Commendation for Leadership of the Hellenic Police
- Star for Merit and Honour
- Commendation for Meritorious Command
- Commendation for Meritorious Staff Service
- Commendation for Meritorious Staff Service as a Special Duty Officer

==== Fire Service medals (since 1998) ====
- Fire Service Medal for Gallantry
- Fire Service Cross
- Medal of Fire Service Merit

==== Coast Guard commendations ====
- Commendation for Leadership of the Coast Guard
- Star for Merit and Honour
- Medal for Merit and Honour
- Commemoration for Leadership of a Regional Coast Guard Command
- Commendation for Meritorious Command
- Commendation for Service as a Staff Officer
- Commendation for Meritorious Staff Service
- Commendation for Long Service

==== Medals no longer awarded ====
===== Hellenic Gendarmerie (1946–1985) =====
- Medal of Valour
- Medal for Gallantry
- Medal for Self-Sacrifice
- War Cross
- Medal for Outstanding Acts
- Medal of Military Merit
- Medal of Merit
- Medal for Long and Meritorious Service

==== Cities Police (1946–1985) ====
Sources:

- Police Medal
- Medal for Police Merit
- Police Cross

=== Commemorative and campaign medals ===
- Cross for the War of Independence 1821–29
- Cross for the Bavarian Auxiliary Corps
- Medal for the Proclamation of the Constitution of 1843
- Medal for the Greco-Turkish War of 1912–1913
- Medal for the Greco-Bulgarian War
- Medal for the Macedonian Struggle (1904–08)
- Inter-Allied Victory Medal (1916–18)
- Royal Hellenic Navy Campaign Cross (1940–45)
- Maritime War Cross
- Medal for the Air Defense of Alexandria
- Medal for the War of 1940–1941
- Medal for the War of 1941–1945
- Medal for the National Resistance (1941–45)
- United Nations Korea Medal (1950–53)
- Centenary Memorial Medal of the Greek Royal Family
- Flying Cross
- Air Force Merit Cross
- Medal for Operations in Cyprus (1964, 1967, 1974)

== Honorees ==
Those that have been honored by one of the Greek State Orders are given the right to wear their insignia for life, provided they have not been stricken from the rolls of their respective order, as per the penal code or by decision of the Council on Honors. The latter group may take such a decision if it deems that the person retaining the honor causes public discomfort or negatively affects the prestige of the Order. After the death of the honoree, the insignia may be kept by his or her heirs.

Greek orders timeline
Orders by precedence	1832–1909	1910s	1920s		1930s	1940s	1950s	1960s	1970–present	
Order of the Redeemer	.								Rep.	
Order of Honour										Rep.
Order of Saints George and Constantine					.		.		.	Dynastic
Order of Saints Olga and Sophia					.		.		.	Dynastic
Order of George I		.			.		.		.	Dynastic
Order of the Phoenix					.					Rep.
Order of Beneficence							.			Rep.
Years										
Regime	Monarchy			Republic	Mon.	Rep.	Monarchy		Rep.	
	1832–1909	1910s	1920s		1930s	1940s	1950s	1960s	1970–present	
