= Order of Beneficence =

Order of chivalry in Greece

Order of Beneficence Τάγμα της Ευποιΐας
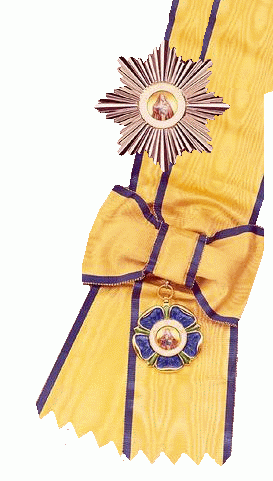
- Grand Cross and Star of the Order of Beneficence

Awarded by the President of the Hellenic Republic
- Type: Order
- Motto: ΕΥΠΟΙΪΑ
- Eligibility: Only for women
- Awarded for: Distinguished services to Greece and in the public sphere
- Status: Currently constituted
- Grades: Grand Cross, Grand Commander, Commander, Gold Cross, Silver Cross

Precedence
- Next (higher): Order of the Phoenix
- Next (lower): -
- Ribbon bar of the Order of Beneficence

The Order of Beneficence (Greek: Τάγμα της Ευποιΐας, romanized: Tágma tis Eipoiías) is an order of Greece which was established in 1975 by law no.106/1975, using the same name and same insignia as that of the order instituted in the previous governance of the Kingdom of Greece, although a separate order with different statutes. It is conferred by the President of the Republic as a moral reward for women especially, Greek or foreigner who have contributed good services to the country. The fact that the order is awarded to women does not mean that the other Greek decorations are awarded exclusively to men.

The order has three symbols: a "badge", a "star", and a "ribbon". The badge is a five-petaled flower, enameled in blue. The star is a silver eight-pointed star with straight rays. The ribbon is an orange ribbon with blue edges.

== Grades ==
The Order has five classes:

- Grand Cross – wears the badge on a sash from the right shoulder, plus the star on the left chest;
- Grand Commander – wears the badge on a bow, plus the star on the right chest;
- Commander – wears the badge on a bow;
- Gold Cross – wears the badge on a ribbon on the left chest;
- Silver Cross – wears the badge on a ribbon on the left chest.

Ribbon bars
Grand Cross	Grand Officer	Commander	Officer	Member

== Recipients ==
=== Grand Cross ===
- Denmark: Queen Mary
- Denmark: Princess Marie
- Luxembourg: Grand Duchess Maria Teresa

== Insignia ==
The badge of the Order is a five tipped blue-enamelled flower, in silver (or silvered) for the Silver Cross class, in gold (or goldened) for the higher classes. The overall design is clearly derived from the then-recently abolished British Order of the Indian Empire.

There are four versions of the badge :

- The first was awarded from 1948 to 1973. It is surmounted by a royal crown and features a reverse medallion with the cypher of King George II.
- The second and third versions were awarded from 1975 to 1984. These versions do not have a surmounting crown and feature reverse medallions without an inscription, or with the initials “ED” (the first letters to “Greek Republic”).
- The fourth version has neither a crown but features a reverse medallion with the national coat of arms and “Greek Republic” in full.

All four versions feature an obverse central disc bearing a portrait of the Theotokos with the Divine Child in Her arms with the legend "ΕΥΠΟΙΙΑ" («Beneficence») on a white enamel ring.

The star of the Order is a silver eight-pointed star with straight rays, with the same central disc as the obverse of the badge.

There may be other slight differences of the badge or the star depending on the manufacturer.

The ribbon of the Order is orange with blue edges.

== Royal Order ==
The Royal Order of Beneficence (Greek: Τάγμα της Ευποιΐας) is an order of knighthood of the Greek Royal Family that was established in 1948 by King Pavlos I, following the death of King George II of Greece, in accordance with his wishes.

It is conferred by the Head of the Royal House of Greece as a dynastic Decoration for women especially, Greek and foreign, for the good services they have rendered to the Fatherland in the field of charity as well as for their performance in the arts and letters.

After the abolition of the Kingdom of Greece and its replacement by the Third Hellenic Republic, all orders and decorations of knighthood were disbanded as state orders (although retained as dynastic house orders by the Greek Royal Family) and replaced by republican versions of the orders of knighthood, including this order which is currently awarded by the two entities but as separate orders with their own statutes.

=== Grades of the Royal Order ===
The Order has five grades:

- Dame Grand Cross – wears the badge on a sash from the right shoulder, plus the star on the left chest;
- Dame Grand Officer – wears the badge on a bow, plus the star on the right chest;
- Dame Commander – wears the badge on an elongated ribbon bow (day and evening dress) and wears a necklet (uniform)
- Dame Officer – wears the badge suspended on a ribbon bow on the left chest;
- Dame – wears a smaller badge suspended on a ribbon bow on the left chest.

Ribbon bars
Dame Grand Cross	Dame Grand Officer	Dame Commander	Dame Officer	Dame

=== Recipients ===
==== Dames Grand Cross ====
- (Tsardom of Bulgaria (1908–1946)) : Queen Margarita
- (Kingdom of Egypt) : Princess Farida Zulficar
- Jordan: Princess Muna Gardiner
- Liechtenstein: Princess Georgina
- Monaco: Princess Grace
- Thailand: Queen Sirikit, Queen Mother

==== Dame Grand Officer ====
- Yugoslavia: Lepa Perović

== See also ==
- Orders, decorations, and medals of Greece
- Orders of chivalry for women
- List of awards honoring women

Greek orders timeline
Orders by precedence	1832–1909	1910s	1920s		1930s	1940s	1950s	1960s	1970–present	
Order of the Redeemer	.								Rep.	
Order of Honour										Rep.
Order of Saints George and Constantine					.		.		.	Dynastic
Order of Saints Olga and Sophia					.		.		.	Dynastic
Order of George I		.			.		.		.	Dynastic
Order of the Phoenix					.					Rep.
Order of Beneficence							.			Rep.
Years										
Regime	Monarchy			Republic	Mon.	Rep.	Monarchy		Rep.	
	1832–1909	1910s	1920s		1930s	1940s	1950s	1960s	1970–present	
