= Angelos Chaniotis =

Greek historian and classical scholar

- Born: 8 November 1959 (age 66); Athens
- Known for: Contributions to ancient Mediterranean history
- Awards: Order of the Phoenix (2014)

Academic background
- Education: Heidelberg University

Academic work
- Discipline: Historian, Classical philology
- Institutions: Institute for Advanced Study

Angelos Chaniotis (Greek: Άγγελος Χανιώτης; born November 8, 1959) is a Greek historian and Classics scholar, known for original and wide-ranging research in the cultural, religious, legal and economic history of the Hellenistic period and the Byzantine Empire. His research interests also include the history of Crete and Greek epigraphy. Chaniotis is a Professor in the School of Historical Studies at the Institute for Advanced Study in Princeton.

He is a member of the German Archaeological Institute and was a member of the Editorial Board of the Classical Studies journal Mnemosyne.

== Education and career ==
Chaniotis got his B.A. at the University of Athens in 1982. He got his Ph.D. at Heidelberg University in 1984 and received habilitation at that same institution in 1992. He was a visiting professor at New York University in 1993–1998. He was a visiting professor at Oxford University from 2010 to 2013 and senior research fellow at All Souls College, Oxford, from 2006 to 2010. He taught at Heidelberg University from 1987 to 2006 and was the chair of that school's Department of Ancient History from 1998 to 2006. In 2008 he joined the faculty as an ancient history and classics professor in the School of Historical Studies at the Institute for Advanced Study.

Chaniotis is the co-director of the Lyktos Archaeological Project.

== Awards ==
In 2000 the German state of Baden-Württemberg awarded Chaniotis one of its State Research Prizes. In 2015 the Alexander von Humboldt Foundation awarded him one of eleven Anneliese Maier Research Awards. In 2014 the government of Greece awarded him the Commander's Cross of the Order of the Phoenix.

== Works ==
- Age of Conquests: The Greek World from Alexander to Hadrian, London: Profile Books and Cambridge MA: Harvard University Press, 2018, ISBN 9780674659643
- War in the Hellenistic World : a Social and Cultural History, Malden, MA : Oxford (Eng.) 2005, ISBN 0631226087
- Die Verträge zwischen kretischen Poleis in der hellenistischen Zeit, Stuttgart : Steiner, 1996 (habilitation thesis) ISBN 3515068279
- Das antike Kreta, München : Beck, 2004, ISBN 3406508502 (In German)
- Historie und Historiker in den griechischen Inschriften : epigraphische Beiträge zur griechischen Historiographie, Steiner, Stuttgart, 1988, (doctoral dissertation) ISBN 3515049460 (In German)
- Heidelberger Althistorische posts and Epigraphic Studies. Vol. 24, Steiner, Stuttgart 1996, ISBN 3515068279

Books edited

- Unveiling emotions. Vol. I: Sources and Methods for the Study of Emotions in the Greek world, Stuttgart : F. Steiner, 2012, ISBN 9783515102261
- Unveiling emotions. Vol. II: Sources and Methods for the Study of Emotions in Greece and Rome: Texts, Images, Material Culture, Stuttgart : F. Steiner, 2012, ISBN 9783515106375
- Unveiling emotions. Vol. III: Arousal, Display, and Performance of Emotions in the Greek World, Stuttgart : F. Steiner, 2021, ISBN 9783515129503
- From Minoan farmers to Roman traders: sidelights on the economy of ancient Crete, Stuttgart : F. Steiner, 1999, ISBN 3515076212
