= Order of Honour (Greece) =

Greek decoration

Order of Honour Τάγμα της Τιμής
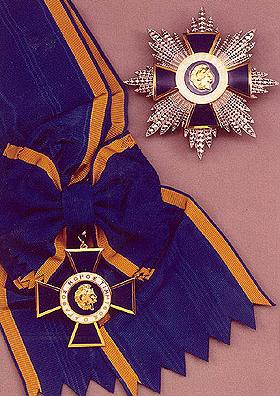
- Grand Cross and Star of the Order of Honour, final version

Awarded by the President of the Hellenic Republic
- Type: Order
- Established: 18 August 1975
- Country: Greece
- Motto: Ο Αγαθός μόνος τιμητέος Only the virtuous to be honoured
- Awarded for: distinguished services to Greece and in the public sphere
- Status: Currently constituted
- Grades: Grand Cross; Grand Commander; Commander; Gold Cross; Silver Cross

Precedence
- Next (higher): Order of the Redeemer
- Next (lower): Order of the Phoenix
- Ribbon bar of the order

The Order of Honour (Greek: Τάγμα της Τιμής, romanized: Tágma tis Timís) is an order of Greece. It comes second in rank to the Order of the Redeemer and was established in 1975, replacing the abolished Royal Order of George I.

It is conferred by the Greek government upon "Greek citizens who are distinguished in struggles for the Fatherland, to senior executives of the public administration, to eminent personalities of the arts and letters as well as to distinguished scientists or individuals who excelled in the field of trade, shipping and industry. It is also conferred upon foreigners who, due to their distinguished position and through their personal worth, have contributed to the promotion of Greece."

== Grades ==
As all Greek orders, the Order of Honour has five classes:

- Grand Cross (Μεγαλόσταυρος): wears the badge on a sash on the right shoulder, plus the star on the left chest
- Grand Commander (Ανώτερος Ταξιάρχης): wears the badge on a necklet, plus the star on the right chest
- Commander (Ταξιάρχης): wears the badge on a necklet
- Gold Cross (Χρυσός Σταυρός): wears the badge on a ribbon on the left chest
- Silver Cross (Αργυρός Σταυρός): wears the badge on a ribbon on the left chest

Ribbon bars
| Grand Cross | Grand Commander | Commander | Gold Cross | Silver Cross |

== Insignia ==
The badge of the order is a blue-enamelled cross, in silver for the Silver Cross class, in gold for the higher classes. The obverse central disc bears a portrait of the goddess Athena and the legend Ο ΑΓΑΘΟΣ ΜΟΝΟΣ ΤΙΜΗΤΕΟΣ ("Only the righteous should be honoured") on a white enamel band. The reverse bears a simplified national emblem of Greece in the form of a white Greek cross on blue, and on a circular band the legend ΕΛΛΗΝΙΚΗ ΔΗΜΟΚΡΑΤΙΑ ("Hellenic Republic") and the year of the order's founding (1975). The Silver and Gold Crosses have a diameter of 37 mm, while the senior grades have a diameter of 57 mm. The law also provides for the award of the Order with Swords (featuring a pair of crossed swords behind the cross), in recognition of wartime deeds. As of 2008 however, no such awards have been made.

The star of the order is a silver eight-pointed star with straight rays, with the entire badge in the centre. The reverse bears the Greek national emblem in white enamel and the legend ΕΛΛΗΝΙΚΗ ΔΗΜΟΚΡΑΤΙΑ 1975 in gold letters. The star of the Grand Commander is 80 mm wide, and that of the Grand Cross 90 mm.

The ribbon of the Order is blue with orange edges. The first four grades have a ribbon of 35 mm, with 3 mm-wide edges, while the shash of the Grand Cross is 100 mm wide, with edges 8 mm wide.

== History ==
When the ruling Greek military regime abolished the monarchy in June 1973, the two orders most associated with the monarchy, namely the Order of George I and the Order of Beneficence, were also abolished (Law 179 of 25 September 1973). The Order of George I was to be replaced by a newly constituted "Order of Merit" (Τάγμα της Αξίας), but it had not been realised until the regime's fall a year later.

Following the restoration of democratic rule, Law 106 of 7 August 1975 "On the Orders of Excellence" regulated the new order structure of the Hellenic Republic, and reconfirmed the establishment of the Order of Honour, to be ranked second hierarchically after the Order of the Redeemer. A competition followed for the design of the new decoration, won by Konstantinos Kontopanos. His design was finalised in the Presidential Decree 849 of 11 November 1975. The original design was differed from the current: the head of Athena was of a different design, the motto was absent, and the intertwined letters ΕΔ, the initials of ΕΛΛΗΝΙΚΗ ΔΗΜΟΚΡΑΤΙΑ were placed between the arms of the cross. The reverse featured a circular white band with the words ΕΛΛΗΝΙΚΗ ΔΗΜΟΚΡΑΤΙΑ. In addition, the crosses were suspended from an oval laurel wreath. The overall appearance and quality of the first designs were deemed unsatisfactory, and in late 1976, the French firm Arthus Bertrand was commissioned with making a new design, sans the ΕΔ, and without the enamel, giving the blue cross a more matte appearance. The French design also featured a new form of the star badge, in the form of an eight-pointed star, on which the entire cross badge was placed, while of the original design was four-pointed and featured only the cross's central disc with the head of Athena. This design was officially adopted in May 1977 (Presidential Decree 428), and the French firm provided two batches of orders until 1978.

In 1980, an order was given to a Greek firm for 200 crosses of a simplified design, but the result was again far from satisfactory: this type featured a purplish hue of blue, and the head of Athena was flipped and of bad quality. The situation was finally resolved in October 1984, with Presidential Decree 485, which established the current design as final. Since 1984, the orders awarded by the Greek Foreign Ministry and the Presidency of the Republic have been manufactured by the Swiss firm Huguenin Medailleurs, while orders issued to the personnel of the Greek Armed Forces and security forces have been of local manufacture.

== Notable recipients ==
- Marcin Wilczek (Silver Cross)
- Charles Upham
- Aníbal Cavaco Silva (Grand Cross) (1990)
- Vytautas Landsbergis (Grand Cross)
- Guy Verhofstadt (Grand Cross) (2005)
- Queen Silvia (Grand Cross)
- King Frederik X of Denmark (Grand Cross)
- Crown Princess Victoria of Sweden (Grand Cross)
- Prince Carl Philip (Grand Cross)
- Princess Madeleine (Grand Cross)
- Valentina Matviyenko (Grand Cross) (2007)
- Radosław Sikorski (Grand Commander) (2014)
- António Costa (Grand Cross) (2017)
- Mikis Theodorakis (Grand Cross) (2021)
- Narendra Modi (Grand Cross) (2023)

== Sources ==
- Zotiadis, Orthodoxos (November–December 2005). "Τάγμα Αριστείας της Τιμής" (PDF). Στρατιωτική Επιθεώρηση (in Greek). General Staff of National Defense: 95–103. Archived from the original (PDF) on 2016-03-03.

== General references ==
- Beldecos, George J. (1991). Hellenic Orders, Decorations and Medals. Athens: Hellenic War Museum. ISBN 960-85054-0-2. OCLC 67933012.

Greek orders timeline
| Orders by precedence | 1832–1909 | 1910s | 1920s | | 1930s | 1940s | 1950s | 1960s | 1970–present | |
|---|---|---|---|---|---|---|---|---|---|---|
| Order of the Redeemer | . | | | | | | | | Rep. | |
| Order of Honour | | | | | | | | | | Rep. |
| Order of Saints George and Constantine | | | | | . | | . | | . | Dynastic |
| Order of Saints Olga and Sophia | | | | | . | | . | | . | Dynastic |
| Order of George I | | . | | | . | | . | | . | Dynastic |
| Order of the Phoenix | | | | | . | | | | | Rep. |
| Order of Beneficence | | | | | | | . | | | Rep. |
| Years | | | | | | | | | | |
| Regime | Monarchy | | | Republic | Mon. | Rep. | Monarchy | | Rep. | |
| | 1832–1909 | 1910s | 1920s | | 1930s | 1940s | 1950s | 1960s | 1970–present | |
