= Order of Saints Olga and Sophia =

Order of the Greek royal family

Royal Order of Saints Olga and Sophia Τάγμα Ἁγίων Ὂλγας καὶ Σοφίας
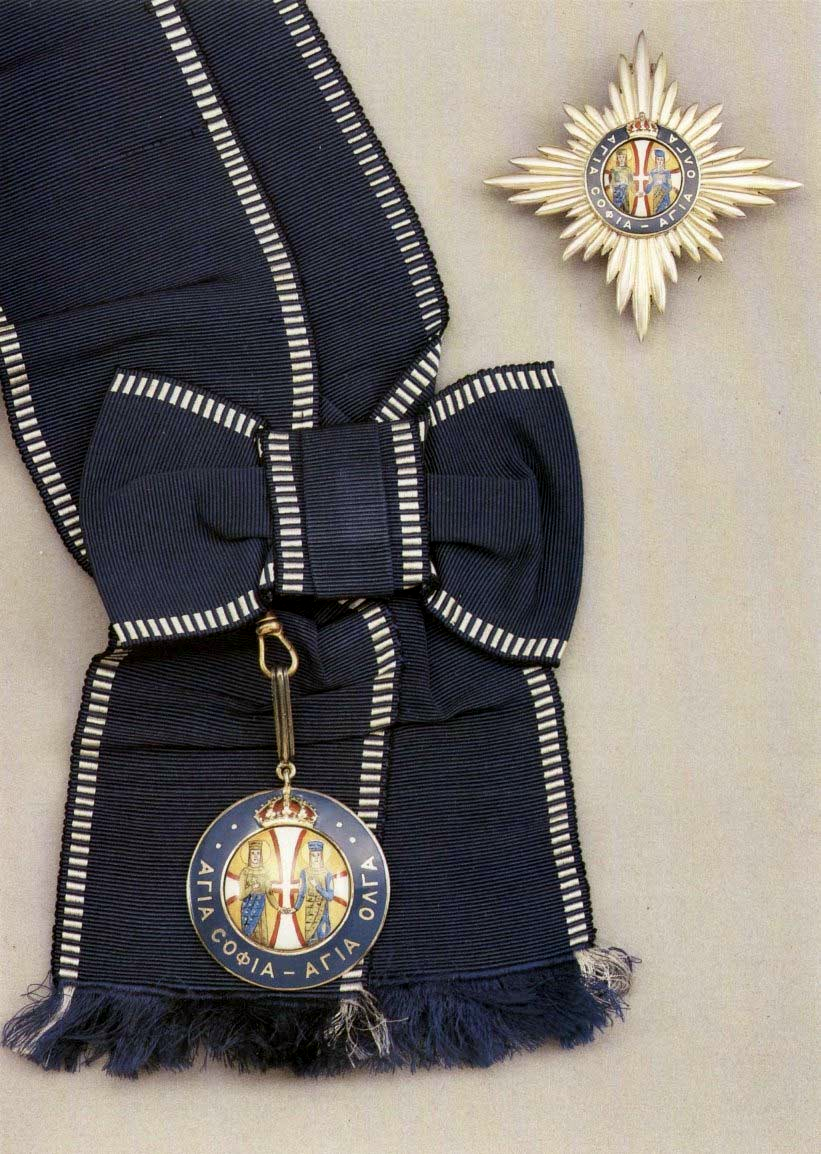
- Grand Cross set of the Order

Awarded by the head of the Greek royal family
- Type: Dynastic Order
- Eligibility: Women (post-1974 typically members of the royal family)
- Awarded for: At the monarch's pleasure for personal services of women to the Crown
- Status: Currently constituted
- Sovereign: Crown Prince Pavlos
- Grand Mistress: Crown Princess Marie-Chantal
- Grades: 1st Class; 2nd Class; 3rd Class; 4th Class

Statistics
- First induction: 1936 Queen Helen, Queen Mother of Romania
- Last induction: 2020 Princess Nina, Princess Philippos of Greece and Denmark

Precedence
- Next (higher): Royal Order of the Redeemer
- Next (lower): Royal Order of George I
- Equivalent: Royal Order of Saints George and Constantine
- Ribbon bar of the Order

The Royal Family Order of Saints Olga and Sophia (Greek: Βασιλικόν Οἰκογενειακόν Τάγμα Ἁγίων Ὂλγας καὶ Σοφίας, romanized: Vasilikon Oikogeneiakon Tagma Agion Olgas kai Sofias) is an order of the Greek royal family. Reserved for women, it was the third highest honour of the modern Greek state and the Crown after the Order of the Redeemer and the male-only Order of Saints George and Constantine. It was instituted in January 1936, by King George II in the memory of his grandmother (Queen Olga) and his mother (Queen Sophia).

The Greek state stopped awarding the order in 1973, following the abolishment of the monarchy. Since the abolition of the monarchy, the order is awarded by the head of the former Greek royal family.

== Grades ==
- Dame Grand Cross
- Dame Commander
- Commander
- Gold Cross
- Silver Cross

== Grand Mistresses ==
- 1936 – 1947: Queen Elena, The Queen Mother of Romania (née Princess Eléni of Greece)
- 1947 – 1964: Queen Freideríki (née Princess Frederica of Hanover)
- 1964 – 2023: Queen Ánna-María (née Princess Anne-Marie of Denmark)
- 2023 – present: Crown Princess María (née Marie-Chantal Miller)

== Recipients ==
Upon the creation of the Order in January 1936, Greek Princesses and their daughters were invested in order of precedence:

1. The Queen Mother of Romania (née Princess Helen of Greece and Denmark) – Grand Mistress (1936–1947)
2. The Duchess of Aosta (née Princess Irene of Greece and Denmark) – Dame Grand Cross, Special Class
3. Princess Katherine of Greece and Denmark – Dame Grand Cross, Special Class
4. Princess Alexandra of Greece and Denmark – Dame Grand Cross, Special Class
5. Princess Maria of Greece and Denmark – Dame Grand Cross, Special Class
6. Princess Aspasia, Princess Alexander of Greece and Denmark (née Aspasia Manos) – Dame Grand Cross, Special Class
7. Princess Eugénie of Greece and Denmark – Dame Grand Cross, 1st Class
8. Grand Duchess Maria Pavlovna of Russia – Dame Grand Cross, 1st Class
9. Princess Olga of Greece and Denmark – Dame Grand Cross, 1st Class
10. Princess Elizabeth, Countess of Törring-Jettenbach (née Princess Elizabeth of Greece and Denmark) – Dame Grand Cross, 1st Class
11. The Duchess of Kent (née Princess Marina of Greece and Denmark) – Dame Grand Cross, 1st Class
12. Princess Nina Georgievna of Russia – Dame Grand Cross, 1st Class
13. Princess Xenia Georgievna of Russia – Dame Grand Cross, 1st Class
14. The Hereditary Princess of Hohenlohe-Langenburg (née Princess Margarita of Greece and Denmark) – Dame Grand Cross, 1st Class
15. The Margravine of Baden (née Princess Theodora of Greece and Denmark) – Dame Grand Cross, 1st Class
16. The Hereditary Grand Duchess of Hesse and by Rhine (née Princess Cecilie of Greece and Denmark) – Dame Grand Cross, 1st Class
17. Princess Sophie of Greece and Denmark – Dame Grand Cross, 1st Class
18. Princess Marie, Princess George of Greece and Denmark (née Princess Marie Bonaparte) – Dame Grand Cross, 1st Class
19. Grand Duchess Elena Vladimirovna of Russia – Dame Grand Cross, 1st Class
20. Princess Alice, Princess Andrew of Greece and Denmark (née Princess Alice of Battenberg) – Dame Grand Cross, 1st Class
21. Princess Françoise, Princess Christopher of Greece and Denmark (née Princess Françoise of Orléans) – Dame Grand Cross, 1st Class
22. Princess Margrethe, Landgravine of Hesse (née Princess Margaret of Prussia) – Dame Grand Cross, 1st Class

=== Other dames ===
- Queen Frederica (née Princess Frederica of Hanover) – Grand Mistress (1947–1964)
- The Duchess of Brunswick (née Princess Victoria Louise of Prussia) – Dame Grand Cross, Special Class
- Queen Anne of Romania (née Princess Anne of Bourbon-Parma) – Dame Grand Cross, Special Class
- Queen Mary of United Kingdom (née Princess Mary of Teck) – Dame Grand Cross, Special Class
- Queen Elizabeth of the United Kingdom (née Lady Elizabeth Bowes-Lyon) – Dame Grand Cross, Special Class
- Queen Victoria Eugenie of Spain (née Princess Victoria Eugenie of Battenberg) – Dame Grand Cross, Special Class
- The Countess of Barcelona (née Princess María de las Mercedes of Bourbon-Two Sicilies) – Dame Grand Cross, 1st Class
- Queen Ingrid of Denmark (née Princess Ingrid of Sweden) – Dame Grand Cross, Special Class
- Queen Marie-José of Italy (née Princess Marie José of Belgium) – Dame Grand Cross, Special Class
- Grand Duchess Joséphine-Charlotte of Luxembourg (née Princess Joséphine-Charlotte of Belgium) – Dame Grand Cross, Special Class
- Princess René of Bourbon-Parma (née Princess Margaret of Denmark) – Dame Grand Cross, 1st Class
- Princess Georgina of Liechtenstein (née Countess Georgina of Wilczek) – Dame Grand Cross, Special Class
- Infanta Pilar, Duchess of Badajoz – Dame Grand Cross
- Princess Tatiana Radziwiłł – Dame Grand Cross
- Princess Irene of Greece and Denmark – Dame Grand Cross, Special Class

=== Current dames ===
- Queen Anne-Marie of Greece (née Princess Anne-Marie of Denmark) – Grand Mistress (1964–2023)
- Queen Sofía of Spain (née Princess Sophia of Greece and Denmark) – Dame Grand Cross, Special Class
- Princess Beatrix of the Netherlands – Dame Grand Cross, Special Class
- Queen Margrethe II of Denmark – Dame Grand Cross, Special Class
- The Dowager Princess of Sayn-Wittgenstein-Berleburg (née Princess Benedikte of Denmark) – Dame Grand Cross, 1st Class
- The Custodian of the Crown of Romania – Dame Grand Cross, Special Class
- Infanta Margarita, Duchess of Soria – Dame Grand Cross
- Princess Alexia of Greece and Denmark – Dame Grand Cross, Special Class
- Princess Theodora of Greece and Denmark – Dame Grand Cross, Special Class
- Crown Princess Marie-Chantal of Greece (née Marie-Chantal Miller) – Grand Mistress (2023–present)
- Princess Tatiana of Greece and Denmark (née Tatiana Blatnik) – Dame Grand Cross, 1st Class
- Princess Maria-Olympia of Greece and Denmark – Dame Grand Cross, Special Class
- Princess Nina of Greece and Denmark (née Nina Nastassja Flohr) – Dame Grand Cross, 1st Class

Greek orders timeline
Orders by precedence	1832–1909	1910s	1920s		1930s	1940s	1950s	1960s	1970–present	
Order of the Redeemer	.								Rep.	
Order of Honour										Rep.
Order of Saints George and Constantine					.		.		.	Dynastic
Order of Saints Olga and Sophia					.		.		.	Dynastic
Order of George I		.			.		.		.	Dynastic
Order of the Phoenix					.					Rep.
Order of Beneficence							.			Rep.
Years										
Regime	Monarchy			Republic	Mon.	Rep.	Monarchy		Rep.	
	1832–1909	1910s	1920s		1930s	1940s	1950s	1960s	1970–present	
