= Medal for the Greco-Turkish War of 1912–1913 =

Medal for the Greco-Turkish War
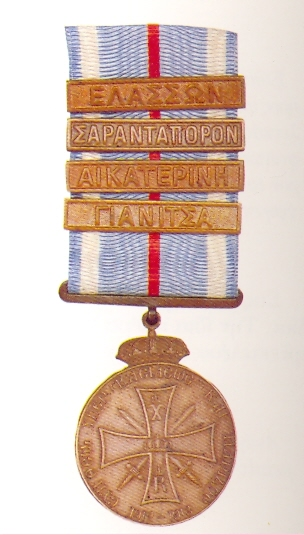
- Obverse of the medal, with military ribbon and clasps for Elasson, Sarantaporon, Aikaterini, and Gianitsa
- Type: Campaign medal
- Country: Kingdom of Greece
- Eligibility: Military and civilian service in support of the military
- Campaign: First Balkan War
- Established: 30 April 1913/17 February 1914 (O.S.)
- Ribbon bar

The Medal for the Greco-Turkish War of 1912–1913 (Greek: Μετάλλιο Ελληνοτουρκικού Πολέμου 1912-1913) is a campaign medal of Greece for participation in the First Balkan War.

== Description ==
The medal was established at the end of the First Balkan War against the Ottoman Empire, by Law 4200 of 30 April 1913, but not specified until the Royal Decree of 17 February 1914. By that time, the Second Balkan War against Bulgaria had been fought, leading to the decree also specifying the establishment of a Medal for the Greco-Bulgarian War of similar appearance.

The medal comprised a single class, with a round bronze medal topped by a small royal crown attached to it. The obverse features a cross with the royal crown in the centre, the royal cypher of King George I of Greece (r. 1863–1913) on the top arm of the cross, and the royal cypher of King Constantine I of Greece (r. 1913–1917, 1920–1922) on the lower arm of the cross. Behind the cross are two crossed swords. A circular inscription runs along the rim, spelling out ΣΥΝ ΘΕΩι ΥΠΕΡ ΒΑΣΙΛΕΩΣ ΚΑΙ ΠΑΤΡΙΔΟΣ 1912–1913 ('With God for King and Fatherland, 1912–1913), in Byzantine-style lettering. The reverse features a laurel wreath, and in the centre the names of the regions conquered by Greece during the war, also in Byzantine-style lettering: Macedonia, Epirus, and Archipelago.

The ribbon of the medal is 3.2 centimeters wide, blue edged with white stripes, and a thin red stripe in the middle. A version for non-military personnel, who rendered services to the Greek military, was also instituted, with blue and white reversed.

== Award terms ==
The period for which the medal was awarded was defined as 18 September 1912 – 30 April 1913. In addition, fourteen battle clasps were authorized for the medal for specific battles and operations:

Macedonian front

- Elasson, for the border battles on 5–7 October 1912
- Sarantaporon, for the namesake series of battles on 5–11 October 1912
- Aikaterini, for the period 14–16 October 1912
- Sorovich, for the namesake battle and related clashes on 13–24 October 1912)
- Gianitsa, for the namesake battle and related events on 16–26 October 1912), including also operations for the occupation of Chalcidice and the Pangaion Hills
- Ostrovon, for the namesake battle and other operations in Western Macedonia (capture of Florina, Grevena, etc.) on 15 October – 8 November 1912
- Korytsa, for the operations in the area of Korçë on 1–6 December 1912

Epirus front

- Pesta, for the border battles and early advance into Epirus, 5 October – 30 November 1912
- Driskos, for the actions of the Metsovo Detachment in the Pindus Mountains from 5 October 1912 to 10 January 1913
- Aetorrachi, for the actions south of Ioannina in the period 1 December 1912 – 10 January 1913
- Ioannina, for the capture of Ioannina and all operations in Epirus under the command of then-Crown Prince Constantine, from 10 January 1913 to war's end

Naval operations in the Aegean

- Elli, for naval operations in the period 5 October – 31 December 1912
- Lemnos, for naval operations in the period from 1 January 1913 to war's end
- Lesbos-Chios, for the capture of the islands of the eastern Aegean

Two additional clasps were instituted, for those wounded in action, featuring two crossed swords, and for those killed in action, featuring a Greek cross. Only military personnel directly involved in combat was liable for the award of a clasp. Awardees of the non-military version, as well as military personnel that served only in the rear services, military staffs, hospitals, etc. did not have the right to a clasp. The bars were worn by chronological order, with the first on top.

== Sources ==
- Karalis, D. (1929). "Μετάλλια". Μεγάλη Στρατιωτικὴ καὶ Ναυτικὴ Ἐγκυκλοπαιδεία. Tόμος Τέταρτος: Καβάδης–Μωριάς [Great Military and Naval Encyclopaedia. Volume IV: Kavadh–Morea] (in Greek). Athens: Ἔκδοσις Μεγάλης Στρατιωτικῆς καὶ Ναυτικῆς Ἐγκυκλοπαιδείας. pp. 513–515. OCLC 31255024.
- Papadakis, V. P. (1934). "Παράσημα" [Decorations]. Μεγάλη Ἐλληνικὴ Ἐγκυκλοπαιδεῖα, Τόμος Δέκατος. Ἑλλάς – Ἑλληνισμὸς (in Greek). Athens: Pyrsos Co. Ltd. pp. 243–244.
- "Περὶ συστάσεως ἀναμνηστικῶν μεταλλίων τῶν κατὰ τῆς Τουρκίας και Βουλγαρίας πολέμων καὶ ἀπονομῆς αὐτῶν" [On the establishment of commemorative medals for the wars against Turkey and Bulgaria and their award]. Government Gazette of the Kingdom of Greece, Vol. I Issue 43 (in Greek). Athens: National Printing Office: 181–186. 19 February 1914.
