= Order of the Phoenix (Greece) =

Order of chivalry in Greece

Order of the Phoenix Τάγμα του Φοίνικος
- Grand Cross and Star of the Order of the Phoenix, III. type

Awarded by the President of the Hellenic Republic
- Type: Order
- Established: 13 May 1926
- Country: Greece
- Motto: Εκ της τέφρας μου αναγεννώμαι
- Awarded for: excellence in the public sphere or raising Greece's international standing
- Status: Currently constituted
- Grades: Grand Cross; Grand Commander; Commander; Golden Cross; Silver Cross

Precedence
- Next (higher): Order of Honour
- Next (lower): Order of Beneficence
- Ribbon bar of the Silver Cross of the Order of the Phoenix

The Order of the Phoenix (Greek: Τάγμα του Φοίνικος, romanized: Tágma tou Foínikos) is an order of Greece, established on 13 May 1926, by the republican government of the Second Hellenic Republic to replace the defunct Royal Order of George I.

The order was retained after the restoration of the monarchy in 1935 and continues to be awarded by the current Third Republic.

The honour is bestowed by the Greek government to Greek citizens who have excelled in the arts and literature, science, public administration, shipping, commerce, and industry. It is also awarded to foreigners who have helped raise Greece's international prestige.

== Grades ==
The Order has five classes:

- Grand Cross ('Μεγαλόσταυρος') - wears the badge of the Order on a sash on the right shoulder, and the star of the Order on the left chest;
- Grand Commander ('Ανώτερος Ταξιάρχης') - wears the badge of the Order on a necklet, and the star of the Order on the right chest;
- Commander ('Ταξιάρχης') - wears the badge of the Order on a necklet;
- Officer or Gold Cross ('Χρυσούς Σταυρός') - wears the badge on a ribbon on the left chest;
- Member or Silver Cross ('Αργυρούς Σταυρός') - wears the badge on a ribbon on the left chest.

== Insignia ==
The badge of the Order is a white-enameled cross, in silver for the Silver Cross class, in gold for the higher classes, with the Phoenix (symbolizing the rebirth of the Hellenic nation) at the centre. A five-pointed star is at the upper arm of the cross. The first version of the Order (1926–1935) featured the letters "E-T-T-A" in Byzantine uncial on each arm of the cross, the initials of the motto Εκ της τέφρας μου αναγεννώμαι ("From my ashes I am reborn"). During the Monarchy (1935–1973) the letters were removed, and the badge was topped by a crown, while the badge's reverse side featured the monogram of the reigning monarch. The current version (since 1975) omits the crown, while the reverse features the Greek National Emblem with the words ΕΛΛΗΝΙΚΗ ΔΗΜΟΚΡΑΤΙΑ ("Hellenic Republic").

The star of the Order is a silver eight-pointed star with straight rays, with the phoenix at the centre; during the Monarchy it was topped by a crown.

The ribbon of the Order is orange with black edges.

Crossed swords on the insignia indicate that the award was given in the military division of the Order.

== Holders ==
Holder	Date	Grade
Gjergj Fishta	1931	—
Sir Julien Cahn	1931	Grand Commander
Henry Vollam Morton	1937	Commander
Nicholas Hammond	1946	Officer (with swords)
Thomas Dunbabin	1946	(with swords)
Sir Arthur Coningham	1946	Grand Cross
Constantine II of Greece	1950	Grand Cross
Prince Philip, Duke of Edinburgh	1950	Grand Cross
Sir Allan Ross Welsh	1950	Grand Commander
John S. Paraskevopoulos	1950	Commander
Mark Mindler	—	-
Gavin Merrick Long	1956	Officer
Wan Waithayakon	1956	Grand Cross
Carl Foreman	1962	-
Elizabeth II of the United Kingdom	1963	Grand Cross
Harald V of Norway	1964	Grand Cross
Odysseas Elytis	1965	Commander
John S. Latsis	1965	Grand Cross
Spyridon Vikatos	1967	Commander
Arne Skaug	unknown	Commander
Stavros Niarchos	1977	Commander
Max van der Stoel	1977	Grand Cross
Mounir Abou Fadel	1984	Grand Commander
Manolis Andronikos	1992	Grand Cross
Michel Guérin	1993	Officer
Marianne McDonald	1994	Commander
Vasso Apostolopoulos	1997	Commander
Manuel Aroney	1998	Commander
Eleni Bakopanos	1999	Commander
John Cannis	1999	Commander
Peter Delefes	1999	Commander
Philippe Deane Gigantes	1999	Commander
Jim Karygiannis	1999	Commander
Christos Sirros	1999	Commander
Grigoris Bithikotsis	2003	Officer
Rena Vlahopoulou	2003	Officer
Sir Patrick Leigh Fermor	2007	Commander
Thanasis Veggos	2008	Commander
Paul Sarbanes	2008	Grand Cross
Vahram Kazhoyan	2009	Grand Cross
Angelos Chaniotis	2013	Commander
Yehuda Poliker	2014	unknown
Stephen Fry	2021	Grand Commander
Frangoulis Frangos	unknown	Grand Commander / Commander / Officer
Jacqueline de Romilly	1977	Commander
Donald Kagan	2021	unknown
Gus Bilirakis	2024	Grand Commander

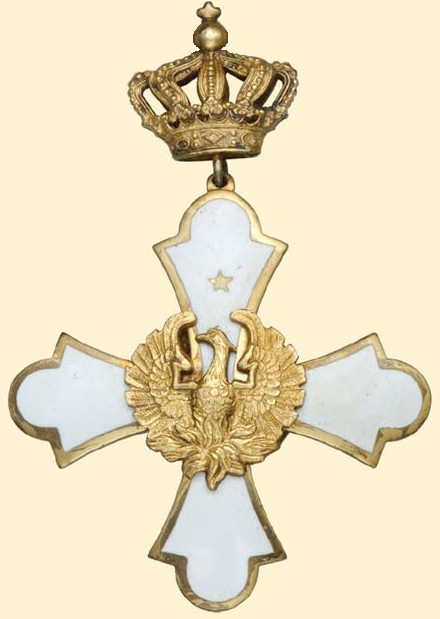
Monarchy – Order of the Phoenix badge

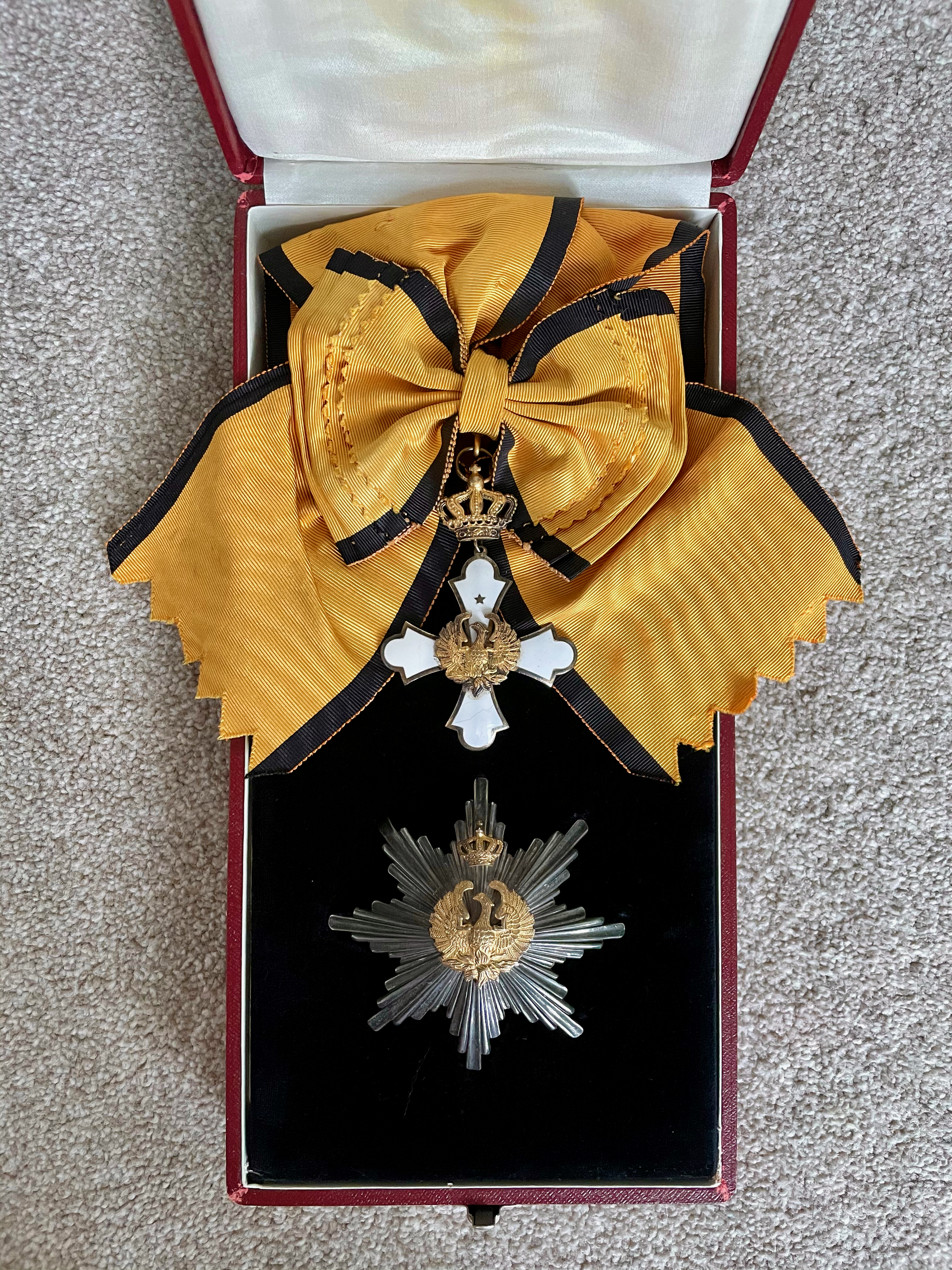
Monarchy – Order of the Phoenix – Grand Cross

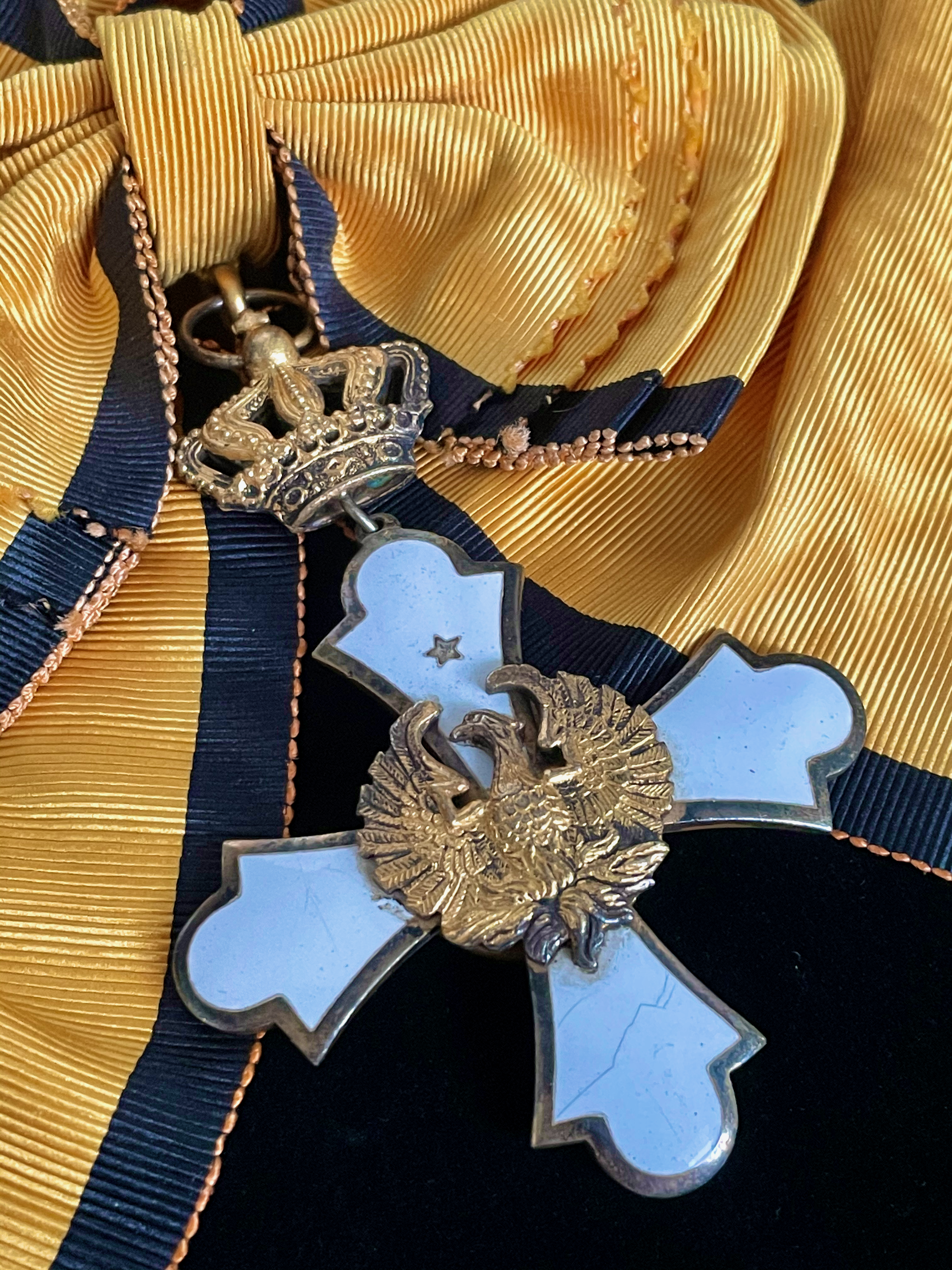
Monarchy – Order of the Phoenix – Grand Cross badge

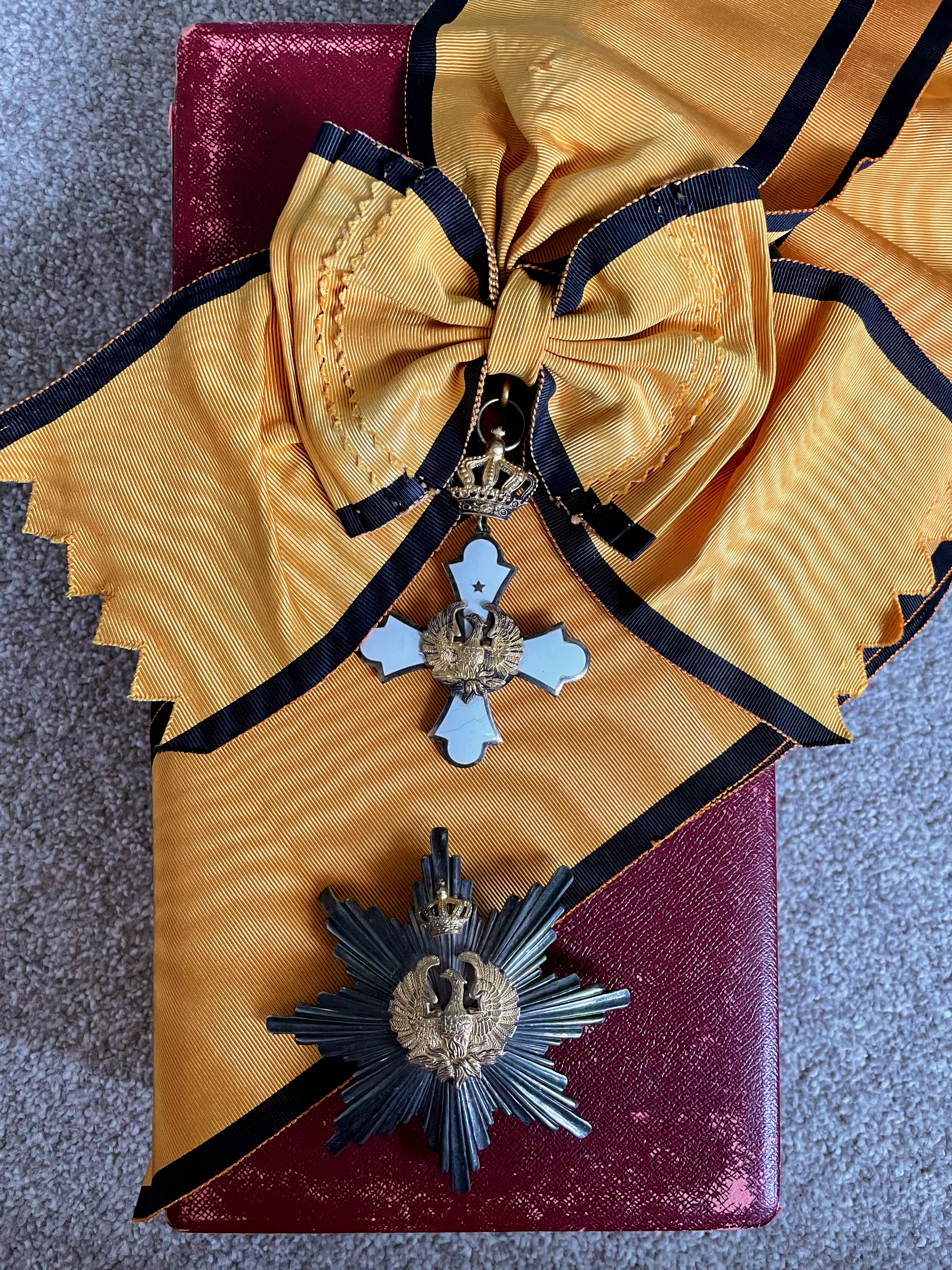
Monarchy – Order of the Phoenix – Grand Cross set

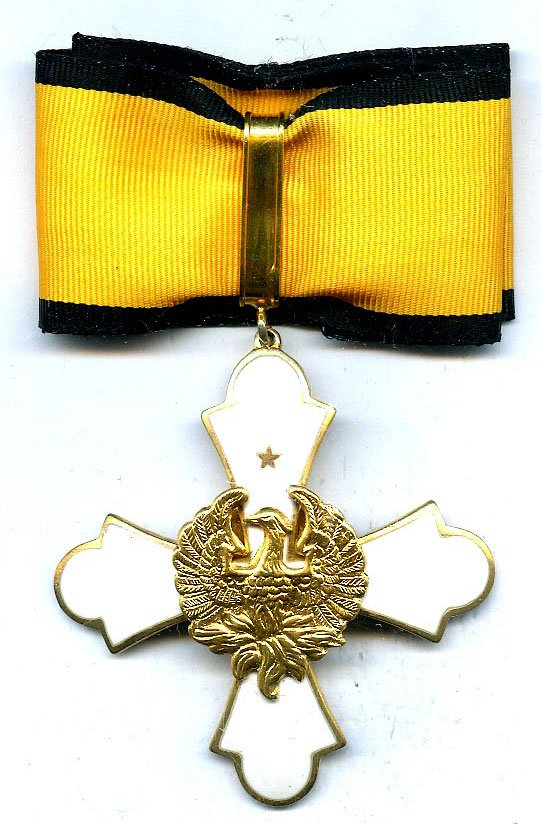
Republic – Order of the Phoenix, Third Class Commander

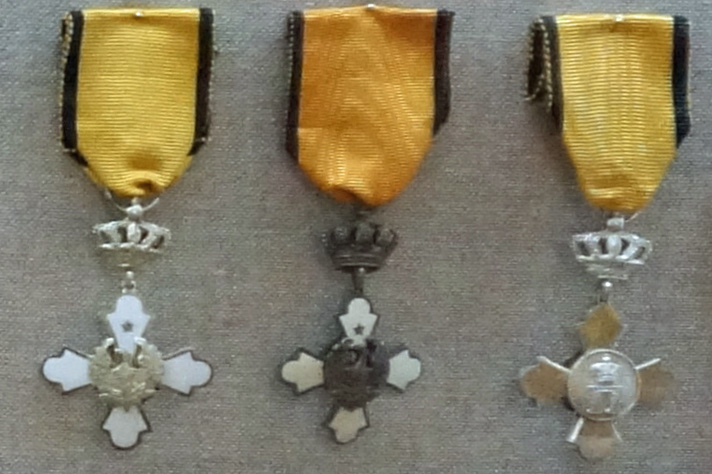
Monarchy – Three Silver knights of the Phoenix

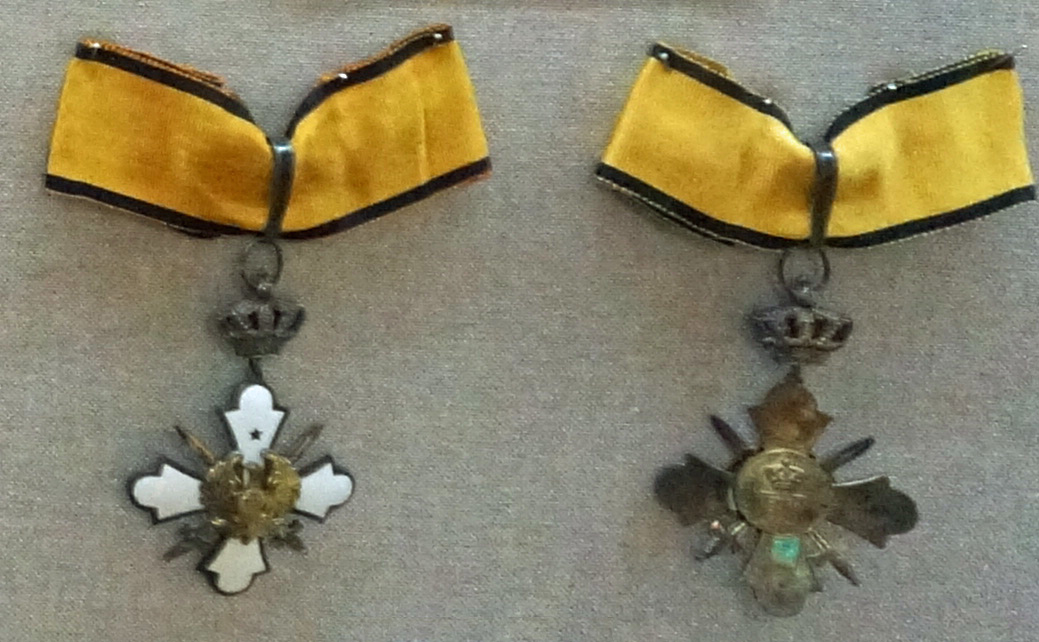
Monarchy – Third Class Commander with swords

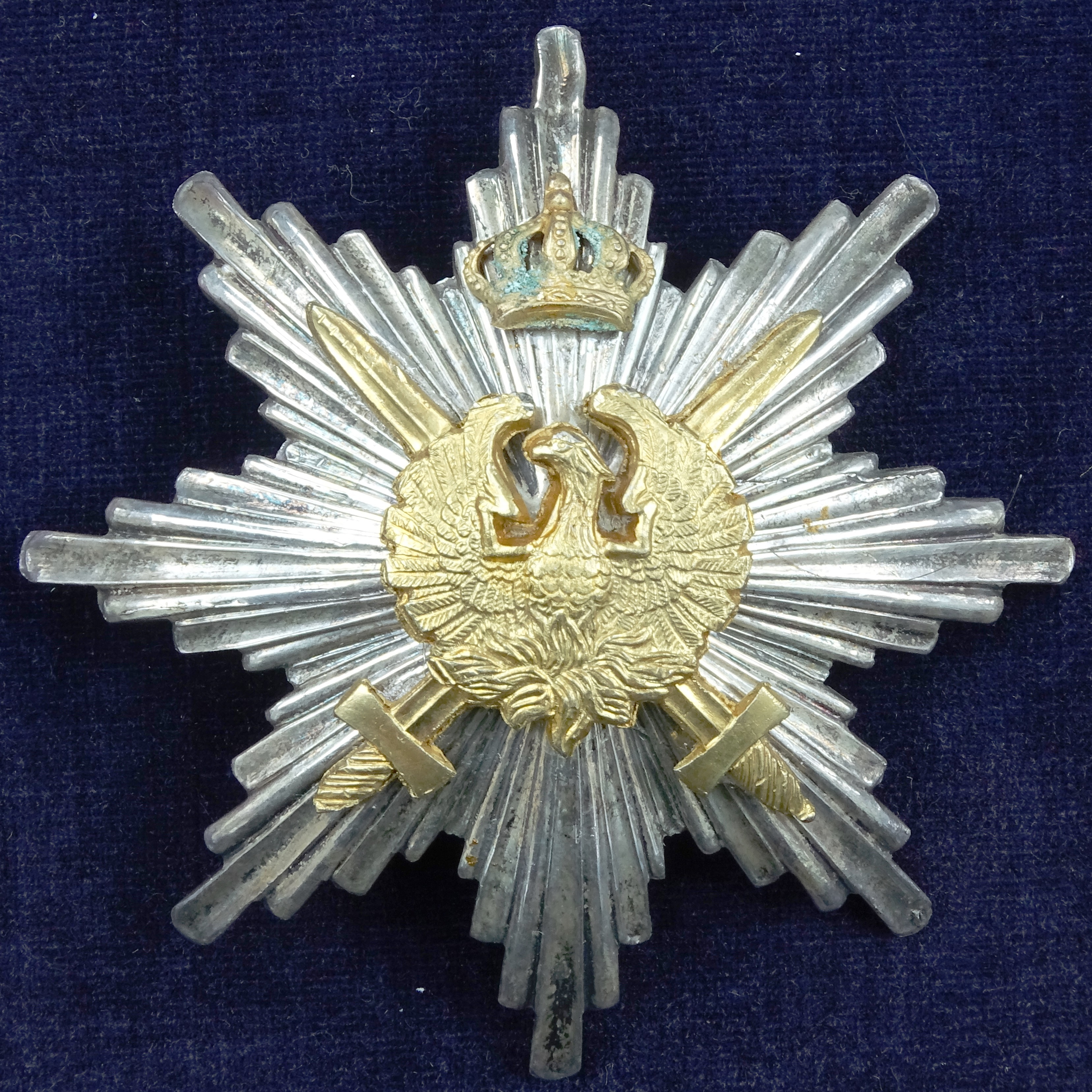
Monarchy – Grand Cross star with swords

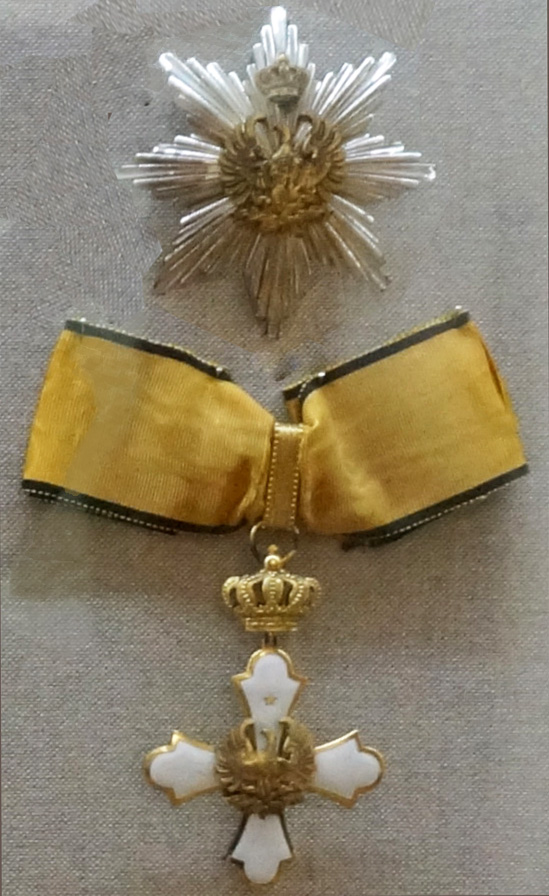
Monarchy – Second Class Grand Commander

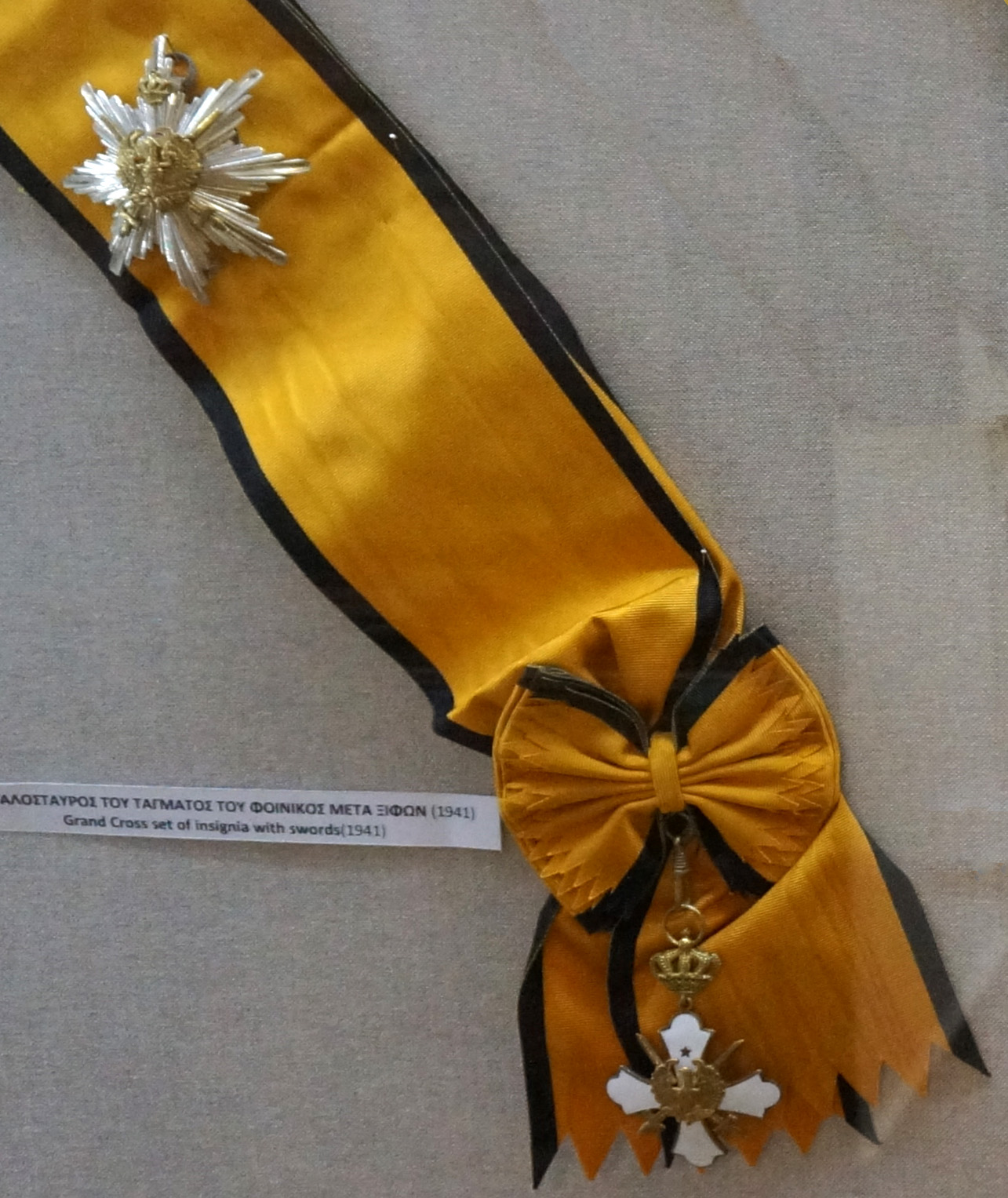
Monarchy – Grand Cross set with swords

Greek orders timeline
Orders by precedence	1832–1909	1910s	1920s		1930s	1940s	1950s	1960s	1970–present	
Order of the Redeemer	.								Rep.	
Order of Honour										Rep.
Order of Saints George and Constantine					.		.		.	Dynastic
Order of Saints Olga and Sophia					.		.		.	Dynastic
Order of George I		.			.		.		.	Dynastic
Order of the Phoenix					.					Rep.
Order of Beneficence							.			Rep.
Years										
Regime	Monarchy			Republic	Mon.	Rep.	Monarchy		Rep.	
	1832–1909	1910s	1920s		1930s	1940s	1950s	1960s	1970–present	
