= Medal for the Greco-Bulgarian War =

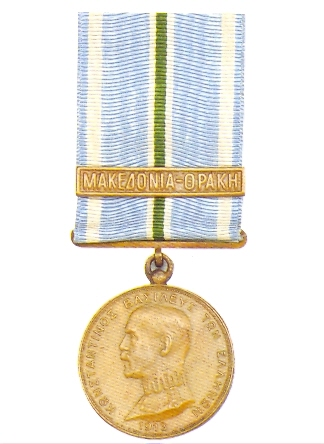
- Obverse of the medal with military ribbon and clasp for Macedonia-Thrace
- Type: Campaign medal
- Country: Kingdom of Greece
- Eligibility: Military and civilian service in support of the military
- Campaign: Second Balkan War
- Established: 17 February 1914 (O.S.)
- Ribbon bar

The Medal for the Greco-Bulgarian War (Greek: Μετάλλιο Ελληνοβουλγαρικού Πολέμου) is a campaign medal of Greece for participation in the Second Balkan War.

== Description ==
The medal was established alongside the similar Medal for the Greco-Turkish War of 1912–1913 by the Royal Decree of 17 February 1914.

It comprised a single class, with a round bronze medal bearing on the obverse a bust of King Constantine I of Greece, surrounded by the inscription ΚΩΝΣΤΑΝΤΙΝΟΣ ΒΑΣΙΛΕΥΣ ΤΩΝ ΕΛΛΗΝΩΝ 1913 ('Constantine, King of the Hellenes, 1913'), and on the reverse a bust of the Byzantine emperor Basil II the Bulgar Slayer with the inscription ΒΑΣΙΛΕΙΟΣ Β′ 976–1025 ('Basil II, 976–1025') in Byzantine-style letters. Following the National Schism, soldiers of the Provisional Government of National Defence, that was set up in opposition to King Constantine, wore the latter side as the obverse.

The ribbon of the medal is 3.2 centimeters wide, blue edged with white stripes, and a thin green stripe in the middle. A version for non-military personnel, who rendered services to the Greek military, was also instituted, with blue and white reversed.

== Award terms ==
The period for which the medal was awarded was defined as 20 February – 26 July 1913. In addition, four battle clasps were authorized for the medal for specific battles and operations:

- Kilkis-Lachanas, for the opening period of the war, from 16–21 June 1913, as well as clashes in the Mount Pangaion area before the formal outbreak of hostilities, as far back as 20 February
- Beles, for the Greek advance northwards, from 22–27 June 1913
- Kresna-Djumaya, for the final battles of the war in the Kresna Gorge area, from 6–17 July 1913
- Nevrokopion, for all operations east of the River Strymon

An additional clasp for Macedonia-Thrace was later added to cover landing operations on the Aegean coast during the war. In addition, there were special clasps, for those wounded in action, featuring two crossed swords, and for those killed in action, featuring a Greek cross. Only military personnel directly involved in combat was liable for the award of a clasp. Awardees of the non-military version, as well as military personnel that served only in the rear services, military staffs, hospitals, etc. did not have the right to a clasp. The bars were worn by chronological order, with the first on top.

== Sources ==
- Karalis, D. (1929). "Μετάλλια". Μεγάλη Στρατιωτικὴ καὶ Ναυτικὴ Ἐγκυκλοπαιδεία. Tόμος Τέταρτος: Καβάδης–Μωριάς [Great Military and Naval Encyclopaedia. Volume IV: Kavadh–Morea] (in Greek). Athens: Ἔκδοσις Μεγάλης Στρατιωτικῆς καὶ Ναυτικῆς Ἐγκυκλοπαιδείας. pp. 513–515. OCLC 31255024.
- Papadakis, V. P. (1934). "Παράσημα" [Decorations]. Μεγάλη Ἐλληνικὴ Ἐγκυκλοπαιδεῖα, Τόμος Δέκατος. Ἑλλάς – Ἑλληνισμὸς (in Greek). Athens: Pyrsos Co. Ltd. pp. 243–244.
- "Περὶ συστάσεως ἀναμνηστικῶν μεταλλίων τῶν κατὰ τῆς Τουρκίας και Βουλγαρίας πολέμων καὶ ἀπονομῆς αὐτῶν" [On the establishment of commemorative medals for the wars against Turkey and Bulgaria and their award]. Government Gazette of the Kingdom of Greece, Vol. I Issue 43 (in Greek). Athens: National Printing Office: 181–186. 19 February 1914.
