= Order of George I =

Greek order of merit

Royal Order of George I Βασιλικόν Τάγμα Γεωργίου Α'
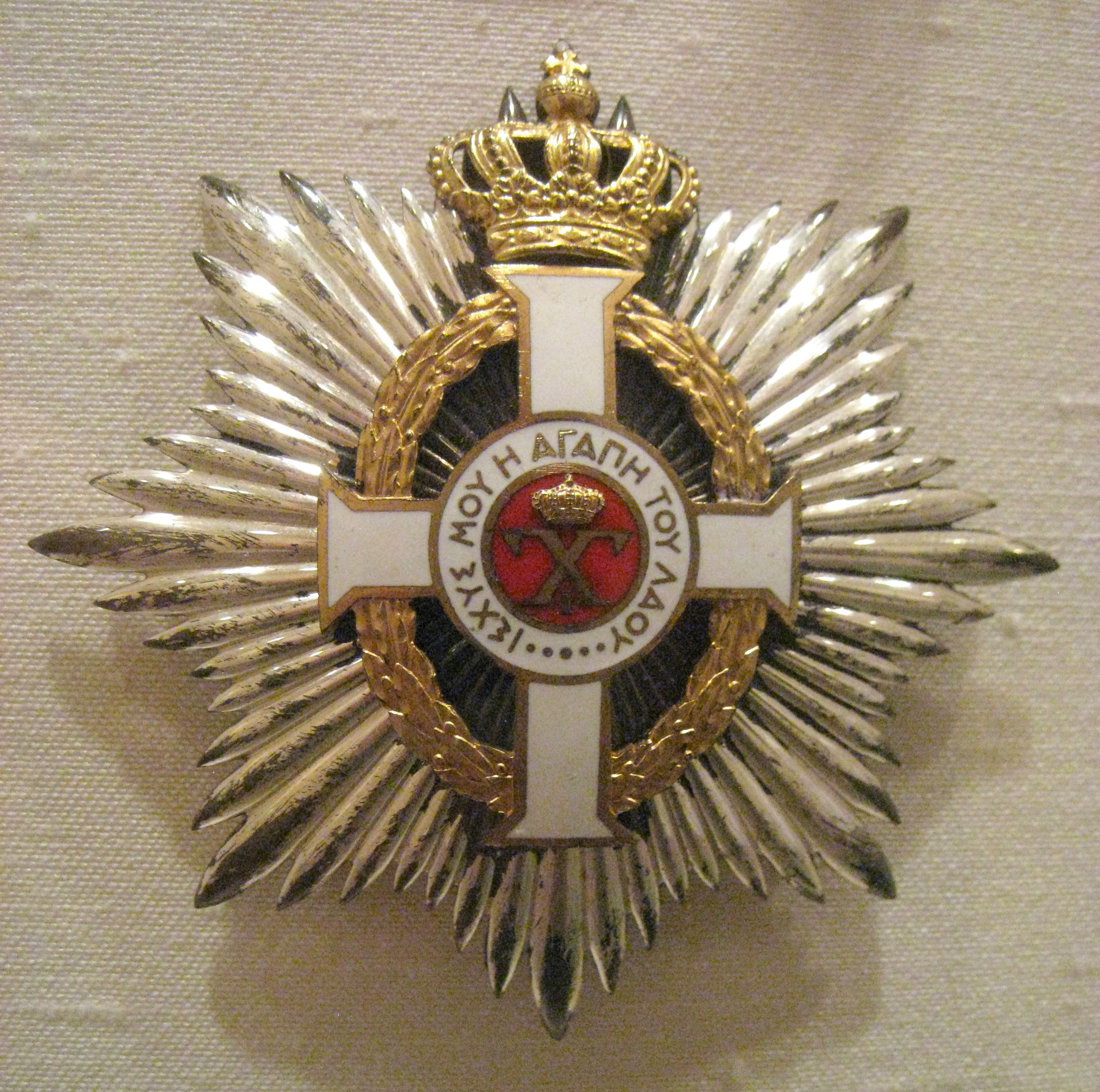
- Star of the Grand Cross of the Order of George I (civil division)
- Type: Dynastic order
- Established: 16 January 1915
- Royal house: House of Glücksburg (Greek royal family)
- Motto: ΙΣΧΥΣ ΜΟΥ Η ΑΓΑΠΗ ΤΟΥ ΛΑΟΥ (THE LOVE OF MY PEOPLE IS MY STRENGTH)
- Awarded for: distinguished services to Greece
- Status: No longer awarded
- Grand Master: Pavlos
- Grades: Knight Grand Cross; Knight Grand Commander; Knight Commander; Knight Officer; Knight

Statistics
- First induction: 1915 King Constantine I of Greece
- Last induction: 2008 Prince Philippos of Greece and Denmark

Precedence
- Next (higher): Royal Order of Saints George and Constantine; Royal Order of Saints Olga and Sophia
- Next (lower): Royal Order of the Phoenix

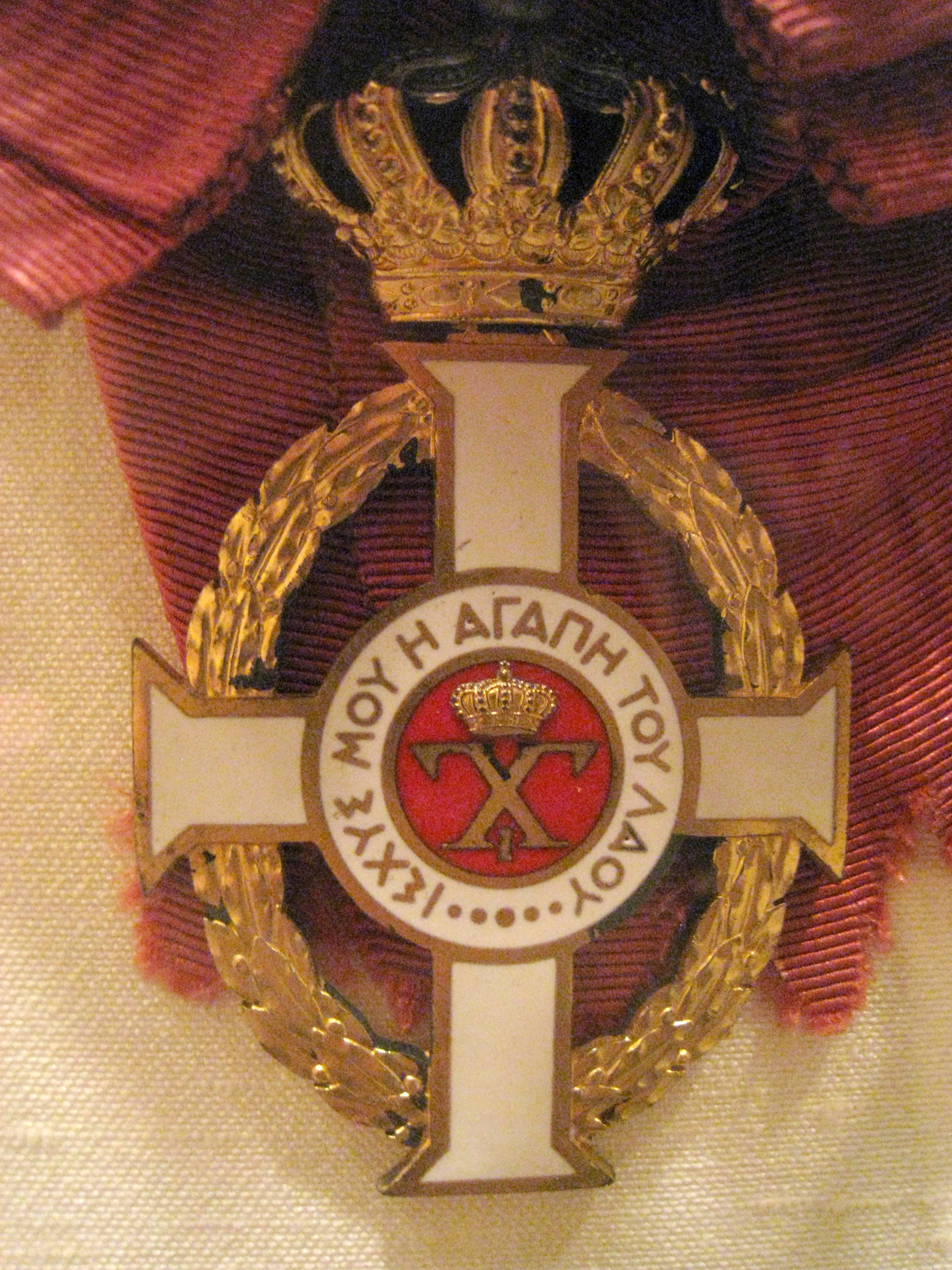
Badge of a Grand Cross of the order

The Royal Order of George I (Greek: Βασιλικόν Τάγμα Γεωργίου Α') is a Greek order instituted by King Constantine I in 1915. Since the monarchy's abolition in 1973, it has been considered a dynastic order of the former Greek royal family.

== History ==
The order was founded in 1915 by King Constantine I in honor of his father, George I. It was only the second Greek order to be created after the Order of the Redeemer in 1833, and remained the second senior award of the Greek state for the duration of its existence. The order was closely associated with the Greek monarchy, and was hence abolished with the establishment of the Second Hellenic Republic in 1924, to be replaced with the Order of the Phoenix. The order was restored along with the monarchy in 1935, and continued to be awarded until the final abolition of the monarchy in 1973. It was replaced by the Third Hellenic Republic in 1975 by the Order of Honour.

== Grades ==
The Order has five classes:

- Grand Cross - wears the badge of the Order on a sash on the right shoulder and the star of the Order on the left chest;
- Grand Commander - wears the badge of the Order on a necklet, and the star of the Order on the left chest;
- Commander - wears the badge of the Order on a necklet;
- Gold Cross - wears the badge on a ribbon on the left chest;
- Silver Cross - wears the badge on a ribbon on the left chest.

A sixth, supreme class comprising a Collar of the order was originally envisaged, but never realized.

As the Order was restricted to officers and senior state officials, an additional Commemorative Medal of the Order of George I (Αναμνηστικόν μετάλλιον του Τάγματος Γεωργίου Α') was instituted in 1915 for NCOs and common soldiers, junior officials and ordinary citizens. It had initially two classes, silver and bronze, with a third in gold added after 1935.

Ribbon bars
Grand Cross	Grand Commander	Commander	Gold Cross or Officer	Silver Cross or Member

== Insignia ==
The badge of the Order is a white-enamelled Latin cross pattée, in silver for the Silver Cross class, in gold for the higher classes, with a wreath of laurels between the arms of the cross. The obverse central disc was in red enamel, bearing the royal cypher of George I, two crossed gammas with a crown above and a "I" below, surrounded by a white enamel ring bearing the royal motto ΙΣΧΥΣ ΜΟΥ Η ΑΓΑΠΗ ΤΟΥ ΛΑΟΥ ("The Love of My People is My Strength"). The reverse central disc bears the years of George I's reign, 1863-1913. The badge is topped by a crown; the military division also had crossed swords behind the badge. The Commemorative Medal's badge is identical in design, except that the cross is not enameled.

The star of the order is a silver star with straight rays, with eight points for Grand Cross and four points for Grand Commander, and with the obverse of the badge superimposed upon it.

The ribbon of the Order is plain crimson red.

Greek orders timeline
Orders by precedence	1832–1909	1910s	1920s		1930s	1940s	1950s	1960s	1970–present	
Order of the Redeemer	.								Rep.	
Order of Honour										Rep.
Order of Saints George and Constantine					.		.		.	Dynastic
Order of Saints Olga and Sophia					.		.		.	Dynastic
Order of George I		.			.		.		.	Dynastic
Order of the Phoenix					.					Rep.
Order of Beneficence							.			Rep.
Years										
Regime	Monarchy			Republic	Mon.	Rep.	Monarchy		Rep.	
	1832–1909	1910s	1920s		1930s	1940s	1950s	1960s	1970–present	
