= Order of Saints George and Constantine =

Greek royal order of chivalry

Royal Family Order of Saints George and Constantine Τάγμα των Αγίων Γεωργίου και Κωνσταντίνου
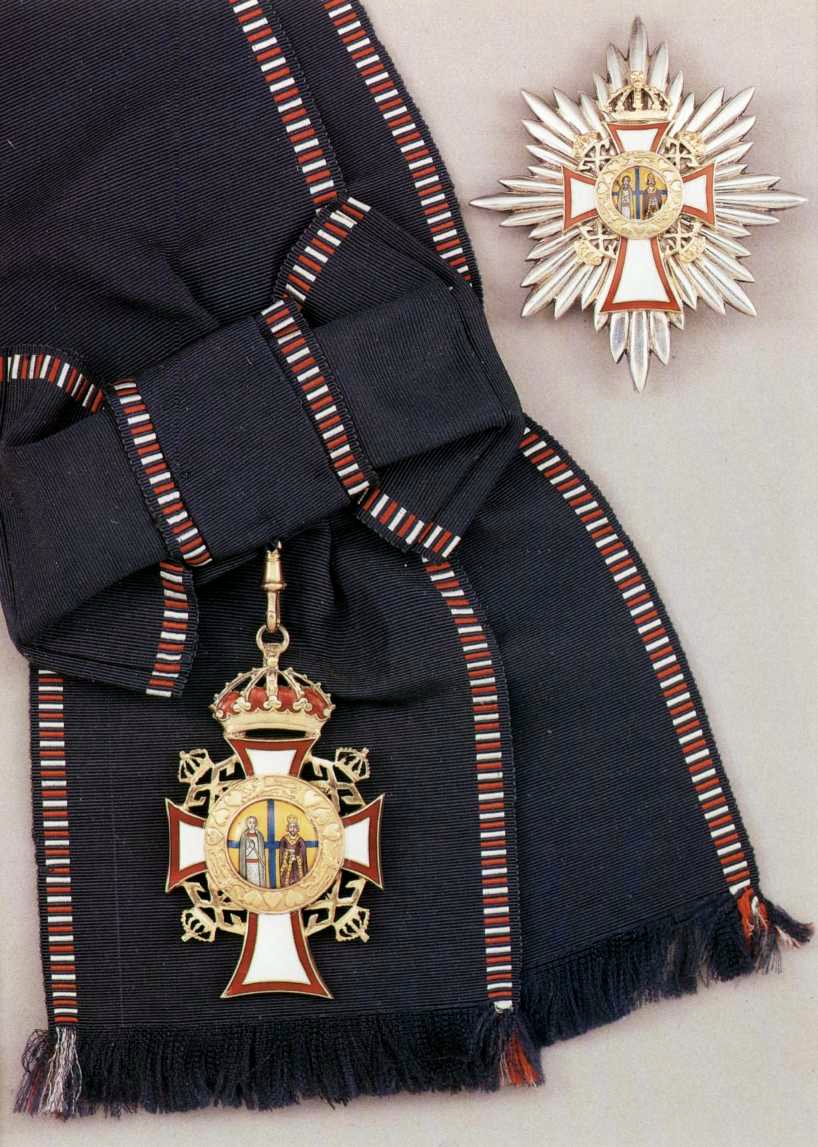
- Star and Grand Cross of the Order of Saints George and Constantine

Awarded by the head of the Greek royal family
- Type: Order
- Motto: ΙΣΧΥΣ ΜΟΥ, Η ΑΓΑΠΗ ΤΟΥ ΛΑΟΥ
- Awarded for: At the monarch's pleasure and personal services to the Crown
- Status: Not awarded as a Greek order since 1973, but still awarded by the Greek royal family
- Grades: Grand Cross; Grand Commander; Commander; Knight's Gold Cross; Knight's Silver Cross

Statistics
- First induction: 1936 King George II of Greece
- Last induction: 2012 Prince Philippos of Greece and Denmark

Precedence
- Next (higher): Royal Order of the Redeemer
- Next (lower): Royal Order of George I
- Equivalent: Royal Order of Saints Olga and Sophia
- Ribbon of the Order of Saints George and Constantine

The Royal Family Order of Saints George and Constantine (Greek: Βασιλικόν Οἰκογενειακόν Τάγμα Ἁγίων Γεωργίου καὶ Κωνσταντίνου, romanized: Vasilikon Oikogeneiakon Tagma Agion Georgiou kai Konstantinou) is an order of the Greek royal family. For the duration of its existence, it has been the second highest decoration awarded by the modern Greek state and the Greek crown, after the Order of the Redeemer. It was instituted in January 1936 by King George II in the memory of his grandfather (King George I) and his father (King Constantine I). The order is awarded only to men, while the corresponding Order of Saints Olga and Sophia is reserved for women. The order's design was influenced by the royal family's Danish origin, evoking the appearance of the Order of the Dannebrog. The order is not awarded since 1975 by the Greek state after the abolition of monarchy and today is awarded only by the former Greek royal family.

== Grades ==
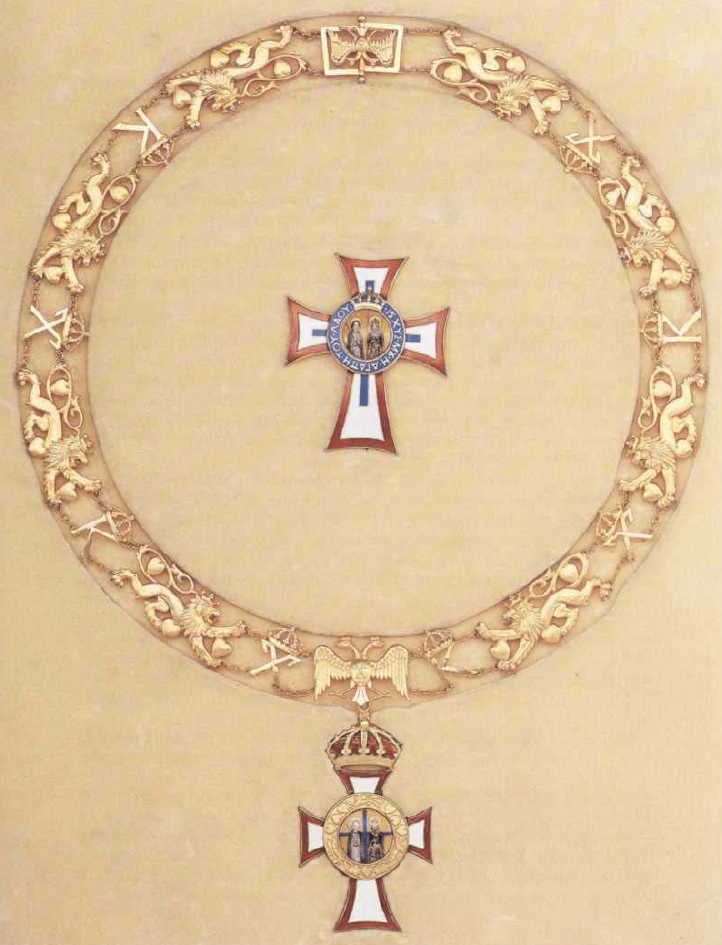
Collar of the Order of Saints George and Constantine, featuring Byzantine double-headed eagles, the lions and hearts of the coat of arms of Denmark, and the royal cyphers of Kings George I and Constantine I.

The Order has six classes:

- Collar ('Περιδέραιον') - wears the badge of the Order on a chain round the neck and the distinctive star of the Order on the left chest;
- Grand Cross ('Μεγαλόσταυρος') - wears the badge of the Order on a collar or on a sash on the right shoulder, and the star of the Order on the left chest;
- Grand Commander ('Ανώτερος Ταξιάρχης') - wears the badge and the star of the Order on the right chest;
- Commander ('Ταξιάρχης') - wears the badge of the Order on a necklet;
- Gold Cross ('Χρυσούς Σταυρός') - wears the badge on a ribbon on the left chest;
- Silver Cross ('Αργυρούς Σταυρός') - wears the badge on a ribbon on the left chest.

Greek orders timeline
Orders by precedence	1832–1909	1910s	1920s		1930s	1940s	1950s	1960s	1970–present	
Order of the Redeemer	.								Rep.	
Order of Honour										Rep.
Order of Saints George and Constantine					.		.		.	Dynastic
Order of Saints Olga and Sophia					.		.		.	Dynastic
Order of George I		.			.		.		.	Dynastic
Order of the Phoenix					.					Rep.
Order of Beneficence							.			Rep.
Years										
Regime	Monarchy			Republic	Mon.	Rep.	Monarchy		Rep.	
	1832–1909	1910s	1920s		1930s	1940s	1950s	1960s	1970–present	
