= Medal for the Macedonian Struggle =

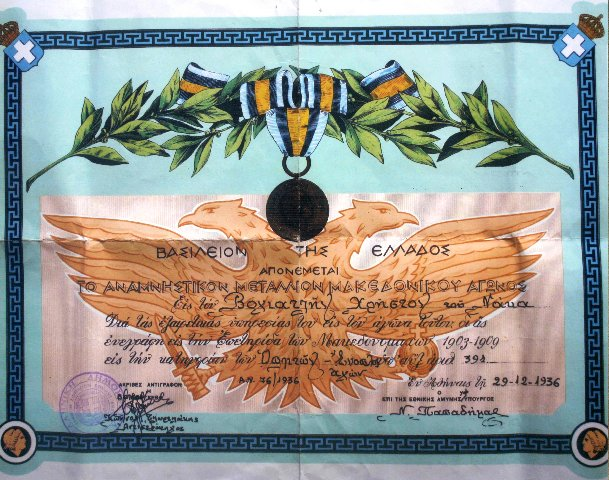
Diploma of the medal in the 1936 version, awarded to Christos Vogiatzis

The Commemorative Medal for the Macedonian Struggle 1903–1909 (Greek: Αναμνηστικόν Μετάλλιο Μακεδονικού Αγώνος 1903 - 1909) was a campaign medal established by the Second Hellenic Republic in 1931 and awarded to participants of the Macedonian Struggle.

== History ==
The medal was established with Law 5168 of 1931, which also regulated the issuing of pensions and benefits to the fighters of the Macedonian Struggle and their children.

The medal was issued in three classes:

- 1st Class, to those killed in action, as well as members of the Macedonian Committee, head agents and chief organizers, and career officers and NCOs of the Greek military
- 2nd Class, to representatives of the Macedonian Committee, and guerrilla chieftains of the 1st and 2nd Class
- 3rd Class, to ordinary soldiers and private individuals

== Description ==
The obverse of the medal features the head of Alexander the Great, surrounded by the legend ΜΑΚΕΔΟΝΙΚΟΣ ΑΓΩΝ 1903–1909 ('Macedonian Struggle 1903–1909'). The obverse features a phoenix rising from its ashes, used as a national emblem by the Second Hellenic Republic and retained after 1935 by the restored Greek monarchy. The legend of the obverse was originally ΕΛΛΗΝΙΚΗ ΔΗΜΟΚΡΑΤΙΑ ('Hellenic Republic') with the date 1931, but was changed to ΒΑΣΙΛΕΙΟΝ ΤΗΣ ΕΛΛΑΔΟΣ ('Kingdom of Greece') with the date 1936 after the restoration of the monarchy.

The ribbon of the medal was striped light blue-black-golden yellow-black-light blue, with the central stripe twice as broad as the outer ones. Classes were denoted by devices on the ribbon, similar to the practice used in the Greek War Cross of 1917: the 1st Class was denoted by a bronze palm, while the 2nd Class was denoted by a bronze star. The 3rd Class was plain.
