= Order of the Redeemer =

Order of chivalry in Greece

Order of the Redeemer Τάγμα του Σωτήρος
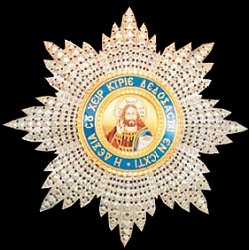
- Star of the Order of the Redeemer

Awarded by the President of the Hellenic Republic
- Type: Order
- Motto: Η ΔΕΞΙΑ ΣΟΥ ΧΕΙΡ, ΚΥΡΙΕ, ΔΕΔΟΞΑΣΤΑΙ ΕΝ ΙΣΧΥΙ (Thy right hand, O Lord, is become glorious in power.)
- Awarded for: Exceptional services to Greece
- Status: Currently constituted
- Grades: Grand Cross, Grand Commander, Commander, Gold Cross, Silver Cross

Precedence
- Next (higher): None
- Next (lower): Order of Honour
- Ribbon bar

The Order of the Redeemer (Greek: Τάγμα του Σωτήρος, romanized: Tágma tou Sotíros), also known as the Order of the Saviour, is an order of merit of Greece. The Order of the Redeemer is the oldest and highest decoration awarded by the modern Greek state.

== Establishment ==
The establishment of the Order of the Redeemer was decided by the Fourth National Assembly at Argos in 1829, during the final year of the Greek War of Independence. The decision was not immediately implemented, however, and the relevant decree was signed in Nafplio by the Regency Council (Josef Ludwig von Armansperg, Karl von Abel and Georg Ludwig von Maurer) in the name of King Otto on May 20, 1833. According to the decree of establishment, the name of the Order "shall recall the, by divine assistance miraculously and fortuitously accomplished, salvation of Greece".

== Grades and award criteria ==
Since its establishment in 1833, and in common with all Greek orders of merit, the Order of the Redeemer has five classes:

- Grand Cross ('Μεγαλόσταυρος') – wears the badge of the Order on a sash on the right shoulder, and the star of the Order on the left chest;
- Grand Commander ('Ανώτερος Ταξιάρχης') – wears the badge of the Order on a necklet, and the star of the Order on the right chest;
- Commander ('Ταξιάρχης') - wears the badge of the Order on a necklet;
- Gold Cross ('Χρυσούς Σταυρός') – wears the badge on a ribbon on the left chest;
- Silver Cross ('Αργυρούς Σταυρός') – wears the badge on a ribbon on the left chest.

According to the original decree, the Order was to be awarded to those Greek citizens who took part in the War of Independence, or "who should distinguish themselves henceforth in any branch of public service, in the army and navy, in the diplomatic and judicial corps, in public administration, in the arts, science, agriculture and industry, commerce, or should distinguish themselves in any other social field through outstanding civic virtue, and through illustrious services to the Throne, for the Glory of the Hellenic name and for the welfare of the fatherland", while foreigners were admitted either for past services to Greece, or due to their ability "to bring honour to the Order, through their outstanding personal virtues and excellence".

The original decree set specific limits on the number of awards: while the Silver Cross could be awarded at will, Gold Crosses were limited to 120, Commanders to 30, Grand Commanders to 20, and Grand Crosses to 12. Foreign recipients and princes of the Greek royal family did not count in these totals. In modern times, in practice the Grand Cross is awarded only to foreign heads of state.

The first person to be awarded the Grand Cross of the Order of the Redeemer was King Ludwig I of Bavaria, the father of King Otto, in 1833. Other distinguished recipients included Andreas Miaoulis in 1835, Baron Guenther Heinrich von Berg on 21 February 1837 Petrobey Mavromichalis, Alexandros Mavrokordatos and Lazaros Kountouriotis in 1836, Andreas Zaimis, Theodoros Kolokotronis and Georgios Kountouriotis in 1837, and Konstantinos Kanaris in 1864.

== Insignia ==
The design of the various insignia has changed several times since the Order was established, with the most notable alteration being the removal of the crown during periods of republican rule. The current form of the insignia is defined by Presidential Decree 849/1975 (ΦΕΚ 273 Α΄/4-12-1975).

The original decree of 1833 described the badge of the Order as consisting of a white enamelled Maltese cross (silver for the Silver Cross, gold for the higher grades), surmounted by a crown, set on a green enamelled wreath, one half of which is an oak branch and the other half a laurel branch. The obverse featured a white cross on a blue background (the coat of arms of Greece) with Otto's Bavarian arms in an inescutcheon in the centre, surrounded by this inscription on an outer ring: Η ΔΕΞΙΑ ΣΟΥ ΧΕΙΡ, ΚΥΡΙΕ, ΔΕΔΟΞΑΣΤΑΙ ΕΝ ΙΣΧΥΙ ("Thy right hand, O Lord, is become glorious in power", Exodus, 15:6). The reverse featured a portrait of Otto with the circular inscription: ΟΘΩΝ, ΒΑΣΙΛΕΥΣ ΤΗΣ ΕΛΛΑΔΟΣ ("Otto, King of Greece").

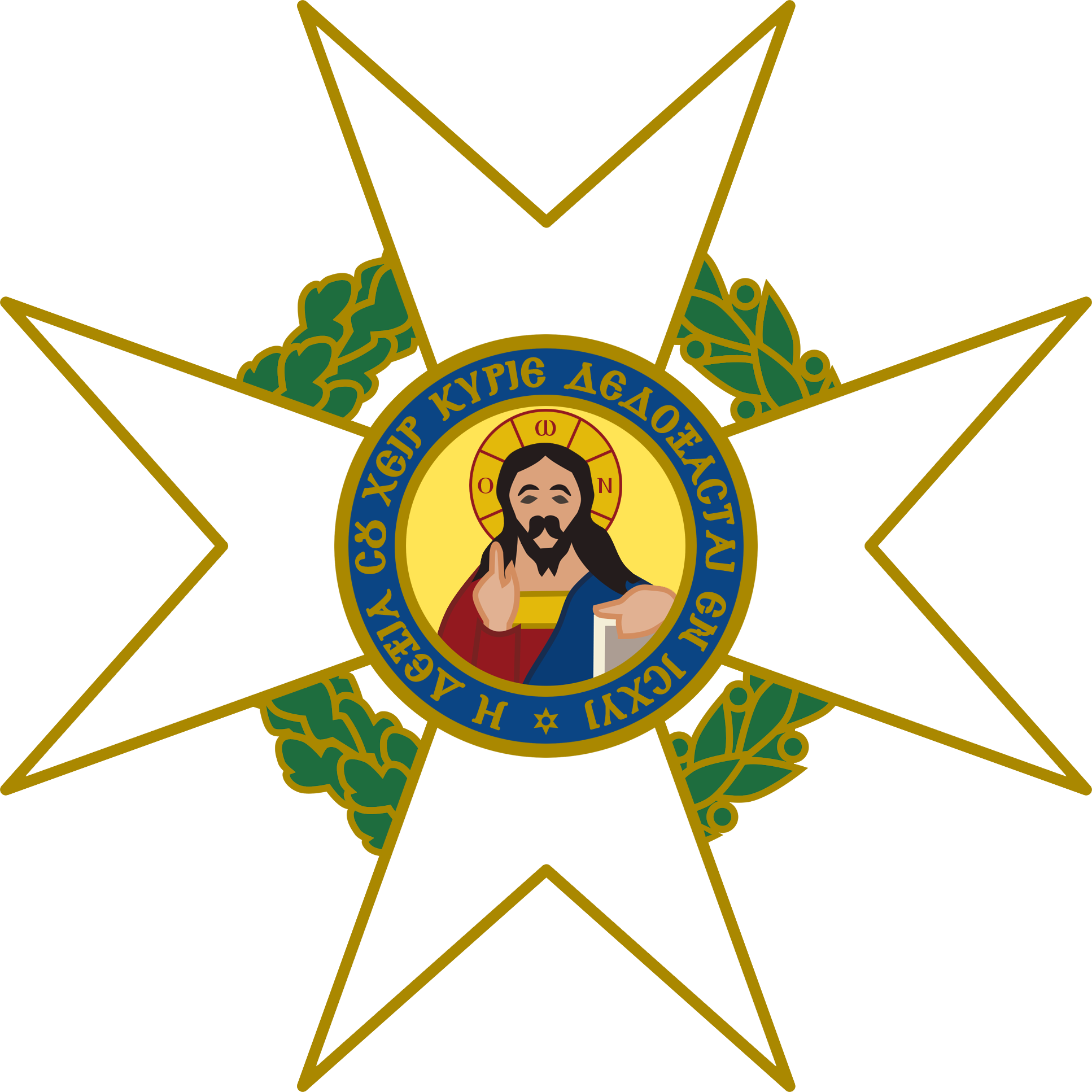
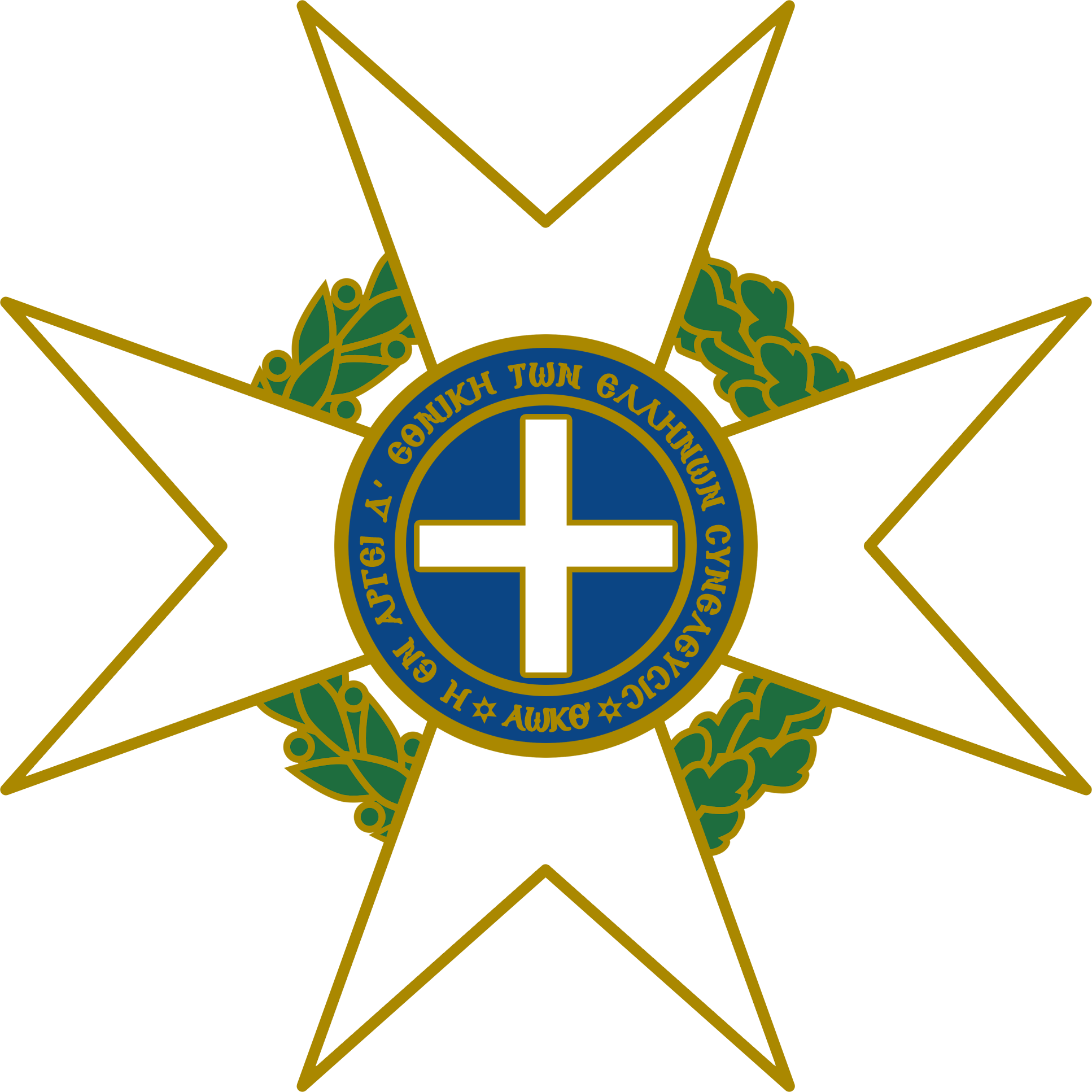
Badge of the Order since 1863, obverse on the left and reverse on the right. Under the monarchy, a royal crown surmounted the cross.

After Otto's deposition in 1863, his portrait was removed and substituted by an icon of Jesus, the Redeemer of Orthodox Christian soteriology. This resulted in the wearing of this side as the obverse, with the national coat of arms (purged of the Bavarian escutcheon) relegated to the reverse, and the inscriptions correspondingly changed: the obverse's inscription remained in place, and the reverse came to feature a new inscription: Η ΕΝ ΑΡΓΕΙ Δ´ ΕΘΝΙΚΗ ΤΩΝ ΕΛΛΗΝΩΝ ΣΥΝΕΛΕΥΣΙΣ - 1829 ("The IV National Assembly of the Hellenes at Argos – 1829").

The star of the Order is an eight-pointed faceted silver star with the same central disc as on the badge of the Order. At first the stars were embroidered, but eventually, they were made of solid silver, a practice that continues to this day.

The ribbon of the Order is light blue, edged with white, reflecting the national colours of Greece.

== Recipients ==
- Prince Aage, Count of Rosenborg
- Abbas II of Egypt
- Prince Adalbert of Bavaria (1828–1875)
- Prince Adalbert of Prussia (1811–1873)
- Alois Lexa von Aehrenthal
- Prince Aimone, Duke of Aosta
- Akihito
- Prince Albert of Prussia (1809–1872)
- Archduke Albrecht, Duke of Teschen
- Alexander I of Serbia
- Alexander I of Yugoslavia
- Alexander II of Russia
- Alexander III of Russia
- Alexander Frederick, Landgrave of Hesse
- Alexander of Battenberg
- Alexander of Greece
- Prince Alexander of Hesse and by Rhine
- Grand Duke Alexander Mikhailovich of Russia
- Princess Alexia of Greece and Denmark
- Alfred, 2nd Prince of Montenuovo
- Amha Selassie
- Gyula Andrássy
- Prince Andrew of Greece and Denmark
- Queen Anne-Marie of Greece
- Prince Arthur, Duke of Connaught and Strathearn
- Prince Arthur of Connaught
- Asa Jennings
- Prince Axel of Denmark
- Beatrix of the Netherlands
- Maximilian de Beauharnais, 3rd Duke of Leuchtenberg
- Prince Bernhard of Lippe-Biesterfeld
- Friedrich von Beck-Rzikowsky
- Prince Oscar Bernadotte
- Friedrich Ferdinand von Beust
- Bhumibol Adulyadej
- Herbert von Bismarck
- Otto von Bismarck
- Walther Bronsart von Schellendorff
- Bernhard von Bülow
- Carl XVI Gustaf
- Prince Carl, Duke of Västergötland
- Carol I of Romania
- Charles XV
- Charles Augustus, Hereditary Grand Duke of Saxe-Weimar-Eisenach (1844–1894)
- Prince Charles, Count of Flanders
- Prince Charles of Prussia
- Chiang Kai-shek
- Christian IX of Denmark
- Christian X of Denmark
- Richard Church (general)
- Constantine I of Greece
- Prince Constantine Alexios of Greece and Denmark
- Constantine II of Greece
- Gerasimos Contomichalos
- Spyromilios
- John Cowans
- Maximilian Daublebsky von Sterneck
- Adolf von Deines
- Jules de Trooz
- Grand Duke Dmitry Konstantinovich of Russia
- Prince Eduard of Saxe-Altenburg
- Edward VII of the United Kingdom
- Alfred Mordaunt Egerton
- Dwight D. Eisenhower
- Prince Eitel Friedrich of Prussia
- Elizabeth II of the United Kingdom
- Archduke Ernest of Austria
- Ernest Augustus, Duke of Brunswick
- Ernest Louis, Grand Duke of Hesse
- Gaston Errembault de Dudzeele
- Prince Eugen, Duke of Närke
- Theoklitos Farmakidis
- Farouk of Egypt
- Felipe VI
- Ferdinand I of Romania
- Archduke Franz Karl of Austria
- Franz Joseph II, Prince of Liechtenstein
- Frederik VIII of Denmark
- Frederik IX of Denmark
- Frederick Augustus III of Saxony
- Prince Frederick Charles of Hesse
- Frederick Francis II, Grand Duke of Mecklenburg-Schwerin
- Frederick Francis III, Grand Duke of Mecklenburg-Schwerin
- Frederick I, Duke of Anhalt
- Frederick I, Grand Duke of Baden
- Frederick III, German Emperor
- Prince Frederick of Hohenzollern-Sigmaringen
- Frederick William III, Landgrave of Hesse
- Frederick William IV of Prussia
- Frederick William, Grand Duke of Mecklenburg-Strelitz
- Friedrich II, Duke of Anhalt
- Friedrich Ferdinand, Duke of Schleswig-Holstein
- Prince Friedrich Karl of Prussia
- Prince Friedrich Leopold of Prussia
- Fuad I of Egypt
- Georg, Crown Prince of Saxony
- George I of Greece
- George II of Greece
- George V
- Boutros Ghali
- Agenor Maria Gołuchowski
- Gustaf V
- Gustaf VI Adolf
- Prince Gustav of Denmark
- Gustav, Prince of Vasa
- Haakon VII of Norway
- Haile Selassie
- Hamad bin Khalifa Al Thani
- Harald V of Norway
- Prince Harald of Denmark
- Hassan II of Morocco
- Henri, Grand Duke of Luxembourg
- Prince Henry of Prussia (1862–1929)
- Duke Henry of Mecklenburg-Schwerin
- Hirohito
- Miklós Horthy
- Dietrich von Hülsen-Haeseler
- Hussein Kamel of Egypt
- Idris of Libya
- Sergěj Ingr (Grand Commander, 1932)
- Isabella II of Spain
- Isma'il Pasha of Egypt
- Jean, Grand Duke of Luxembourg
- Archduke John of Austria
- Prince Johann of Schleswig-Holstein-Sonderburg-Glücksburg
- Archduke Johann Salvator of Austria
- Duke John Albert of Mecklenburg
- Joseph, Duke of Saxe-Altenburg
- Infante Juan, Count of Barcelona
- Juan Carlos I
- Juliana of the Netherlands
- Theophilos Kairis
- Konstantinos Kanaris
- Miltiadis Kanaris
- Ilias Kanellopoulos
- Karl Anton, Prince of Hohenzollern
- Archduke Karl Ludwig of Austria
- Prince Karl Theodor of Bavaria
- Gustav von Kessel
- Grand Duke Kirill Vladimirovich of Russia
- Knud, Hereditary Prince of Denmark
- Empress Kōjun
- Theodoros Kolokotronis
- Grand Duke Konstantin Konstantinovich of Russia
- Konstantin of Hohenlohe-Schillingsfürst
- Georgios Kountouriotis
- Lazaros Kountouriotis
- Auguste, Baron Lambermont
- Leopold I of Belgium
- Leopold II of Belgium
- Leopold III of Belgium
- Prince Leopold, Duke of Albany
- Anastasios Londos
- Louis IV, Grand Duke of Hesse
- Prince Louis of Battenberg
- A. Maurice Low
- Ludwig I of Bavaria
- Archduke Ludwig Viktor of Austria
- Luís I of Portugal
- Luitpold, Prince Regent of Bavaria
- Emmanuel Macron
- Empress Masako
- Margrethe II of Denmark
- Sergio Mattarella
- Alexandros Mavrokordatos
- Petrobey Mavromichalis
- Maximilian I of Mexico
- Duke Maximilian Joseph in Bavaria
- Emperor Meiji
- Ioannis Metaxas
- Andreas Miaoulis
- Grand Duke Michael Alexandrovich of Russia
- Prince Michael of Greece and Denmark
- Michael I of Romania
- Mihailo Obrenović, Prince of Serbia
- Milan I of Serbia
- Miloš Obrenović, Prince of Serbia
- Zygmunt Mineyko
- Konstantinos Minas
- Mohammad Reza Pahlavi
- Prince Moritz of Saxe-Altenburg
- August Myhrberg
- Napoleon III
- Nicholas I of Montenegro
- Nicholas II of Russia
- Grand Duke Nicholas Mikhailovich of Russia
- Grand Duke Nicholas Nikolaevich of Russia (1831–1891)
- Grand Duke Nicholas Nikolaevich of Russia (1856–1929)
- Prince Nikolaos of Greece and Denmark
- Nikos Christodoulides
- Olav V of Norway
- Olga Constantinovna of Russia
- Oscar II
- Otto of Bavaria
- Otto of Greece
- Paul of Greece
- Prince Paul of Yugoslavia
- Pavlos, Crown Prince of Greece
- Peter II of Yugoslavia
- Philippe of Belgium
- Queen Mathilde of Belgium
- Pedro II of Brazil
- Georgios Pentzikis
- Duke Peter of Oldenburg
- Nicolae Petrescu-Comnen
- Prince Philip, Duke of Edinburgh
- Prince Philippos of Greece and Denmark
- Hans von Plessen
- François Pouqueville
- Prince Frederick William of Hesse-Kassel
- Patrick Quinn (Metropolitan Police officer)
- Joseph Radetzky von Radetz
- Archduke Rainer Ferdinand of Austria
- Rudolf, Crown Prince of Austria
- Spyridon Samaras
- Gustav von Senden-Bibran
- Grand Duke Sergei Alexandrovich of Russia
- Simeon Saxe-Coburg-Gotha
- Konstantinos Smolenskis
- Leonidas Smolents
- Queen Sofía of Spain
- Dionysios Solomos
- Queen Sonja of Norway
- Hermann von Spaun
- Stepa Stepanović
- Tomáš Garrigue Masaryk
- Harold Stevens (broadcaster)
- Emperor Taishō
- Ludwig Freiherr von und zu der Tann-Rathsamhausen
- Georgios Theocharis
- Patriarch Theophilos III of Jerusalem
- Alfred von Tirpitz
- Umberto II of Italy
- Prince Valdemar of Denmark
- Prince Viggo, Count of Rosenborg
- Étienne de Villaret
- Vittorio Emanuele, Prince of Naples
- Grand Duke Vladimir Alexandrovich of Russia
- John Weston (pioneer aviator and motor caravanner)
- Wilhelm II, German Emperor
- Wilhelm, German Crown Prince
- Wilhelmina of the Netherlands
- Willem-Alexander of the Netherlands
- Queen Máxima of the Netherlands
- William I, German Emperor
- William, Prince of Hohenzollern
- Arthur Winnington-Ingram
- Sergei Witte
- Duke Eugen of Württemberg (1846–1877)
- Basil Zaharoff
- Todor Zhivkov
- Zog I of Albania
- August zu Eulenburg
- Emmanouil Zymvrakakis
- Emir Abdelkader (1808-1883)
- Joice NanKivell Loch
- George Vella
- Alexakis Vlachopoulos
- Stanley Casson

Greek orders timeline
Orders by precedence	1832–1909	1910s	1920s		1930s	1940s	1950s	1960s	1970–present	
Order of the Redeemer	.								Rep.	
Order of Honour										Rep.
Order of Saints George and Constantine					.		.		.	Dynastic
Order of Saints Olga and Sophia					.		.		.	Dynastic
Order of George I		.			.		.		.	Dynastic
Order of the Phoenix					.					Rep.
Order of Beneficence							.			Rep.
Years										
Regime	Monarchy			Republic	Mon.	Rep.	Monarchy		Rep.	
	1832–1909	1910s	1920s		1930s	1940s	1950s	1960s	1970–present	
