= Mechanized Cavalry Regiment =

Mechanized Cavalry Regiment Μηχανοκίνητο Σύνταγμα Ιππικού
- Active: 1937–1941
- Country: Kingdom of Greece
- Branch: Hellenic Army
- Type: Mechanized infantry
- Part of: Cavalry Division (1937–1940), 8th Infantry Division (1940–1941)
- Engagements: Greco-Italian War

The Mechanized Cavalry Regiment (Greek: Μηχανοκίνητο Σύνταγμα Ιππικού) was a mechanized infantry unit of the Hellenic Army, created in 1937 at Thessaloniki as part of the Cavalry Division. It fought in the Greco-Italian War of 1940–41, before being amalgamated into the 19th Mechanized Division in March 1941.

== Background and establishment ==
Greece's first contact with armoured warfare was in 1925, when the French military mission to Greece (1925–32) introduced up-to-date French tactical manuals. The creation of a Tank Regiment was ordered in 1926, but the effort was abandoned a year later due to financial constraints. In 1931, Greece acquired its first tanks—two Vickers 6-Ton light tanks, one each of Type A and Type B, and two Carden Loyd tankettes. Initially used for training, they were formed into a tank battalion in 1935, with the expectation that they would be complemented with 14 light tanks ordered in Britain and France, at a cost of 40 million Greek drachmas. In the event, these were never delivered due to the priority given by Britain and France to their own rearmament and the outbreak of World War II.

In 1937, in an apparent imitation of the French Division Légère de Cavalerie model, the Mechanized Cavalry Regiment was formed at Thessaloniki, as part of the Hellenic Army's single Cavalry Division. Its structure was as follows:

- Command and regimental staff group, including one communications and one engineer group
- 1st Battalion Command (Διοίκηση Ι Επιλαρχίας)
- 2nd Battalion Command (Διοίκηση ΙΙ Επιλαρχίας)
- Light Company (Ελαφρά Ίλη)
  - 1 Bicycle and Tricycle Squad (Ουλαμός Δικύκλων και Τρικύκλων)
  - 3 Reconnaissance Squads (Ουλαμοί Αναγνωρίσεως) on cars
- 3 Battle Companies (Ίλες Μάχης), each comprising 120 men armed with 6.5 mm Mannlicher–Schönauer carbines, eight VB rifle grenade launchers on Lebel rifles, and twelve 6.5 mm Hotchkiss machine guns, divided into
  - 2 Half-Companies (Ημιλαρχίες) of
    - 2 Lorry-Borne Squads (Μεταφερόμενοι Ουλαμοί)
- 1 Machine Gun Company (Ίλη Πολυβόλων) with twelve 7.92 mm Hotchkiss machine guns
- 1 Mortar Company (Ίλη Όλμων) with four 81 mm mortars
- unit transports
- 2 mobile repair workshops

In total, the regiment comprised c. 165 trucks (44 each of the Mercedes-Benz W 152 4x4 cars and Mercedes-Benz LG 2500 6x6 trucks, and 75 other 2.5-ton trucks, probably mostly Fiats), as well as motorcycles and other vehicles, but no armoured cars or tanks. The battalion commands were designed to provide tactical flexibility, by detaching squads from the support companies and attaching them as needed to the Battle Companies.

== Combat history ==
With the Italian invasion of Greece on 28 October 1940, the regiment, under Cavalry Lt. Colonel Epameinondas Asimakopoulos, mobilized in the Lebet army camp in Thessaloniki and joined the rest of the Cavalry Division (Maj. General Georgios Stanotas) at Langadas. On 29 October, the Light Company, along with other units of the Cavalry Division, were detached to the Cavalry Brigade also being formed at Langadas. The rest of the regiment followed the Cavalry Division to Kalambaka, where it arrived on 31 October. During this move, the inexperience of the drivers led to several accidents, which led to dozens of casualties in dead and wounded.

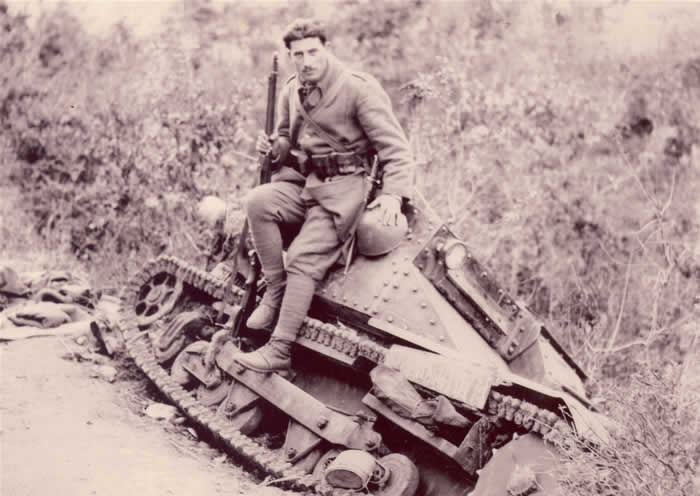
A Greek soldier sitting on a captured Italian L3/33 tankette

Along with the rest of the Cavalry Division, the regiment participated in the final stages of the Battle of Pindus against the elite Italian 3rd Alpine Division Julia. The first elements of the regiment arrived at Metsovo, the target of the Julia Division's advance, on 3 November. On 7 November the Mechanized Regiment was detached from the Cavalry Division and placed under the command of the 8th Infantry Division (Maj. General Charalambos Katsimitros) further west. On 11 November, the detached Light Company, which along with the Cavalry Brigade had also participated in the fight against the Julia Division Until 10 November, was reincorporated into the Mechanized Regiment.

On 15 November an Anti-Tank Rifle Squad (Ουλαμός Αντιαρματικών Τυφεκίων), equipped with twenty Boys anti-tank rifles was formed, followed a month later by a Tank Company (Ίλη Αρμάτων) comprising 35 L3/35 tankettes captured from the Italians in the Battle of Elaia–Kalamas. To support the tanks in close combat, a lorry-borne squad of 60 men with two Mercedes-Benz W 152, four Mercedes-Benz LG 2500, and a motorcycle was attached to the Tank Company.

The regiment participated in the Greek offensive operations towards Tepelenë, during which the captured Italian tanks—affectionately nicknamed "little bouzoukis" by the Greek soldiers— were employed as mobile fire bases to cover and support the Battle Companies. Finally, on 23 March 1941, the regiment was moved to Katerini to provide the fighting core of the newly formed 19th Mechanized Division. During the 600 km march, two tanks were lost—one to mechanical failure, and one by falling into a ravine. Despite the harsh terrain and constant use, the Italian tankettes proved generally reliable, but the lack of spare parts soon became an acute problem and reduced their combat-worthiness.

== Sources ==
- Christodoulou, Dimitrios (2012). "Οι ελληνικές μηχανοκίνητες δυνάμεις κατά τον ελληνοϊταλικό και ελληνογερμανικό πόλεμο (1940-41), Μέρος 1ο". Ιππικό – Τεθωρακισμένα, No. 74 (January–March 2012) [The Greek Mechanized Forces During the Greek–Italian and Greek–German War (1940-41), Part 1]. Cavalry–Armour Retired Officers Union. pp. 21–24.
- Hellenic Army General Staff, Training Directorate/3a (March 1995). Ιστορία Ιππικού - Τεθωρακισμένων [History of the Cavalry–Armour Arm] (PDF). Athens: Hellenic Army Printing Office.
