= Makris =

Makris (Greek: Μακρής) is a surname of Greek origin which means long. The female equivalent is Makri (Greek: Μακρή). The name "Makris" may refer to one of the following people:

- Andreas Makris (1930–2005), Greek-American composer
- Antonis Makris (born 1981), Cypriot footballer
- Constantine Makris, Greek-American cinematographer, television director and television producer
- Cynthia Makris (born 1956), American soprano opera singer
- Dimitrios Makris (c.1772-1841), Greek military commander and fighter of the 1821 revolution
- Dimitrios Makris (politician) (1910–1982), former Interior Minister of Greece
- Dionysis Makris (born 1982), Greek singer
- George Makris (1920–2005), American college football coach
- Georgios Makris (born 1984), Greek footballer
- Memos Makris (1913–1993), Greek sculptor
- Nikolaos Makris (1829–1911), Greek soldier and politician
- Orestis Makris (1898–1975), Greek actor and tenor
- Thomas Makris (born 1978), Greek footballer
- Vassilis Makris (born 1958), Greek photographer

It may also refer to:

- Makri, an island in western Greece
- Makris, an old name for the island of Ikaria, eastern Greece
- Makri, Evros, a village in northern Greece
- Nea Makri, a town in Attica, Greece

== See also ==
- Kitsos Makris Folklore Museum
- Mackris
