= Cavalry Division (Greece) =

Cavalry division of the Hellenic Army

Cavalry Division Μεραρχία Ιππικού
- Active: 1921–1929; 1935–1941
- Country: Greece
- Branch: Hellenic Army
- Type: Cavalry
- Part of: Army of Asia Minor (1922), Army of the Evros (1922–23), Western Macedonia Army Section (1940–41)
- Engagements: Asia Minor Campaign, Greco-Italian War, Battle of Greece

The Cavalry Division (Greek: Μεραρχία Ιππικού, ΜΙ) was the only cavalry division of the Hellenic Army, active from 1921 to 1929 and 1935–1941.

== Background ==
Historically, since its establishment after the Greek War of Independence, the Hellenic Army had had a small cavalry force, which only gradually rose to three regiments in 1885. The first larger formation was established in February 1912, as part of the reforms introduced by a French military mission in the form of the Cavalry Brigade, comprising the 1st and 3rd Cavalry Regiments. The Cavalry Brigade took part in the early stages of the First Balkan War, but was disbanded in November 1912, re-established in March 1913 and took part in the Second Balkan War.

After the end of the Balkan Wars, the new peacetime organization of the Hellenic Army included the creation of a two-brigade Cavalry Division, with headquarters at Thessaloniki, but this was left incomplete, as the second brigade was never constituted. After Greece's entry into World War I, in September 1917 the establishment of a three-regiment Cavalry Division was envisaged, but in the event no major cavalry formation was established, and even the existing 1st Cavalry Brigade was disbanded; the Greek cavalry fought in the Macedonian Front only with the 1st and 3rd Cavalry Regiments as well as half-companies attached to the infantry divisions.

== Asia Minor Campaign and aftermath ==
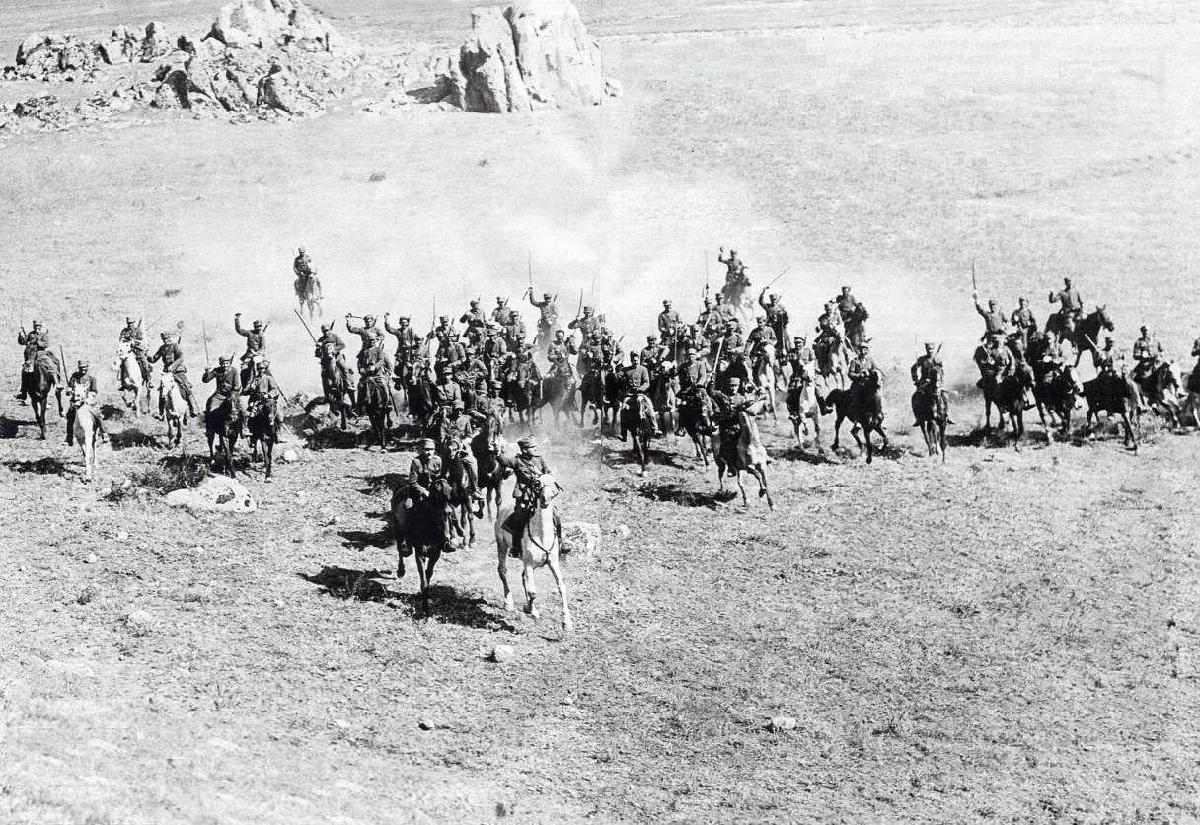
Greek cavalry in Asia Minor

This remained the case during the early stages of the Asia Minor Campaign as well. The Cavalry Brigade was re-established in June 1920, and participated in the major operations of the next two years. Finally, on 16 November 1921, the Cavalry Division was constituted as part of the Army of Asia Minor, with three cavalry regiments, under Major General Andreas Kallinskis-Roïdis. A fourth regiment was added in June 1922, but due to lack of horses its men fought on foot.

At the time of the Turkish Great Offensive and the breakthrough of the Greek front in August 1922, the Cavalry Division's force was dispersed on various missions. With the Turkish cavalry wreaking havoc in the Greek army's rear areas, the units of the Cavalry Division fought piecemeal actions against the Turkish cavalry's attempts to cut off Greek communication and supply lines and in support of the embattled and retreating infantry divisions. The most notable event during the retreat was the cover provided to the remnants of the Southern Group of the Greek army at the Battle of Salihli, which prevented their encirclement and capture. On 29 August, the Division received orders to embark at Çeşme for Piraeus. This was done by 1 September, with 3rd Regiment covering the retreat and embarking in turn on 2 September.

Having evacuated relatively intact and in good order, the Cavalry Division was soon reconstituted as a fighting force with three and later four regiments. Under the command of Colonel Georgios Skandalis, it became part of the Army of the Evros during the standoff with Turkey before the signing of the Treaty of Lausanne.

The Cavalry Division was retained in the peacetime establishment after the demobilization of 1923. The Army Regulations of 1926 created a 2nd Cavalry Division, with two regiments for each division, but in 1929 both divisions were downgraded to brigades.

== Re-establishment and World War II ==
The Cavalry Division was re-established on 13 April 1935, based at Athens. It comprised two brigades, one at Athens and one at Thessaloniki, as well as the newly formed 5th Cavalry Regiment, also at Athens. The Cavalry Division was not only a combat formation, but also gathered the administration of all cavalry-related establishments and units under its roof, replacing the Cavalry Inspectorate, which was abolished.

In 1937, the headquarters of the division was moved to Thessaloniki. In the same year, its strength was reduced to three cavalry regiments, while a Mechanized Cavalry Regiment was added to its strength. In wartime, plans called for the creation of an independent Cavalry Brigade from among the division's personnel.

Upon the outbreak of the Greco-Italian War on 28 October 1940, both the Cavalry Division, under Major General Georgios Stanotas, and the Cavalry Brigade, under Colonel Sokratis Dimaratos, mobilized. The Cavalry Brigade was quickly made independent of its parent, operating as a mixed cavalry-infantry formation until its units were reincorporated into the Cavalry Division on 1 January 1941. The detachment of the Cavalry Brigade left the Cavalry Division with only the 3rd Cavalry Regiment and the Mechanized Cavalry Regiment and its divisional artillery and support units, but it was reinforced with the 4th Infantry Regiment and a battalion of 7th Infantry Regiment.

The division was placed under the direct command of the Greek high command and sent to cover the critical road connecting Ioannina with Kalambaka over the Pindus Mountains. As a result, the division established itself at Metsovo, from where it played a central role in the Battle of Pindus against the elite Italian 3rd Alpine Division "Julia". The Italian advance along the Pindus was stopped and turned back with high casualties. On 13 November, the Cavalry Division reached Konitsa, which it captured on the 16th. The division then participated in the Greek thrust into Italian-occupied Albania, operating at the junction between I Army Corps and II Army Corps. The division participated in the capture of Leskovik and Përmet, before being gradually replaced between 11 and 28 December by 1st Infantry Division.

Withdrawing to the Konitsa area, the division remained in reserve until 17 February, before moving to northeast of Korçë. From 24 March, the division took up defensive positions south of Lake Ohrid, but with the German invasion of Greece looming, on 7 April it was redeployed west of Florina, with the aim of covering the flanks of the Western Macedonia Army Section (TSDM) and the rest of the Greek army in Albania, and establishing a connection with the British W Force. For this purpose, the division was reinforced with three Reconnaissance Groups (13th, 16th, 21st) and the 21st Infantry Brigade.

First contact with the invading German forces of the XXXX Panzer Corps occurred on 10 April. The Germans captured Florina on the same day, but the Cavalry Division beat back German attempts to capture the Pisoderi Pass. However, after fierce fighting, the Germans broke through the British and Greek forces defending the Kleidi pass further east on 12 April. The German breakthrough forced W Force to retreat southeast, breaking off contact with the Cavalry Division, which in turn extended its right flank to establish contact with the 20th Infantry Division, tasked with covering the Kleisoura Pass. The Greek high command then issued orders for TSDM to withdraw behind the Aliakmon River. The Cavalry Division conducted a fighting retreat, holding the Agia Foteini Pass for several hours on 15 April, but failing to prevent the fall of Kastoria to the Germans on the evening of the same day. As the German advance further west cut off the roads leading into Thessaly, the Cavalry Division continued its retreat west to the Pindus Mountains until 20 April, when the commander of the Greek army in Epirus, Lieutenant General Georgios Tsolakoglou, began armistice negotiations with the Germans. The Cavalry Division was disbanded with the surrender of the Greek forces in Epirus on 23 April.

== Sources ==
- Hellenic Army General Staff, Training Directorate/3a (March 1995). Ιστορία Ιππικού - Τεθωρακισμένων [History of the Cavalry–Armour Arm] (PDF). Athens: Hellenic Army Printing Office.
- Η ιστορία της οργάνωσης του Ελληνικού Στρατού, 1821–1954 [The history of the organization of the Hellenic Army, 1821–1954] (in Greek). Athens: Hellenic Army History Directorate. 2005. ISBN 960-7897-45-5.
