= Gerodimos Stathas =

Gerodimos Stathas Γεροδήμος Σταθάς
- Born: 1712; Dounista, Ottoman Empire (now Stathas, Greece)
- Died: 1800
- Relatives: Giannis Stathas (son)

Gerodimos Stathas (Greek: Γεροδήμος Σταθάς; 1712–1800) was a Greek armatolos during the pre-Greek Revolution era in Greece. His given name was Dimosthenis, shortened to Dimos, but due to his age and as a title of respect, he was given the prefix Geros ("old man"). He was the founder of the family of the Stathaioi of the Valtos Region. His son, Giannis Stathas went on to lead major revolts against the Ottoman Empire. He is also considered to be the grandfather of Georgios Karaiskakis.

In 1766, Gerodimos took up arms against the Ottoman Empire following a promise from Georgios Papazolis that the Russian Empire would provide help to a Greek revolution. The Orlov Revolt finally ended in 1774 with the total defeat of the Greek rebels. The Russians had signed a peace treaty, effectively ending the Russo-Turkish War and leaving the Greeks without any support. Gerodimos successfully defended against the Turkish reprisals that followed.

The village of Stathas in Valtos Province is named after him.
