= Battle of Hill 731 =

1941 World War II battle in southern Albania

Coordinates: 40°26′12.0″N 20°05′06.0″E

- Part of the Italian spring offensive, during the Greco-Italian War
- The Italian Spring Offensive (red arrows)
Date	9–24 March 1941 (2 weeks and 1 day)
Location	Hill 731, Mount Trebeshinë, Albania
Result	Greek victory

Belligerents
Greece	Italy

Commanders and leaders
(Kingdom of Greece) Maj-Gen. Georgios Bakos (II Corps) (Kingdom of Greece) Maj-Gen. Vasileios Vrachnos (1st Division) (Kingdom of Greece) Col. Nikolaos Georgoulas (5th Regiment) (Kingdom of Greece) Major Dimitrios Kaslas (731 Battalion)	(Kingdom of Italy) Gen. Gastone Gambara (VIII Corps) (Kingdom of Italy) Gen-Div. Alberto D'Aponte (Puglie Division) (Kingdom of Italy) Brig-Gen. Angelico Carta (Siena Division) (Kingdom of Italy) Brig-Gen Matteo Negro (Bari Division)

Strength
1 battalion	2 infantry divisions 1 tank regiment

Casualties and losses
Roughly 1,000	Roughly 8,000

View of Hill 731 after the battle.

The Battle of Hill (Height) 731 (Greek: Μάχη του Υψώματος 731; Italian: Battaglia di Quota 731), was a fierce battle fought during World War II in southern Albania, part of the Greco-Italian War. It began in the early morning of 9 March 1941, when the Kingdom of Italy launched an assault (Operation Primavera) against Greece, aimed at capturing the critical mountain pass leading into the Kalpaki valley.

Hill 731, strategically located 20 km north of Klisura (Këlcyrë) at the feet of Mount Trebeshinë, stood at the heart of the Greek defensive line. Despite being repeatedly and heavily attacked by superior Italian forces for over two weeks, Hill 731 was not captured, contributing to the failure of the Primavera offensive and the repulsion of Italians.

== Background ==
By the end of 1940, the Greek command decided to halt large-scale offensive operations on the Albanian front, authorizing only local offensive operations for improving Greek lines until the weather improved. In effect, during the first months of 1941, the fighting had turned to a stalemate. In the spring of 1941, the Italian leadership desired to achieve a success against the Greek army before the impending German intervention. The plan, devised by General Ugo Cavallero, envisioned a large-scale attack on a narrow, 32 km front in the centre of the Greek positions. The aim of the Italian attack was to break through the Greek lines, recapture Klisura, and advance towards Leskovik and Ioannina. Key to the Italian effort was a hill known as 731, which stood at the center of the planned attack.

The attack would be carried out by the VIII Army Corps (59th Cagliari, 38th Puglie, and 24th Pinerolo Divisions) and two elite Blackshirt battalions of the 26th Legion, XXV Army Corps' 2nd Sforzesca Division, the 47th Bari, 51st Siena, and 7th Lupi di Toscana Divisions as a second echelon, and the Centauro and Piemonte Divisions as general reserves.

The Greek units opposite them were II Corps (17th, 5th, 1st, 15th, and 11th Divisions) which had been fighting from the beginning of the war, with three regiments as reserve, and able to be reinforced by the 4th Division. During the preceding months and in anticipation of an attack, the Greek troops had been ordered to dig entrenchments to provide cover. The Italian Division to assault Hill 731 was Puglie. Hill 731 was defended by the 2nd Battalion of the Greek 5th Infantry Regiment (ΙΙ/5) of the 1st Division, who were ordered to hold their positions at all costs. The ΙΙ/5 Battalion was commanded by Major Dimitrios Kaslas and the majority of its soldiers hailed from the towns of Trikala and Karditsa.

The commander of the Greek II Corps Maj. Gen. Georgios Bakos had been appointed a mere four days prior to the Italian offensive. In a conference held at Athens on 5 March, the then commander Lt. Gen. Dimitrios Papadopoulos, along with two other generals of the I Corps, objected to the presence in Greece of a British expeditionary force, which would have been inadequate to defend Greece against the Germans but sufficient to provide them with a casus belli. Their opposition led to their dismissal on the next day and their retirement on the day after that.

== The battle ==
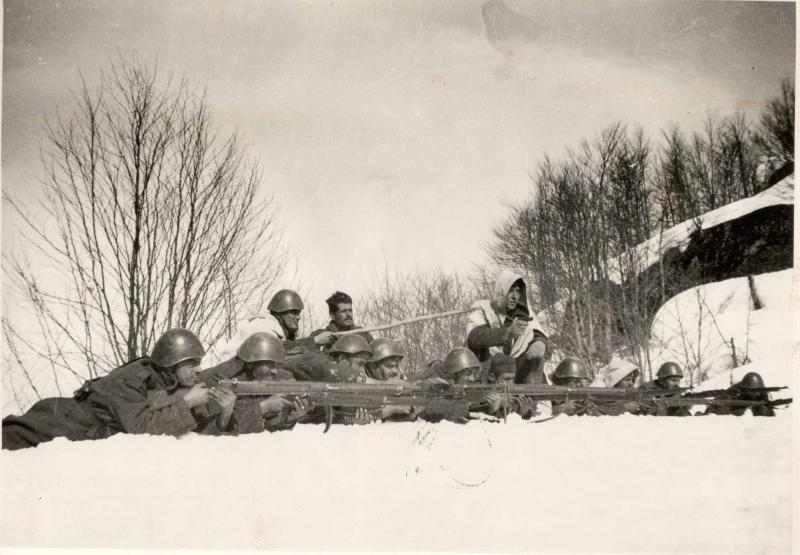
Greek troops during the Italian spring offensive

The Italian attack, observed by Italian dictator Benito Mussolini in person, was launched on 9 March with a heavy artillery barrage and air bombardment; on the main sector, held by the Greek 1st Division, over 100,000 shells were dropped on a 6 km front. Despite repeated assaults and heavy shelling that dug up the soil, the defenders of Hill 731 held during 9–15 March. With the support of the Greek artillery, they managed to take advantage of the terrain and launch counterattacks. Greek riflemen charged at the oncoming Italians with fixed bayonets, under the cover of dense smoke. Dimitrios Kaslas, after the bombardment gave an order for every soldier to stand his ground no matter what, and promised to personally shoot and kill anyone trying to retreat.

A flanking manoeuvre by the Blackshirts of the 26th Legion on 11 March ended in Italian defeat. In the afternoon of the 12 March, the Greeks reinforced the defending units with the entire 19th Regiment of the 4th Division; Hill 731 was now defended by the III/19 Battalion under the command of Captain Panagiotis Koutridis. On the night of 12 March, the Italians withdrew the exhausted Puglie Division and replaced it with the Bari Division. The Italian offensive halted between 16–18 March, allowing the Greeks to bring reserves forward and begin a gradual reshuffle of their line, relieving the 1st Division with the 17th. The Italian offensive resumed on 19 March with another attack of the Siena Division on Hill 731 (the 18th thus far). Supported by four M13/40 tanks and an Arditi assault unit from the Siena Division, the Italians seized a portion of Hill 731 but were soon pushed back by a Greek counter-attack. Attacks, preceded by intense artillery bombardments, followed daily until 24 March, without achieving any result. Mussolini was forced to admit that the result of the Italian offensive was zero, and the Italian offensive was terminated on 24 March.

== Aftermath ==
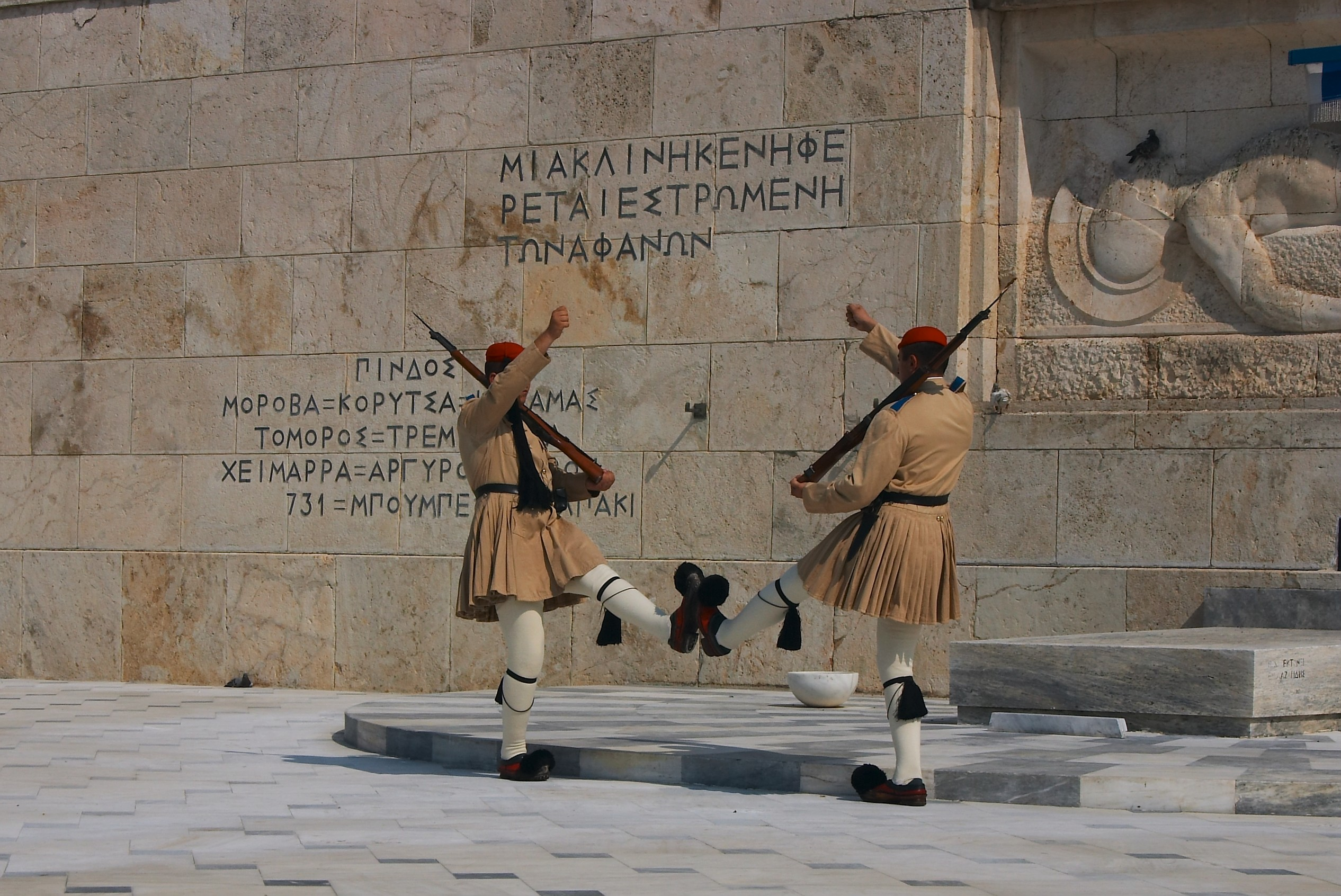
The Tomb of the Unknown Soldier in Athens. The inscription "731" can be seen in the last row of the stone carved text on the left.

The Battle of Hill 731 has been described as the Verdun of the Greco-Italian War, whereas others referred to it as the new Thermopylae. It was a bloody struggle, with soldiers often engaging in close quarters combat and fighting with whatever they had at hand. The ferocious ground and air bombardment transformed the hill's landscape, eliminating all trees and reducing its height by 2 meters: its present day altitude is 729 meters.

The Greek army defeated the Italian counter-attack of March 1941, inflicting heavy casualties. Shortly after, the German invasion of Greece through Bulgaria (Operation Marita) began on 6 April, creating a second front. Greece had received a small reinforcement from British forces based in Egypt, in anticipation of the German invasion. Greek forces were outnumbered and most troops were still at the Albanian front. The Bulgarian defensive line did not receive adequate reinforcements and was soon overrun. The Germans outflanked the Greek forces on the Albanian border, forcing their surrender and British Empire forces began a retreat. For several days Allied troops contained the German advance on the Thermopylae pass, allowing ships to be prepared to evacuate the British force. The Germans reached Athens on 27 April and completed the conquest of Greece with the capture of Crete a month later. As a result, Greece was occupied by the military forces of Germany, Italy and Bulgaria until late 1944.

== See also ==
- Capture of Klisura Pass
- Battle of Trebeshina
- Italian Spring Offensive
