= Stathas =

Stathas Σταθάς
- Community
- Location within Greece
- Coordinates: 39°00′N 21°16′E
- Country: Greece
- Administrative region: West Greece
- Regional unit: Aetolia-Acarnania
- Municipality: Amfilochia
- Municipal unit: Inachos

Population (2021)
  - Community: 248
- Time zone: UTC+2 (EET)
  - Summer (DST): UTC+3 (EEST)

Stathas (Greek: Σταθάς, before 1928: Δούνιστα - Dounista) is a small mountain village and a community in western Greece. It is part of the Inachos municipal unit, Aetolia-Acarnania. The community includes the villages Potamia and Pavliada. The altitude of the village is 640 meters above sea level. The nearest major cities are Agrinio, Amfilochia and Arta.

== History ==
The village Dounista was renamed "Stathas" in 1928 after the famous 18th century armatolos Gerodimos Stathas, who came from Dounista. Other famous rebels, during the Turkish occupation of Greece, from the same village are:

- Giannis Stathas (1758–1812)
- Andreas Iskos
- Ioannis Iskos
- Chronis Iskos
- Dimitris Iskos or Karaiskos (who, according to a rumor, was the father of Georgios Karaiskakis, the famous fighter for the Greek independence).

== Population ==
Year	Village population	Community population
1981	-	503
1991	151	-
2001	168	467
2011	85	322
2021	54	248

== See also ==
- List of settlements in Aetolia-Acarnania
