= Konstantinos Davakis =

Greek colonel

Konstantinos Davakis Κωνσταντίνος Δαβάκης
- Konstantinos Davakis in uniform.
- Born: c. 1897; Kechrianika, Laconia, Kingdom of Greece
- Died: 21 January 1943 (aged 45–46) in the Adriatic Sea off southern Albania
- Burial place: Athens, Greece
- Military career
- Allegiance: Kingdom of Greece
- Branch: Hellenic Army
- Service years: 1916–1943
- Rank: Colonel
- Unit: Pindus Detachment (1940)
- Conflicts: World War I: Macedonian front; Battle of Skra-di-Legen; Battle of Doiran; Greco-Turkish War (1919–1922); World War II: Greco-Italian War; Capture of Konitsa; Battle of Pindus (WIA)
- Awards: Order of the Redeemer; Order of George I Gold Cross of Valour; Medal of Military Merit; Croix de Guerre; Silver Medal of Sacrifice by the Athens Academy

Konstantinos Davakis (Greek: Κωνσταντίνος Δαβάκης; 1897 – 21 January 1943) was a Greek military officer in World War II. He organized the Greek defensive lines during the Battle of Pindus that led to Italian defeat in the first stage of the Greco-Italian War of 1940.

== Early life ==
He was born in the village of Kechrianika, Laconia in 1897. After graduating from the Hellenic Military Academy in 1916 as a Second lieutenant, he saw action in World War I, distinguishing himself in the battles of Skra-di-Legen and Doiran. After taking part in the Greco-Turkish War (1919–1922), Davakis wrote a number of works on military history and armoured warfare while also teaching at military academies.

== Greco-Italian War ==
Davakis was a colonel when Italy attacked Greece on 28 October 1940. As commander of the Pindus detachment (Απόσπασμα Πίνδου), he successfully repelled the Italian Julia Alpine Division's attack in late October 1940. He was seriously injured few days later, in November, just before the counter-attack of the Greek forced and was replaced by Ioannis Karavias.

Davakis' detachment, composed of two infantry battalions of the 51st Infantry Regiment, one cavalry troop and one artillery battery, was the first Greek unit that received the "blow" of the Italian invasion. Davakis' forces were overstretched, covering a 30 km front on mountainous terrain. His unit resisted the Julia Division's advance for two days, by which time sufficient reinforcements could be brought up to contain and defeat the Italians.

== Wounding and death ==
On 2 November 1940, near the village of Samarina, while directing his unit, Davakis was hit in the chest suffering serious lung injury and lapsing into a coma. Although he regained consciousness two days later, he remained hospitalized in battlefield.

In December 1942, he was arrested by the Italian occupation authorities, along with other Greek officers, suspected of participation in the Greek Resistance. The officers were to be shipped to POW camps in Italy on the liner Città di Genova, but the ship was torpedoed and sank off near southern Albania in January 1943. Davakis' body was recognized and buried in Vlorë. After the war, his remains were exhumed and transferred to Athens First Cemetery.

== Legacy ==
In Greece Davakis is considered as the hero of the Pindus Front. The Greek Army military camp outside Sparta bears his name.

== Gallery ==
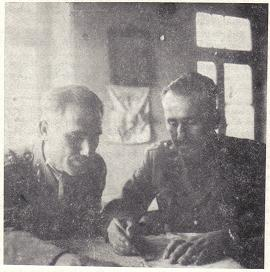
Davakis (right) with major Ioannis Karavias

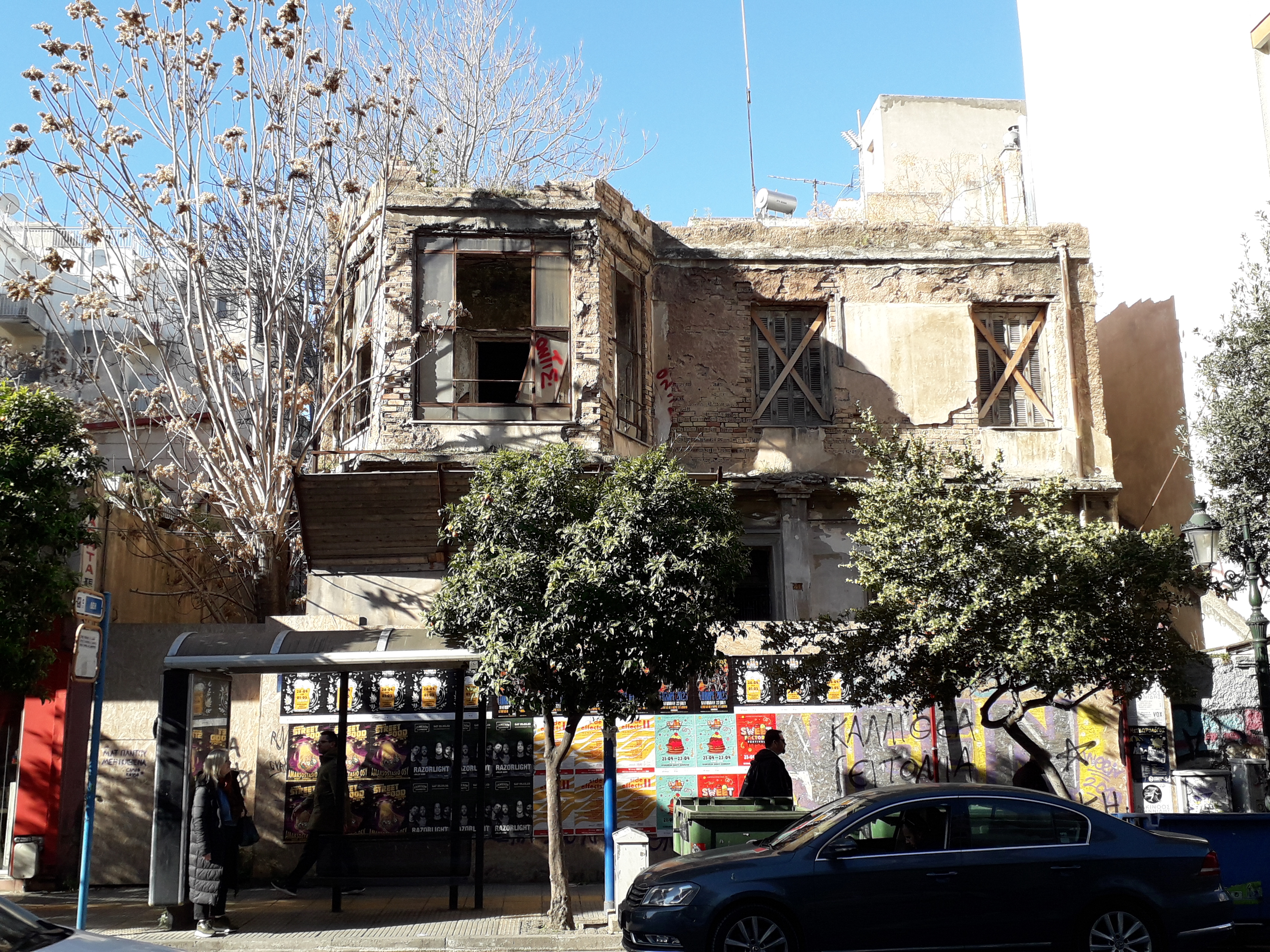
Davakis' house in Kallithea

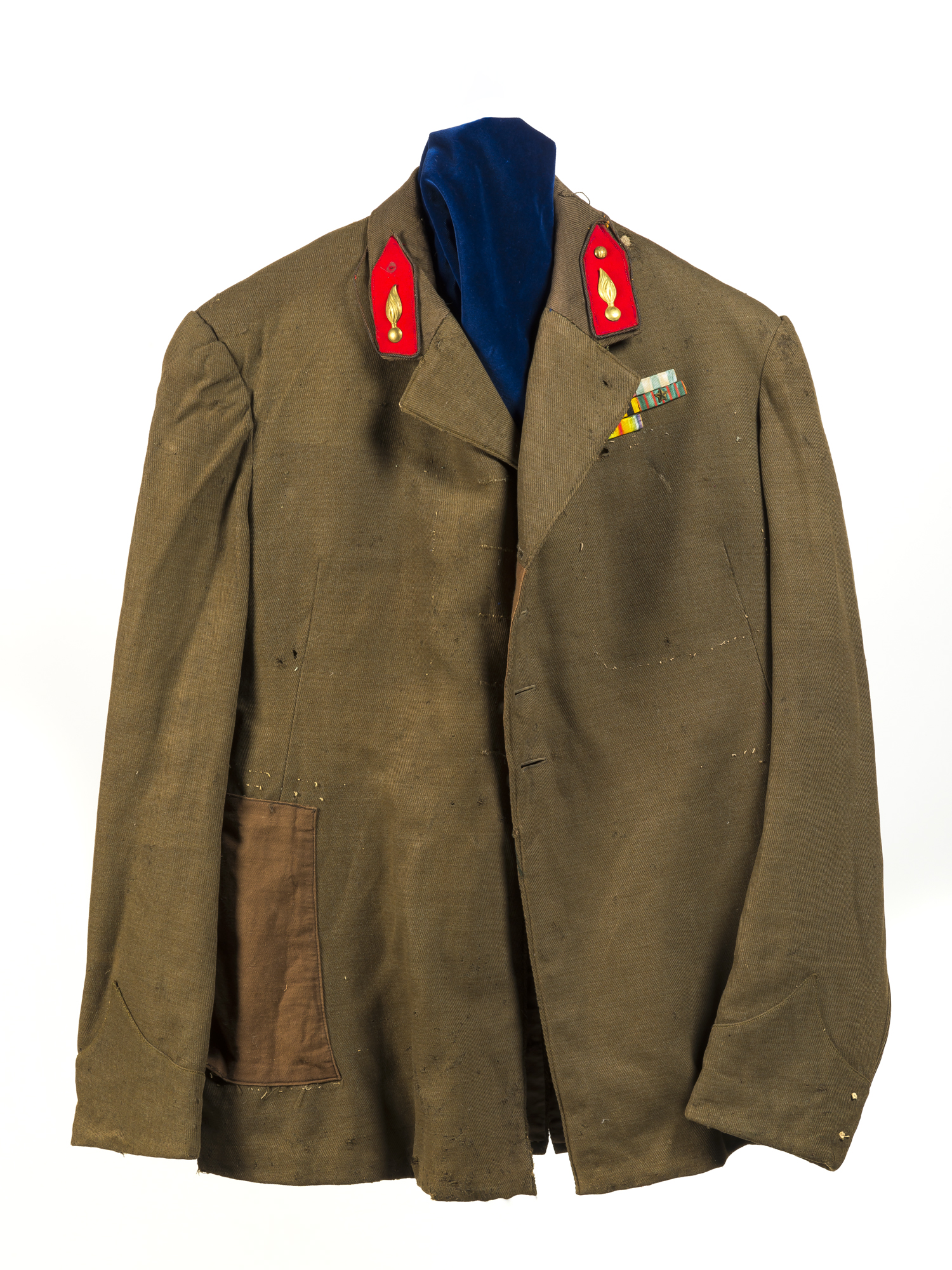
Davakis' military uniform during Pindus battle

== Sources ==
- Kōstas N. Chatzēpateras, Maria S. Phaphaliou, Patrick Leigh Fermor. Greece 1940-41 eyewitnessed. Efstathiadis Group, 1995, ISBN 978-960-226-533-8.
- An abridged history of the Greek-Italian and Greek-German war, 1940-1941: (land operations). Hellenic Army General Staff, Army History Directorate, 1997.
