= Italian spring offensive =

Part of the Greco-Italian War in 1941

- Part of the Greco-Italian War
- The Italian spring offensive (red arrows)
Date	9–16 March 1941 (1 week)
Location	Italian-controlled Albania, south-east of Berat 40°20′32″N 20°06′19″E
Result	Greek victory

Belligerents
Italy	Greece

Commanders and leaders
(Kingdom of Italy) Benito Mussolini (Kingdom of Italy) Ugo Cavallero (Kingdom of Italy) Carlo Geloso	(Kingdom of Greece) Alexander Papagos (Kingdom of Greece) Georgios Lavdas (Kingdom of Greece) Georgios Grivas

Strength
9 divisions	6 divisions

Casualties and losses
24,000+	1,243 killed 42 missing 4,016 wounded

The Italian spring offensive, also known as Operazione Primavera (Operation Spring), was an offensive of the Greco-Italian War that lasted from 9 to 16 March 1941. The offensive was the last Italian attempt of the war to defeat the Greek forces, which had already advanced deep into Italian-controlled Albania. The opening of the offensive was personally supervised by the Italian dictator Benito Mussolini but ended a week later in complete failure.

== Background ==
On 28 October 1940, Fascist Italy declared war upon Greece. The Italian 9th Army and 11th Army invaded north-west Greece from Albania. They were soon pushed back and the Greek army launched a counter-attack deep into Albanian territory. In February 1941, intensive preparations to strengthen the Italian front line began. By the end of the month, the 15 Italian divisions fighting in Albania had been reinforced by an additional ten divisions. In order to raise the morale of the soldiers, Benito Mussolini ordered the units to be accompanied by the most aggressive fascist cadres and also by government ministers and high-ranking officials.

== Operations ==
The operation was to be directed and observed by Mussolini, who arrived in Tirana on 2 March 1941; Italian radio announced that Mussolini would lead the Italian attack. The offensive began on 9 March, under General Carlo Geloso and started with heavy bombardment of Greek positions by artillery and aircraft. Eleven infantry divisions attacked with the support of the 131st Armored Division "Centauro". a heavy artillery barrage and air bombardment; on the main sector, held by the Greek 1st Division, over 100,000 shells were dropped on a 6 km (3.7 mi) front. Despite repeated assaults and heavy shelling, the positions of 1st Division held during 9–10 March. The attack was mainly directed against the 1st, 2nd, 5th, 11th, 15th and 17th divisions of the Greek army and was followed by repeated infantry assaults between the rivers Osum and Vjosa, an area dominated by Mount Trebeshinë.

On 14 March, Italian General Ugo Cavallero, realizing that the attacks had failed, advised Mussolini to stop the offensive. Fierce fighting occurred on height 731, which was assaulted by the Italians at least 18 times. Attacks, preceded by heavy artillery bombardments, followed daily until 24 March, the last day of the Italian offensive, without achieving any result. The Greek forces maintained an active defence, which included counter-attacks and systematic exploitation of advantageous terrain. Decisive factors in the Greek success were that Greek artillery was not neutralized and the high morale of the Greek troops.

== Aftermath ==
Mussolini admitted that the result of the Italian offensive was zero. Italian casualties amounted to over 11,800 killed and wounded, while the Greeks suffered 1,243 killed, 4,016 wounded and 42 missing in action. After the Italian failure the Germans could no longer expect any appreciable support from their Italian allies when they marched against Greece, since Greek forces were only 16 kilometres (10 mi) away from the strategic port of Vlorë. With the German intervention and the subsequent capitulation of Greece in April 1941, the sector around height "731" was proclaimed a holy area by the Italians and a monument was erected by them, due to the heavy casualties they suffered.

Although it failed, the spring offensive further exhausted the Greek Army which had been fighting a numerically larger power continuously for the past six months with significant British material support. Following the successful Greek defence, the Greek Army as a whole possessed only a single month's supply of heavy artillery ammunition and insufficient supplies to equip its reserves; requests were immediately sent to their British allies for millions of artillery shells and tens of millions of rifle rounds. This proved to be a logistical impossibility for the British.

Hitler would never leave his ally, Fascist Italy, to be defeated in the war against Greece, so he had issued orders for Third Reich's military intervention (Operation Marita) already from December 1940. After German intervention ensured a quick Axis victory, Hitler later acknowledged that the German invasion of Greece was greatly facilitated by the Italians holding down and bleeding white, the greater part of Greece's limited military forces.

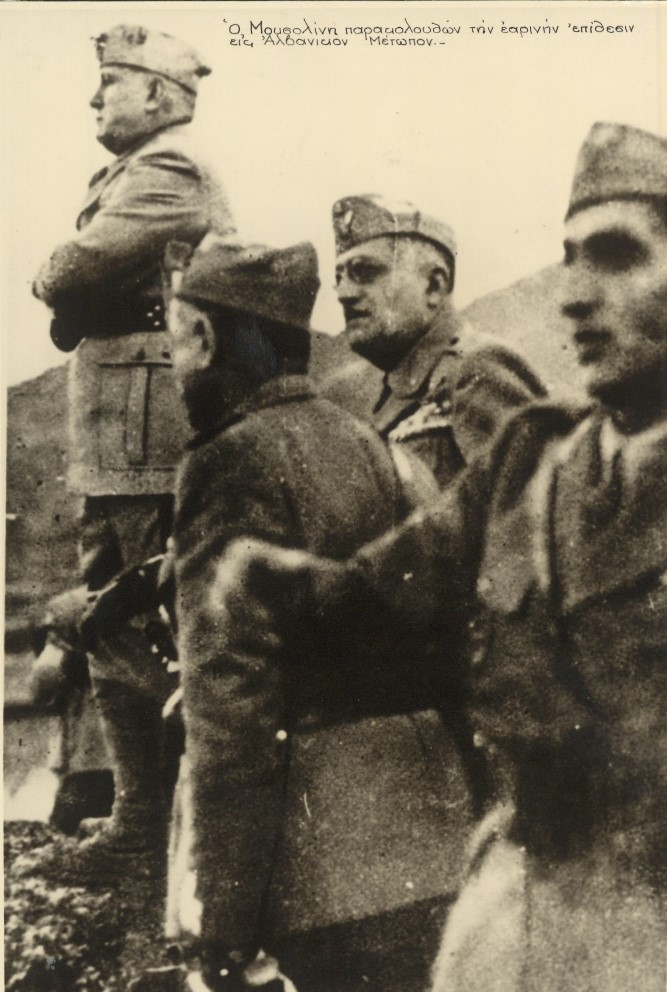
Benito Mussolini supervises the offensive
