= Giannis Stathas =

Greek armatole (c. 1758–1812)

Giannis Stathas Γιάννης Σταθάς
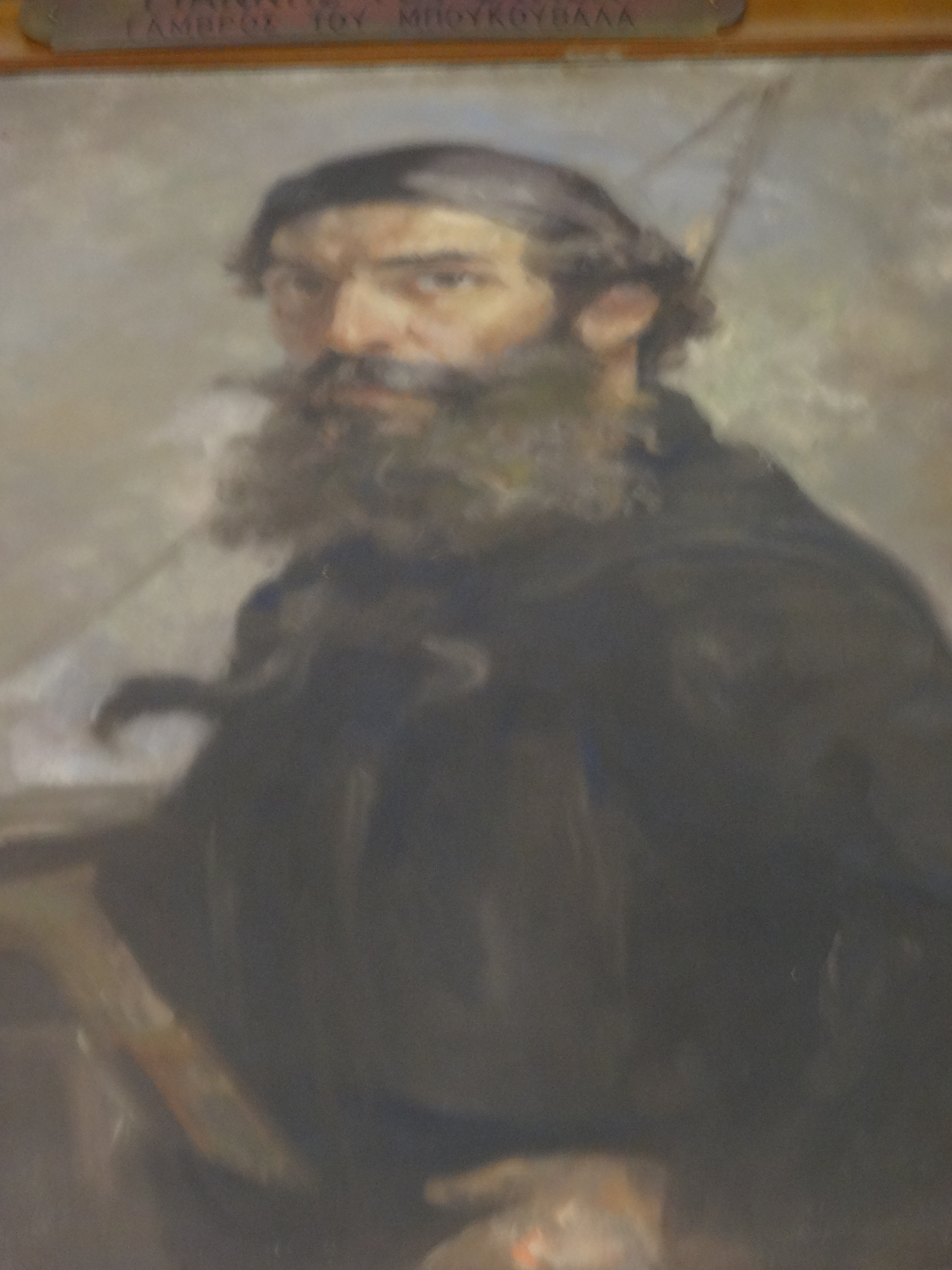
- Born: c. 1758; Dounista, Ottoman Empire (now Stathas, Greece)
- Died: 1812; Karvassaras, Ottoman Empire

Giannis Stathas (Greek: Γιάννης Σταθάς; c. 1758–1812) was a Greek armatole during the pre-Greek Revolution era in Greece. He later became leader of a small fleet in the Aegean Sea.

== Family background ==
His father was Gerodimos Stathas, head of the Stathaioi family in the Valtos region in Central Greece. Gerodimos took part in the unsuccessful Orlov Revolt. After the Russo-Turkish War ended, Gerodimos successfully defended against the Turkish reprisals that followed.

== Revolutionary acts ==
In 1804, he formed a regiment to help the Serbs that were rebelling against the Ottoman rule. After that he and some other armatoles in the Olympus area declared the revolution against the Ottoman Sultan. The Russian Emperor Alexander I had promised them help, but they were again left to their fate.

Stathas and a group of Greek military commanders fled to the Aegean Sea. In 1807, Kolokotronis met with them in Skiathos. There, Stathas and Nikotsaras were initiated to the Filiki Eteria.

== The Black Ships ==
The group built up a fleet of 70 small ships divided into 10 squadrons. Giannis Iskos was named Admiral of this fleet with Nikotsaras second in command. The fleet allegedly hailed the flag that was to become the Greek national flag after the revolution. All 70 ships were painted black. As, at the time, they were not serving a State and no war was declared, they were considered pirates.

They took action in the Aegean sea, harassing the Turkish navy and blockading major ports in Thessaly, Macedonia and Asia Minor. During their 10-month reign, Salonica suffered from a loose blockade as the "pirates" captured most of the ships entering or leaving the port.

After 10 months, heavy winter and lack of ammunition obliged Giannis Stathas to disassemble the fleet.

== End of life ==
He returned to Valtos and little is known for him thereafter. He was allegedly killed in Amfilochia in 1812.
