= Emmanouil Manousogiannakis =

Greek Army officer

- Εμμανουήλ Μανουσογιαννάκης
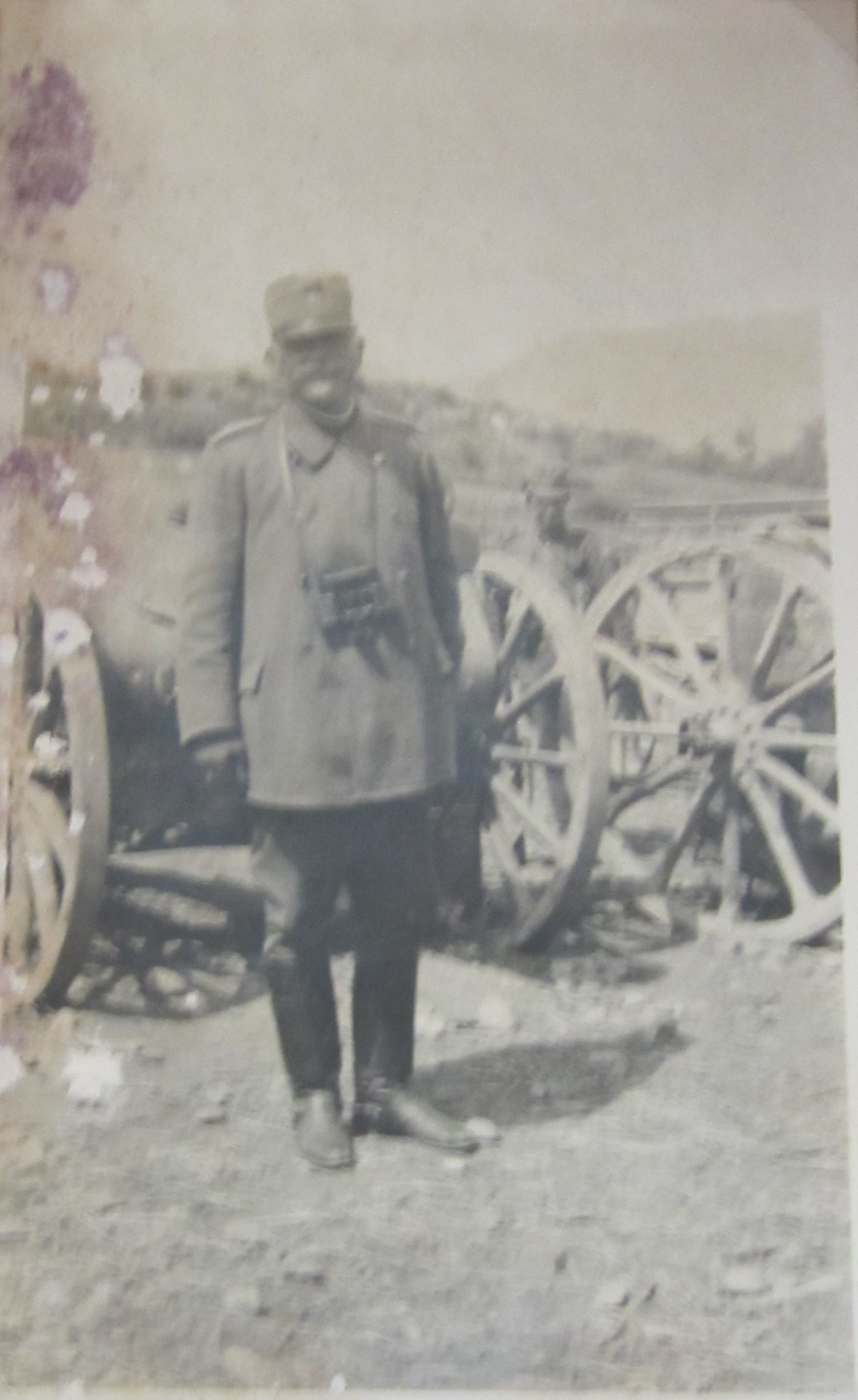
- Emmanouil Manousogiannkis c. 1912

Minister of Military Affairs
- In office 29 July – 28 August 1909
- Monarch: George I
- Prime Minister: Dimitrios Rallis

Personal details
- Born: c. 1853 Sfakia, Eyalet of Crete, Ottoman Empire (now Greece)
- Died: 24 July 1916 Patras, Kingdom of Greece
- Education: Hellenic Army Academy

Military service
- Allegiance: Kingdom of Greece
- Branch/service: Hellenic Army
- Years of service: 1877–1916
- Rank: Lieutenant General
- Commands: 1st Infantry Division; II Army Corps
- Battles/wars: Greco-Turkish War of 1897; Cretan Revolt; Balkan Wars; First Balkan War; Battle of Sarantaporo; Battle of Yenidje; Second Balkan War; Battle of Kilkis-Lachanas; Battle of Kresna Gorge

Emmanouil Manousogiannakis (Greek: Εμμανουήλ Μανουσογιαννάκης, c. 1853 – 24 July 1916) was a senior Hellenic Army officer who distinguished himself in the Balkan Wars of 1912–1913.

He was born in the region of Sfakia in Crete (then still part of the Ottoman Empire) in about 1853. He studied at the Hellenic Military Academy and was commissioned into the Army as an ensign of the artillery. During the Greco-Turkish War of 1897, he participated in the Greek expeditionary corps to his native Crete under Colonel Timoleon Vassos.

In 1909, with the rank of colonel, he served as Minister of Military Affairs in the short-lived cabinet of Dimitrios Rallis, which was toppled by the Goudi coup. In early 1911 Manousogiannakis was placed as commander of the 1st Infantry Division at Larissa. His division's performance during the great spring manoeuvres of 1912 earned him a promotion to major general. Manousogiannakis led the 1st Division during both Balkan Wars, and distinguished himself especially during the Second Balkan War against Bulgaria in the battles of Lachanas and Kresna.

After the war, he was promoted to lieutenant general and placed in command of the newly established II Army Corps at Patras. There he died on 24 July 1916.
