= Army of Thessaly =

The Army of Thessaly (Greek: Στρατιά Θεσσαλίας) was a field army of Greece, activated in Thessaly during the Greco-Turkish War of 1897 and the First Balkan War in 1912, both times against the Ottoman Empire and commanded by Crown Prince Constantine.

== 1897 ==
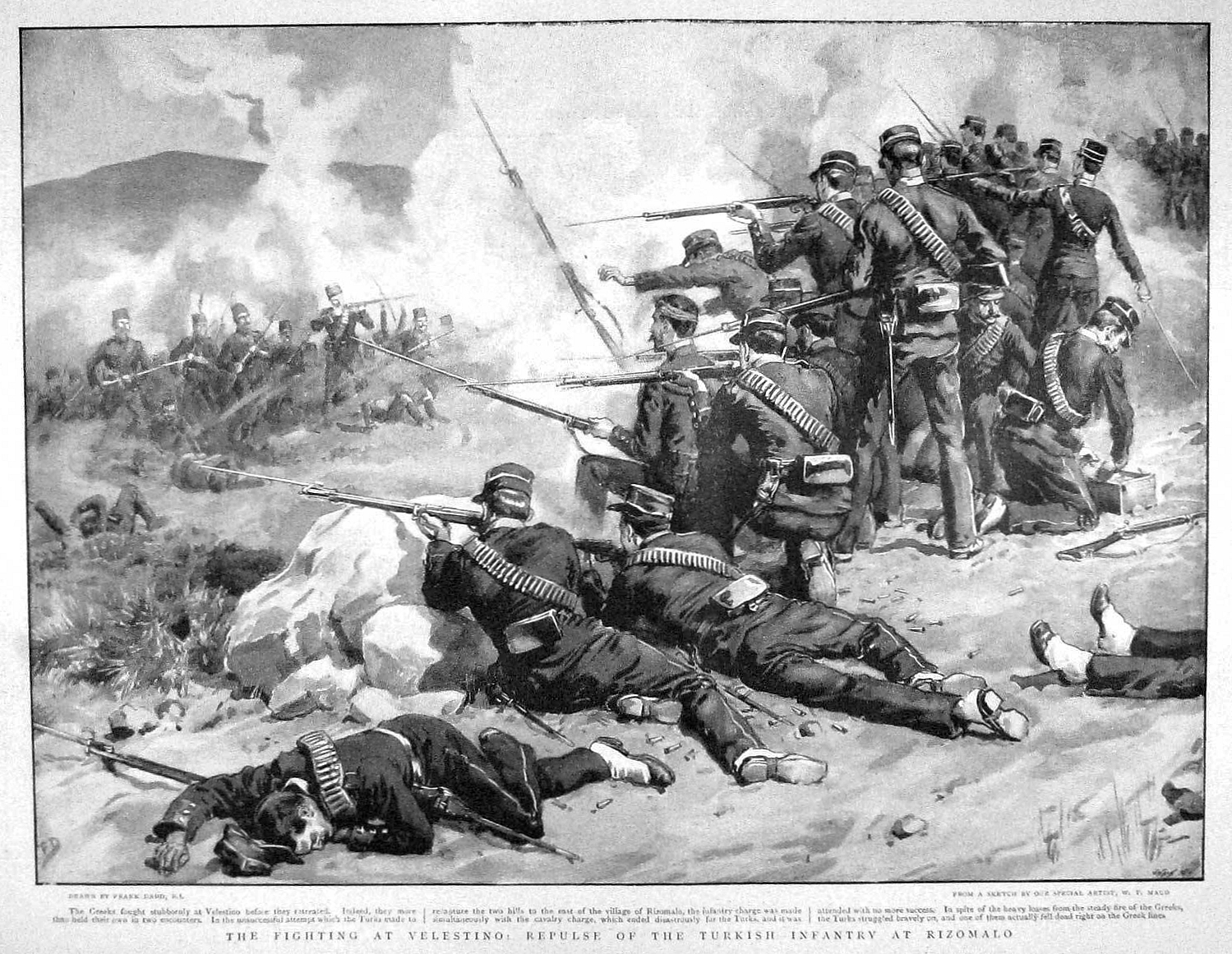
Firefight between Greeks and Turks at Rizomalo

In preparation for the war, two of the three infantry divisions in the Hellenic Army, 1st Infantry Division under Major General Nikolaos Makris and 2nd Infantry Division under Colonel Georgios Mavromichalis were mobilized and moved to Larissa and Trikala respectively. On 25 March, Crown Prince Constantine was named commander-in-chief of the Army of Thessaly, comprising these two divisions and support units, with Colonel Konstantinos Sapountzakis as his chief of staff. The Army of Thessaly comprised 36,000 men, 500 cavalry and 96 guns.

When hostilities broke out on 18 April, the Army of Thessaly was defeated in successive battles on the border passes, the Battle of Farsala and the Battle of Domokos. By the time of the armistice on 20 May, the Army of Thessaly had been pushed out of Thessaly proper by the Ottoman advance.

== 1912 ==
As war with the Ottoman Empire increasingly became a possibility in the early autumn of 1912, the bulk of the Hellenic Army was gathered in Thessaly, once again under Crown Prince Constantine, comprising the four peacetime infantry divisions and three newly formed from reservists, a cavalry brigade, and auxiliary units, for a total of some 100,000 men, of which ca. 80,000 effectives.

In the course of the First Balkan War, the Army of Thessaly overcame the fortified Ottoman positions along the border in the Battle of Sarantaporo and advanced north. Despite a setback of a detached division in the Battle of Sorovich, the main army broke through the Ottoman defences at the Battle of Yenidje, forcing, after a few days, the surrender of Thessaloniki and its garrison. Having effected the union with the allied Serbian and Bulgarian armies, the Army of Thessaly was deactivated, with some units going to reinforce the Epirus front and others settling along the new demarcation line in Macedonia.
