= 1st Infantry Division (Greece) =

Greek Army formation

1st Infantry Division "Smyrni"
- 1η Μεραρχία Πεζικού «ΣΜΥΡΝΗ» (Ι ΜΠ)
- Emblem of the 1st Infantry Division
- Active: 1897–1916; 1917–1941; 1948–1954; 1974–present
- Country: Greece
- Branch: Hellenic Army
- Role: Rapid Reaction Force; Special Forces
- Size: 5 Brigades
- Part of: Special Warfare Command
- Garrison/HQ: Veroia, Macedonia
- Mottos: [Like The] Wind; ΑΕΡΑ; Aera
- Engagements: Greco-Turkish War (1897); Battle of Domokos; Balkan Wars; First Balkan War; Battle of Sarantaporo; Second Balkan War; Battle of Kilkis-Lachanas; Battle of Kresna Gorge; World War I; Macedonian front; Greco-Turkish War (1919–1922); Greek landing at Smyrna; Battle of Aydin; Battle of the Sakarya; World War II; Greco-Italian War; Battle of Pindus; Italian Spring Offensive; Battle of Hill 731; Battle of Greece; Greek Civil War; IFOR/SFOR; 1997 Albanian civil unrest; ISAF

Commanders
- Notable commanders: Nikolaos Makris; Emmanouil Manousogiannakis; Nikolaos Zafeiriou; Vasileios Vrachnos

The 1st Infantry Division "Smyrni" (Greek: I Μεραρχία Πεζικού «ΣΜΥΡΝΗ» (Ι ΜΠ), romanized: I Merarchía Pezikoú "Smýrni") is a historic and elite division of the Hellenic Army. It was founded in 1897 as an infantry division and has fought in all major conflicts in which Greece has been involved. During the Balkan Wars, it acquired the sobriquet "Iron Division" (Greek: «Σιδηρά Μεραρχία», romanized: Sidirá Merarchía).

It is currently headquartered in Veroia, Macedonia. Despite its title, it is no longer a conventional infantry division, but a formation comprising the various special forces of the Hellenic Army - a role similar to that once held by the now disbanded 3rd Special Forces Division.

== History ==
=== Greco-Turkish War of 1897 ===
The 1st Infantry Division was established in Larissa on 19 March 1897 before the outbreak of, and in response to, the Greco-Turkish War. Formed, predominantly, from personnel recruited from Thessaly, it originally comprised two infantry brigades (1st and 2nd) and three Evzone battalions, and was tasked with the defence of the frontier from the Thermaic Gulf (near the Tria Platania heights) to the Bogazi pass, near Tyrnavos. Its first commander was Major General Nikolaos Makris.

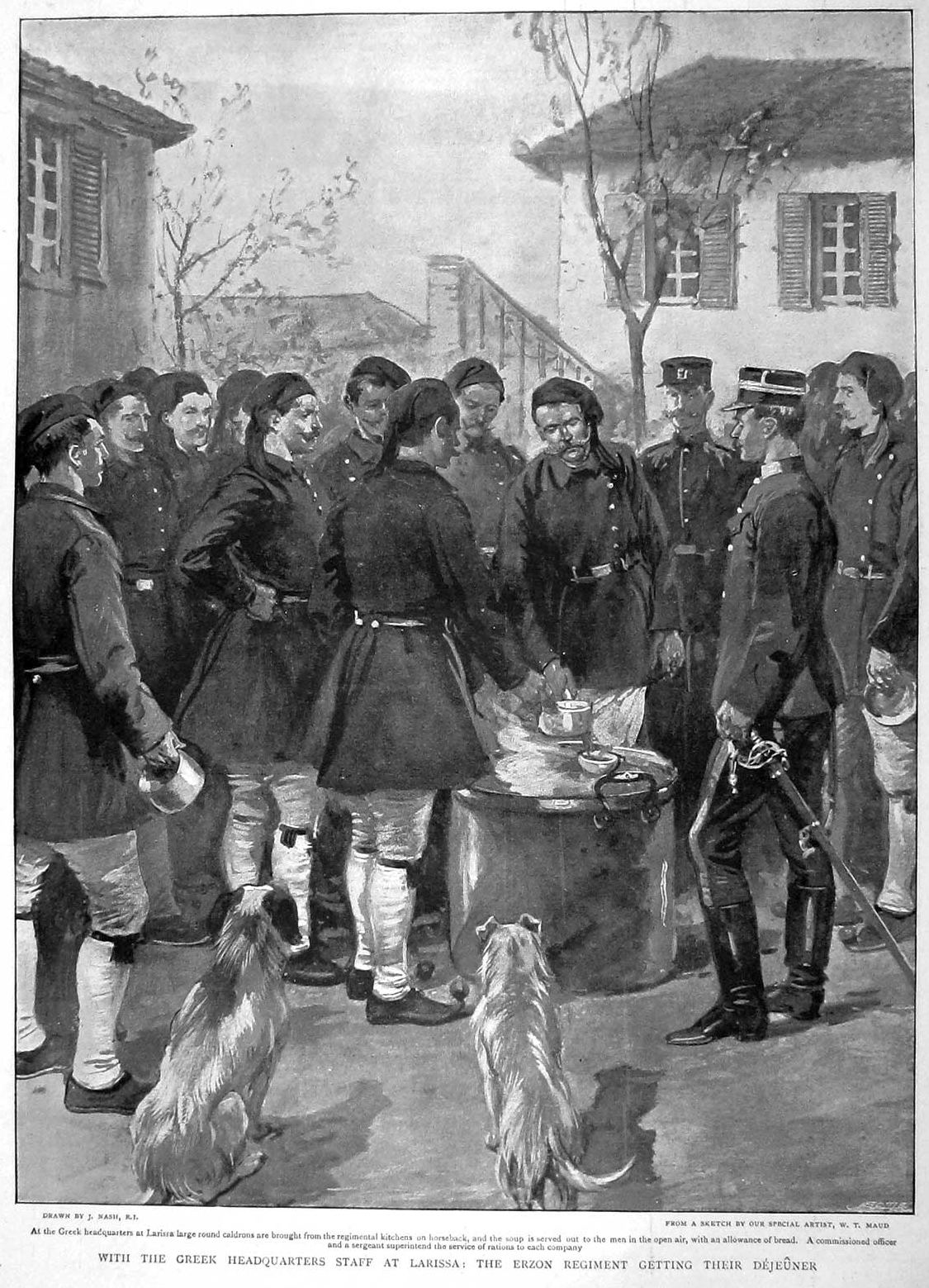
Evzones of the 1st Infantry Division at breakfast, Larissa 1897.

Based in Rapsani, on the division's right flank, was the Nezeros Detachment (Απόσπασμα Νεζερού Apospasma Nezerou), consisting of the three Evzone battalions and two companies from the 5th Infantry Regiment. The left flank, from Godoman to Bogazi, was controlled by the 2nd Infantry Brigade, based at Tyrnavos. The 1st Infantry Brigade was kept in reserve at Larissa. Divisional Command, under Major-General Nikolaos Makris, was also based in Larissa.

On 4 April 1897, an exchange of fire between soldiers from opposing outposts at Bairaktari gradually escalated to skirmishes along the frontier in the Rapsani sector. The next morning, the Nezerou Detachment launched a major attack, captured most of the Turkish outposts and forced a retreat along the line. Turkish counter-attacks were held back on the flanks, but the three Greek battalions defending the center were soon overwhelmed by twenty-two Turkish battalions and five artillery batteries. Greek forces quickly retreated to Mati, leaving the Melouna Pass undefended. As a result, the 2nd Infantry Brigade was also forced to retreat to Mati.

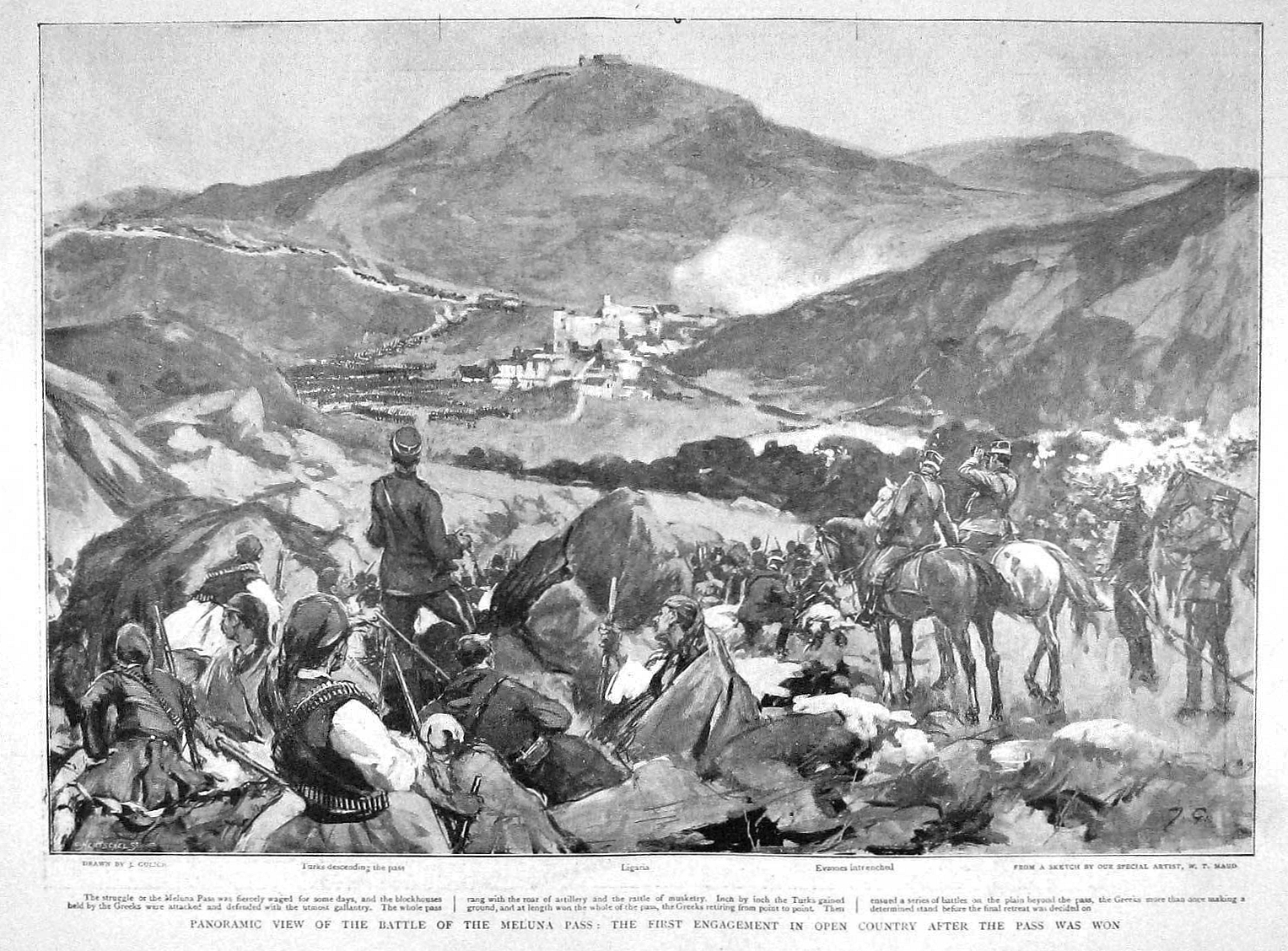
Panoramic view of the battlefield at the Melouna Pass on the Greco-Turkish border, with Greek positions in the foreground and the advancing Turks beyond, 1897.

The Nezeros Detachment was again forced to abandon its positions near Mati on 9 April 1897 and retreat towards the Pineios River. The battle at Deleria on 11 April 1897 resulted in a defeat for the division, which continued their retreat towards Larissa. The 1st Infantry Division, beaten and demoralized, marched towards Farsala where on 23 April 1897, the Turkish Army attacked the Greek 1st and 2nd Brigades on the northern outskirts of the town. In danger of being cut-off and surrounded, the division was able to regroup and retreat to Domokos where they formed a defensive line on the right flank of the Greek Army.

Led by the 3rd Infantry Division, the Turkish offensive on the right flank of the Greek 1st Infantry Division on 5 May 1897 forced a Greek retreat, again, towards Vouzi. The division's center, under attack by the Turkish 6th Infantry Division, also retreated. However, on the left flank, the Greek units were able to defend successfully against the Turkish 2nd Infantry Division. Another Turkish attack on the left flank on 6 May 1897 was repelled, but the 1st Infantry Division was ordered to retreat to, and hold the line, at Lamia.

A ceasefire was agreed at midday on 7 May 1897. The 1st Infantry Division had lost 232 killed and 842 wounded. Greece's defeat in the Greco-Turkish War of 1897 had highlighted the many deficiencies of the Greek military. Through the efforts of Georgios Theotokis and Eleftherios Venizelos plans were put in place to modernize and improve the capabilities of the Greek Army, eventually leading to French involvement and the adoption of the triangular division.

=== First Balkan War ===
At the outbreak of the First Balkan War, under the command of Major-General Emmanouil Manousogiannakis, the 1st Infantry Division was attached to the Army of Thessaly. The division comprised the following units:

- 2nd Infantry Regiment, based at Lamia
- 4th Infantry Regiment, based at Larissa
- 5th Infantry Regiment, based at Trikala
- 1st and 2nd Squadrons from the 1st Field Artillery Regiment, based at Larissa
- Engineer Company, based at Larissa
- Support Squadron consisting of field hospital, ambulance, convoy and ordnance troops, based at Larissa

On 5 October 1912, the division moved to, and recaptured, the Melouna Pass. The engagement resulted in the first casualties for the newly reorganized division (9 killed, 20 wounded). Ordered to defend the Tyrnavos-Kazaklar sector while the rest of the Greek Army mobilized, the 1st Division was reinforced by four Evzone battalions. On 6 October 1912, the division attacked well-entrenched Turkish positions on the northern outskirts of Elassona. The battle was hard-fought, with victory for the Greeks secured when forces on the division's right flank captured Turkish positions on the Tsaritsani heights. The Turks were soon forced to abandon their positions around the town.

The 1st Division then marched toward Sarantaporo, arriving in the area on the night of 8 October 1912. The Ottoman VIII Corps, ordered to halt the Greek Army's advance north, had retreated and regrouped around the town. On 9 October 1912, during the Battle of Sarantaporo, the 1st Infantry Division, along with the 2nd and 3rd divisions, began a full frontal assault on Turkish positions. Withstanding heavy casualties during their advance, primarily due to accurate Turkish artillery barrage, the 1st Division managed to capture a shoulder and two nearby hillocks. On the division's right wing, the Konstantinopoulos Evzone Detachment (Απόσπασμα Ευζώνων Κωνσταντινόπουλου Apospasma Evzonon Konstadinopoulou) was able to advance and capture Turkish positions at Livadi. The Greek 4th Infantry Division, in the meantime, had broken through Turkish lines on the western flank and captured the Porta Pass. On the night of 9 October 1912 Turkish forces, taking advantage of the bad weather, retreated and escaped encirclement. A Turkish battalion remained, facing the Konstantinopoulos Detachment's positions at Livadi, oblivious to their comrades' retreat. On the morning of 10 October 1912, the Evzones attacked the Turks, forcing them to retreat to Neochori.

The two-day battle had cost the 1st Infantry Division 53 killed (5 officers and 48 enlisted) and 399 wounded (12 officers and 387 enlisted).

=== Second Balkan War ===
The 1st Infantry Division was ordered to the area between Lake Volvi and Lake Langada, east of Thessaloniki, at the outbreak of the Second Balkan War. On 19 June 1913, the division assaulted Bulgarian positions at Ossa, taking the town the same day. The assault cost the division 9 killed and 79 wounded. The following day, with the arrival of the 6th Infantry Division, which had just lost 530 men in the successful capture of the Dichalo-Klepe line, two divisions marched north to engage the Bulgarian Army, which had heavily entrenched itself around Lahanas. The 1st Infantry Division assaulted and captured Vertiskos, then joined its left flank with the 6th Division's right, which had arrived from the west.

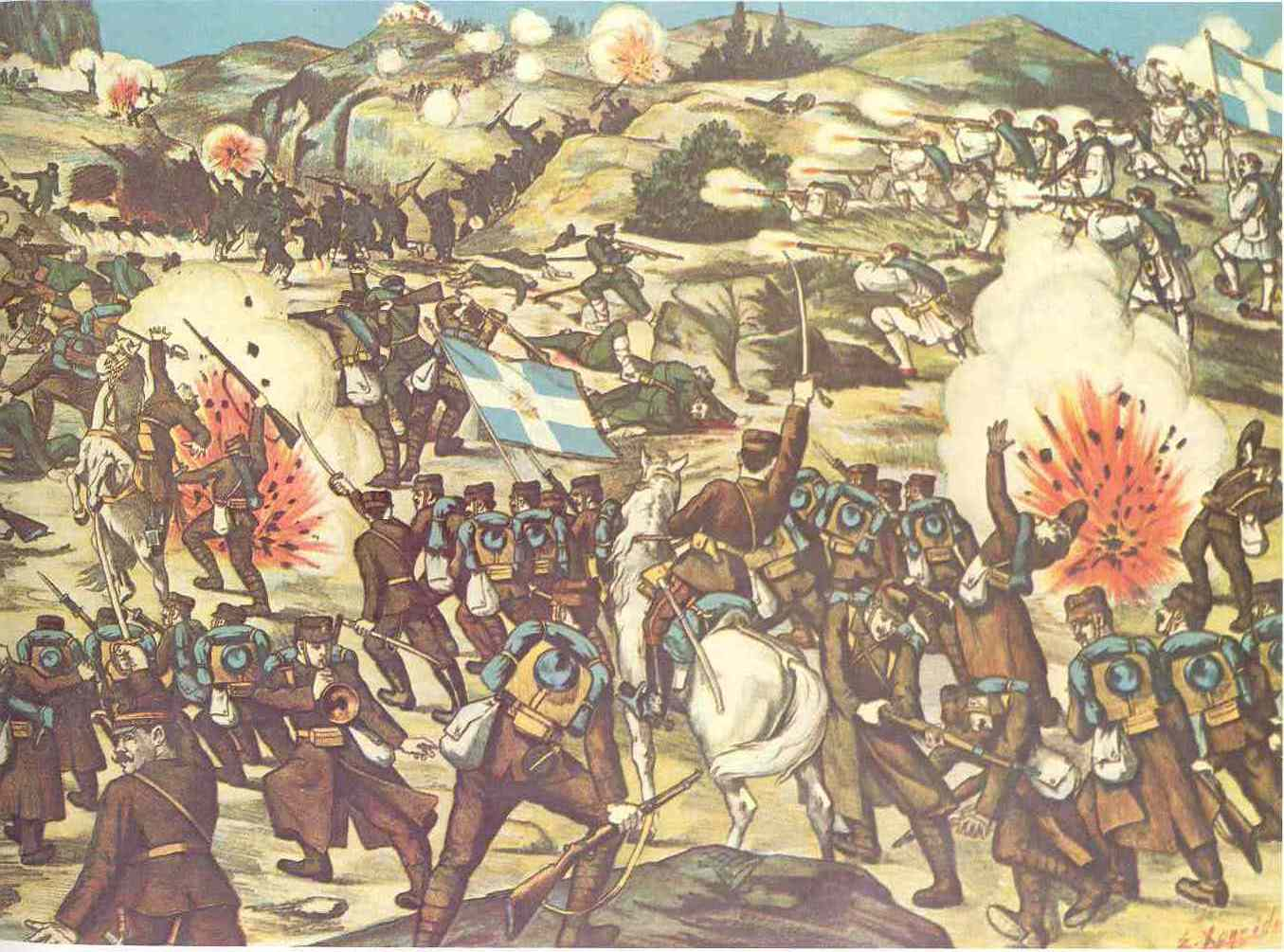
The 1st Infantry Division attacking Bulgarian lines during the Battle of Lachanas, 1913.

On 20 June 1913 the two divisions attacked the main Bulgarian defensive lines at Lachanas while encountering a heavy barrage from well-positioned Bulgarian artillery. The Bulgarians tenaciously defended their positions, repelling Greek attacks until night, when there was a break in the battle. On the morning of 21 June 1913, the 5th Infantry Regiment was ordered to detach and prepare to move to assist Greek forces engaged at Kilkis. The Bulgarians, observing the Greek 3/5 Battalion's withdrawal, launched an attack on the 1/5 Battalion's positions near the town of Kydonia, forcing it to retreat with heavy losses. The commander of the 5th Infantry Regiment, seeing the town fall, took personal command of the 2/5 Battalion and launched a successful counter-attack on the advancing Bulgarians.

On the afternoon of 21 June 1913 the two Greek divisions, in coordination with artillery, launched an assault on the defensive lines of the Bulgarians, forcing their disorderly retreat towards the River Strymon. The 1st Infantry Division lost 11 officers and 180 enlisted soldiers killed in the engagement, including the commander of the 4th Infantry Regiment – Colonel Ioannis Papakyriazis. The wounded were 30 officers and 836 enlisted soldiers, with 211 missing in action.

Soon after the battle, the 1st, along with the 6th and 7th divisions, were formed into an Army Section with the purpose of discovering and eliminating Bulgarian forces in the area around Sidirokastro. Commanded by Manousogiannakis, the section began its mission on 26 June 1913, fighting its way towards Sidirokastron and eventually taking the town. However, the Bulgarian 3rd Infantry Division managed to escape capture by retreating through the Rupel Pass. The two-day battle cost the 1st Division 4 killed, 75 wounded and 36 missing.

Bulgarian forces regrouped at Kresna Gorge to avoid encirclement with orders to hold the line along Ruggen, Kresna and Pirin. Greek GHQ ordered four divisions, including the 1st, to find a way to break through the Bulgarian line. During the Battle of Kresna Gorge, the 1st Infantry Division managed to drive back the Bulgarian rear-guard and capture a foothold at the southern end of the Kresna pass. The Bulgarian 2nd and 4th Armies, recently arrived from the Serbian front, ambushed Greek forces but were soon beaten back. The 1st Division advanced towards the stronghold of Simitli, which it captured after a two-day battle and the loss of 42 killed and 349 wounded.

=== Post-Balkan Wars period and World War I ===
In August 1913, the division was subordinated to the newly formed I Army Corps at its peacetime garrison at Larissa. During the National Schism, the division was demobilized and effectively disbanded in 1916.

In 1917, when Greece joined World War I on the side of the Entente Powers, the division was reconstituted as part of I Corps, and fought in the Macedonian front.

=== Asia Minor Campaign ===
On the afternoon of 11 May 1919, the commander of the 1st Infantry Division, Colonel Nikolaos Zafeiriou, received orders to mobilize the division for deployment at the port of Kavala. As a component of the I Army Corps, the division consisted of the following units:

- 1/38 Evzone Regiment
- 4th Infantry Regiment
- 5th Infantry Regiment
- a Cavalry half-company
- 1st and 2nd Squadrons from the 1st Field Artillery Regiment
- Two Engineer Companies.

On 15 May 1919, the division landed at Smyrna. The 1/38 Evzone Regiment was forced to land north of where it was to be stationed and had to march southward, past the Ottoman Konak and Turkish barracks. A shot was fired by Turkish journalist Hasan Tahsin, killing the Greek standard-bearer and resulting in the Greek troops attacking the Konak and barracks, whose troops surrendered and were subsequently escorted to a prison ship. The incident was the catalyst for an outbreak of violence and disorder in the city, which lasted for days. The first phase of the Asia Minor Campaign had begun.

The 1st Infantry Division was soon ordered to occupy the Vilayet of Aydin in the Menderes River (Meander) valley (including the towns of Aydın, Manisa and Turgutlu). On 27 June 1919 a Greek patrol, from one of the two Greek regiments based at Aydın, was attacked by irregular Turkish forces of Yörük Ali Efe at Malgaç train station, south of the town. In retaliation, surrounding villages were burned by Greek detachments but they were soon repulsed and pushed back towards Aydin. Surrounded and under heavy attack by the Turks, Greek soldiers evacuated on 30 June 1919, allowing Yörük Ali's irregulars to take control of the town. With the help of reinforcements sent by General Nider, the Greeks recaptured Aydin on 4 July 1919. Most of the casualties in the Battle of Aydın were civilians, both Turkish and Greek, victims of atrocities by Greek soldiers and Turkish irregulars, respectively.

Between March and June 1920 the 1st Division had moved to the northern edge of the Smyrna Zone in preparation for a major offensive on 10 June 1920. Units of the Greek I Army Corps began their attack on Turkish forces, the 1st Division advancing towards the Ovacik-Keles-Chaous Dag line. The offensive, which inflicted heavy losses on the Ottoman Army, saw Greek forces advance and secure the area as far east as Alaşehir. Less than a week after the Treaty of Sèvres, the Greek I Army Corps advanced to Uşak, with the 1st Division establishing its headquarters at Buladan. Greek Prime Minister Eleftherios Venizelos was voted out of power on 1 November 1920, forcing his withdrawal from politics. With the recall of King Constantine I on 6 December 1920 by a plebiscite, the anti-Venizelists took the opportunity to dismiss many experienced, yet pro-Venizelist, officers from their commands in Asia Minor, replacing them with inexperienced, but politically reliable, officers.

=== Greco-Italian War ===
Following the Italian invasion of Greece from Albania on 28 October 1940, the 1st Division, under Major General Vasileios Vrachnos, was one of the first Greek units sent to confront the invasion. The division played a crucial role in the Battle of Pindus, defeating the elite 3rd Alpine Division Julia, and again during the repulsion of the Italian Spring Offensive of March 1941, at the Battle of Hill 731. After the German invasion of Greece and the capitulation of the Greek army, the division was disbanded.

=== Post-war period ===
The 1st Division was reconstituted at Lamia in March 1948, and took part in the operations of the final year of the Greek Civil War. Between 1950 and 1954, it was moved to Konitsa, Tyrnavos, and Katerini, before being disbanded and converted to a reserve cadre formation, based at Larissa and later at Volos.

The division was mobilized in 1974, during the crisis around the Turkish invasion of Cyprus, and placed under the command of II Army Corps, moving its headquarters to Giannitsa. On 4 March 1998, the division was converted to an operational headquarters for II Corps, moving on 30 June 2003 to Agia Varvara, Imathia.

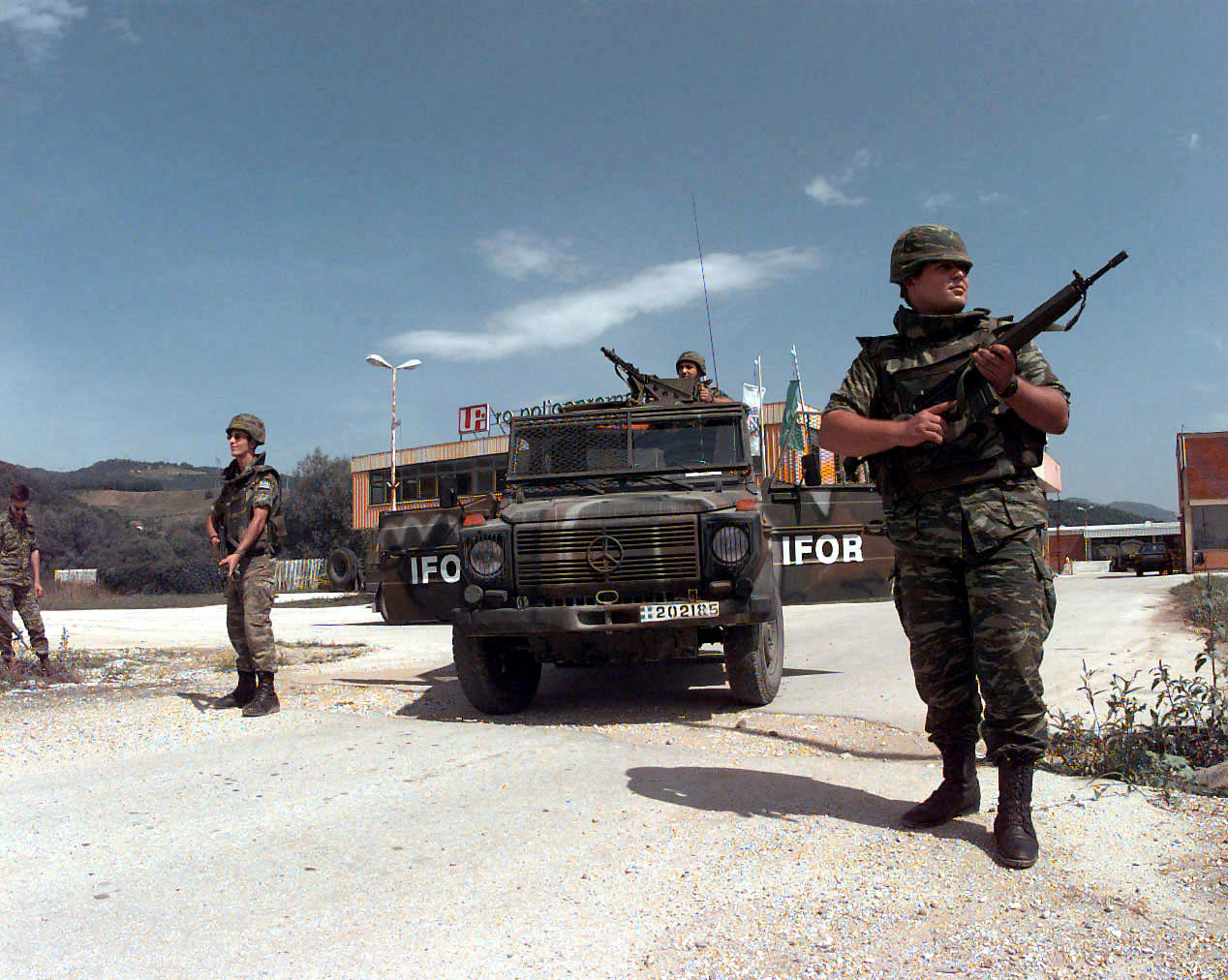
Greek IFOR soldiers safeguarding elections in Bosnia, 1996.

In the 1990s and 2000s, the 1st Division oversaw the training and deployment of Greek peacekeeping forces in the Balkans: in Bosnia (IFOR–SFOR), Albania during the Albanian unrest of 1997 (Operation Alba), and Afghanistan (ISAF).

Following a major reorganization of the Hellenic Army in 2013, the division moved to Veroia and took over most of the operational responsibilities of II Corps, which was disbanded, and took under its command the Army's special forces, marines, and air-mobile forces. As a result, 1st Division has no specific geographic area of responsibility, but is an elite intervention force under the operational control of the Chief of the Hellenic National Defence General Staff.

The division continues to be responsible for many of the Hellenic Army's international obligations: the 71st Airmobile Brigade, the 1st Army Aviation Brigade, and II Raider Squadron form part of the NATO Response Force under NRDC-GR headquarters, while the 71st Airmobile Brigade participates in the Balkan Battlegroup, and the 32nd Marines Brigade in the Spanish–Italian Amphibious Battlegroup.

== Organization ==
1st Infantry Division locations

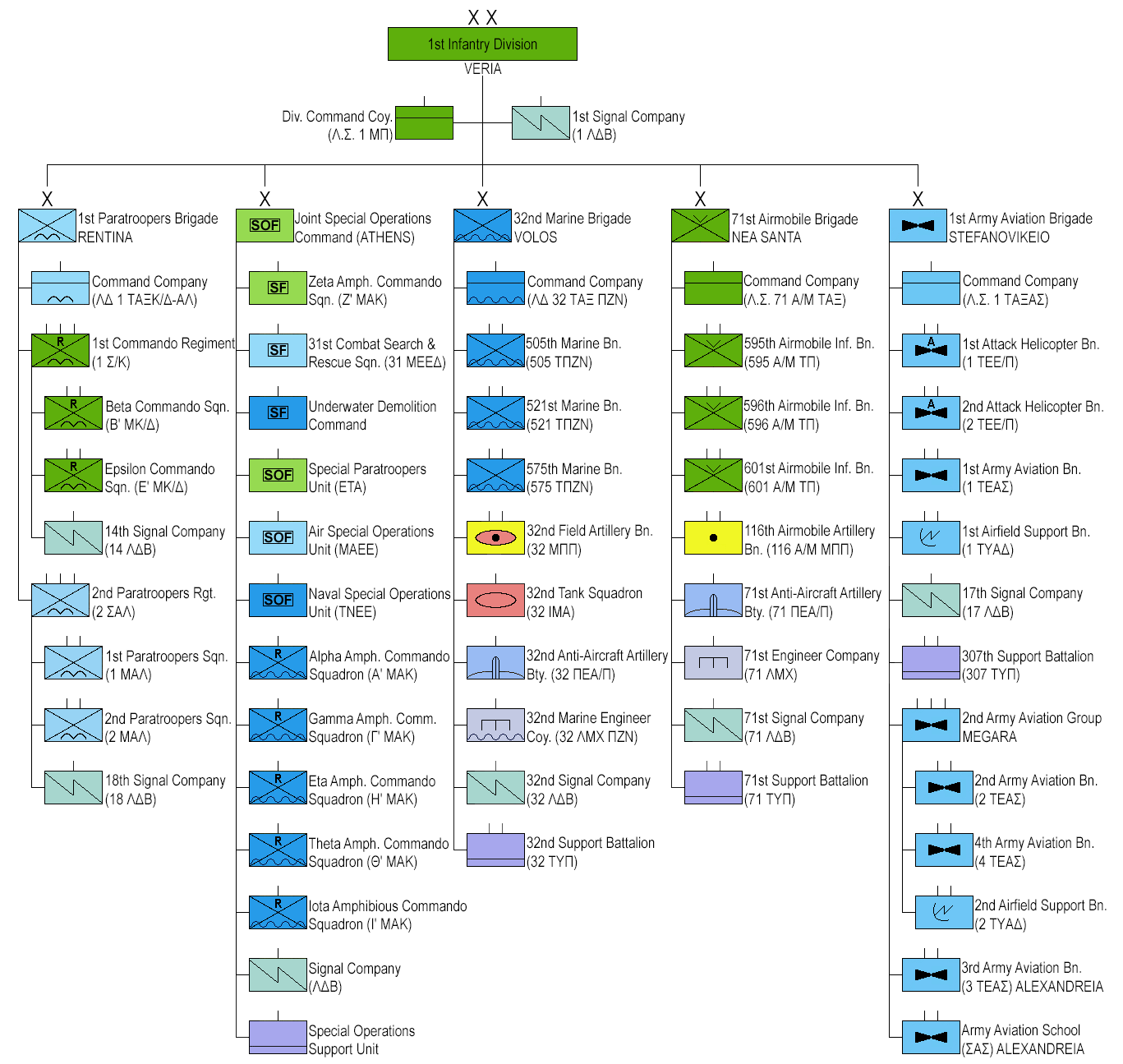
1st Infantry Division organisation 2025 (click to enlarge).

- 1st Infantry Divisionin Veria, (Central Macedonia)
  - Division Command Company (ΛΣ/Ι ΜΠ)
  - 1st Paratroopers Brigade, in Rentina, (Central Macedonia)
  - Joint Special Operations Command, in Athens, (Attica)
  - 32nd Marine Brigade, in Volos, (Thessaly)
  - 71st Airmobile Brigade, in Nea Santa, (Central Macedonia)
  - 1st Army Aviation Brigade, in Stefanovikeio, (Thessaly)
  - 1st Signal Company (1ος ΛΔΒ)

== Emblem and Motto ==
The emblem depicts a tsaroúhi, the traditional footwear of the Evzones, and a bayonet.

The motto of the I Infantry Division is "(Like The) Wind" (Greek: Αέρα|translit=Aéra), the traditional battle cry of Greek infantrymen when attacking the enemy.
