= Dimitrios Makris =

Greek chief klepht, armatole military commander and fighter of the 1821 revolution

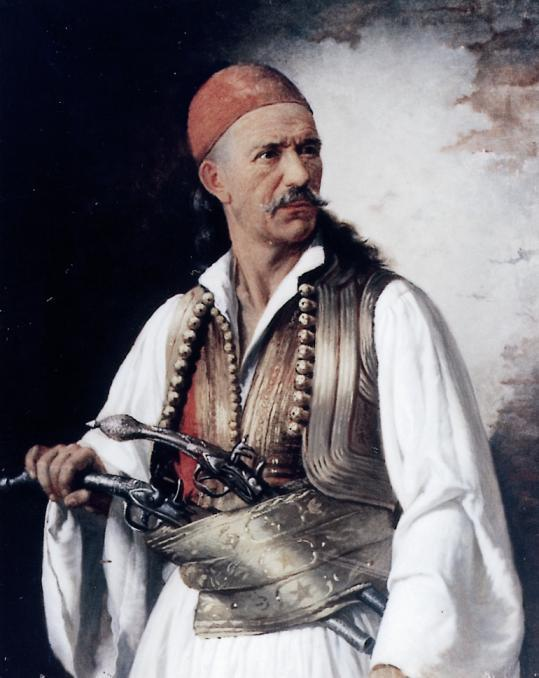
- A portrait of Dimitrios Makris.
- Native name: Δημήτριος Μακρής
- Born: c. 1772; Gavalou, Sanjak of Karli-Eli, Ottoman Empire (now Greece)
- Died: c. 1841 Gavalou, Aetolia, Kingdom of Greece
- Allegiance: (Greece) First Hellenic Republic; Kingdom of Greece
- Service years: 1821–1840
- Rank: General
- Conflicts: Greek War of Independence: Third Siege of Missolonghi
- Children: Nikolaos Makris (son)

Dimitrios Makris (Greek: Δημήτριος Μακρής, 1772–1841) was a Greek klepht and armatolos who was one of the most powerful chieftains in West Central Greece. He joined the Filiki Eteria and became a revolutionary during the Greek War of Independence.

== Early life ==
Dimitrios Makris was born in 1772 in Gavalou, Aetolia-Acarnania. His father was Evangelos Makris, who had taken part in the Greek revolt in 1770. After his death Dimitrios became Captain in the district of Zyghos.

== Greek War of Independence ==
He was originally a klepht under Captain Georgios Sfaltos, and took over command of his band after Sfaltos' death. He was appointed an armatolos at Zygos, and never collaborated with Ali Pasha of Janina. He acquired much wealth by plundering the Turks at Vrachori. He was initiated into the Filiki Eteria just before the revolution was launched in Western Greece on May 5, 1821. He participated as a representative of Zygos in the Assembly of Western Continental Greece in 1821.

He participated in many battles against the Ottoman Turks including the Third Siege of Missolonghi. During the siege Dimitrios Makris married Eupraxia, daughter of the city's notable Samos Razi-Kotsikas. He later fought in Agrinio and Aitoliko and with the collaboration of Georgios Karaiskakis troops attacked and repulsed a body of Albanians. Soon after he joined the troops of Alexandros Mavrokordatos. In 1823 he was named a general in the rebel army. After the establishment of the Greek kingdom Makris refrained from accepting any political and military honors. He returned to his home town, where he eventually died in 1841.

== Historical relics ==
Numerous weapons of Dimitros Makris are preserved in the City Hall of Missolonghi including the sword which he used in the Exodus of Missolonghi, which belonged to his ancestral family and dates back to the old fighters of 1732. The museum also hold his famous silver rifle, the Liaros.

== See also ==
- Alexandros Mavrokordatos
