= Georgios Stanotas =

Greek general

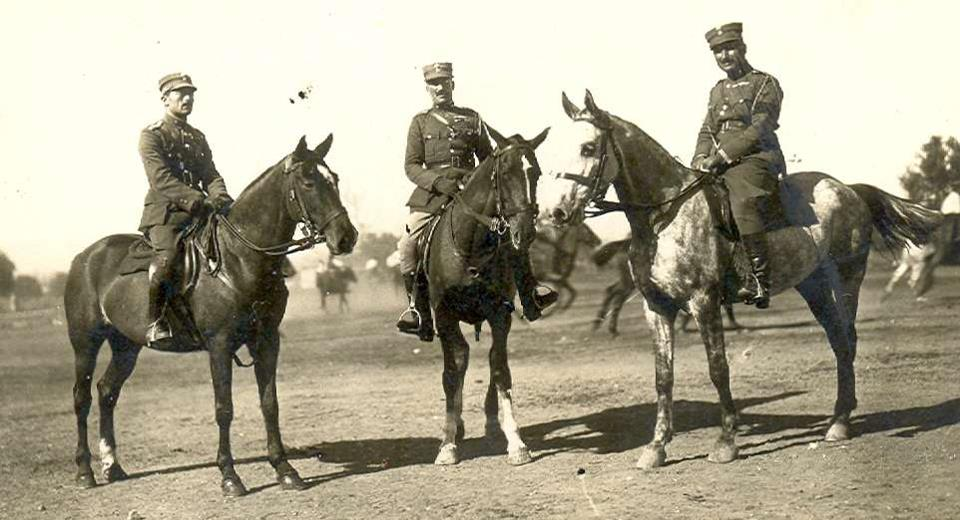
- Stanotas (centre) in Asia Minor c. 1919–22
- Native name: Γεώργιος Στανωτάς
- Born: 1 January 1888; Kastanitsa, Kingdom of Greece
- Died: 27 September 1965 Athens, Kingdom of Greece
- Allegiance: Kingdom of Greece; (Greece) Second Hellenic Republic
- Branch: Hellenic Army
- Service years: 1909–1948
- Rank: Lieutenant General
- Conflicts: Balkan Wars, Greco-Turkish War (1919-1922), Greco-Italian War, Battle of Greece, Greek Civil War
- Awards: Order of the Redeemer; Commander of the Order of George I Commander of the Order of the Phoenix; Gold Cross of Valour; War Cross (1916-17 variant); Medal of Military Merit
- Spouse: Aristea Toliopoulou
- Children: Stamatios; Maria

Georgios Stanotas (Greek: Γεώργιος Στανωτάς; January 1, 1888 – 1965) was a Greek cavalry officer who rose to the rank of lieutenant general.

== Early life and career ==
He was born on 1 January 1888 in the village of Kastanitsa, in the Peloponnese. He left his village and went to Athens, where, on 6 December 1909, he joined the Hellenic Army as a simple trooper in the 2nd Cavalry Regiment. He was an excellent rider, intelligent and bold, and soon he was promoted to non-commissioned officer.

With the rank of senior sergeant, he participated in the First Balkan War of 1912–1913, fighting in the battles of Sarantaporo, Yenidje, Ostrovo, the capture of Korytsa, and the Battle of Bizani. During the Second Balkan War against Bulgaria he was promoted to warrant officer, fighting in the battles of Kilkis–Lachanas, Beles, and Kresna.

On 28 February 1914, he entered and graduated from the NCO Academy and was promoted to second lieutenant of cavalry on 25 March. In 1917 he was promoted to captain, but as an avowed monarchist, was suspended from the army for 6 months after the ousting of King Constantine I during the National Schism.

In the Greco-Turkish War of 1919-1922, he commanded the 4th Company of the 3rd Cavalry Regiment from 21 January 1920. He distinguished himself for his bravery, receiving the War Cross 2nd Class, and nominated for a battlefield promotion. Although this did not materialize, by June 1921, he was given command of a cavalry battalion. He was promoted to major in 1923. Although in the military, in 1924 he enrolled into Athens University in the Pharmaceutics department.

In 1927 he was promoted to lieutenant colonel and was appointed as Cavalry Application School commander, while in August 1929 he took command of the 3rd Cavalry Regiment in Larissa. In the following year, he was promoted to colonel and in 1933 he took command of a cavalry brigade. He was promoted to major general on 20 December 1938 and was appointed as CO of the Cavalry Division in Thessaloniki in 1939.

== Second World War and after ==
In the Greco-Italian War of 1940, the Cavalry Division achieved the first great victory in the Battle of Pindus, being instrumental in the defeat of the elite Italian Julia Alpine Division. In the spring of 1941, Stanotas with the Cavalry Division fought against the invading Germans in West Macedonia, next to the rest of the Allied Forces. His combat achievements gave him a great reputation among his colleagues.

In 1943, he escaped from occupied Greece and through Turkey and Lebanon, he arrived in Cairo, where he joined the Greek Armed Forces in exile. There he was appointed as Inspector General of the Army. He retired in January 1945, after the liberation of Greece.

In 1947, when Greece was in the middle of the Greek Civil War, he was recalled to duty and was appointed as Commanding General of the Peloponnese. His experience allowed him to organize successful sweep operations and to destroy the main strongholds of the Communist led Democratic Army of Greece there.

He retired on 30 March 1948, and received the honorary rank of lieutenant general. He was recalled to service on 7 October 1949, and finally retired on 28 February 1950.

== Personal life ==
He was married to Aristea Toliopoulou and had a son Stamatios and a daughter Maria. After his retirement, he played a pioneering role in the plastics industry in Greece.

He died on 27 September 1965.

== Sources ==
- (in Greek) Notaridis, Christos "ΕΝΑΣ ΠΙΣΤΟΣ ΚΑΙ ΦΙΛΟΤΙΜΟΣ ΣΤΡΑΤΙΩΤΗΣ" (A Loyal and Dutiful Soldier), Biography of General Stanotas, ISBN 978-960-522-335-9, PELASGOS Publ. Athens 2013, https://www.e-shop.gr/show_bks.phtml?id=BKS.0458152
- (in Greek) Papagos, Alexandros "The Battle of Greece 1940–1941" Athens 1949: J.M. Scazikis “Alpha”, editions. ASIN B0007J4DRU.
- (in Greek) Hellenic Army History Directorate, Concise History of Greek-Italian and Greek-German War 1940-1941, Athens 1985.
- (in Greek) Hellenic Army Publications Division, Selected Military History Articles, 1981.
- (in Greek) Papyros-Larousse-Britannica Encyclopedia, Greek version, volume 55.
- (in Greek) Pantelis Karykas, The Greek Cavalry stops the Italian Blitzkrieg, article published in the War and History magazine, April 2006.
- (in Greek) Crushing "Julia", article published in the Military History magazine, October 2004.
- (in Greek) Konstantinos Papadimitriou, The battle of lake Kastoria, article published in the Military History magazine, July 2008.
- (in Greek) Military record file of General Stanotas, archived in the Greek Military Archives Service (YSA).
