= Nikolaos Makris =

Greek politician and soldier

- Νικόλαος Μακρής
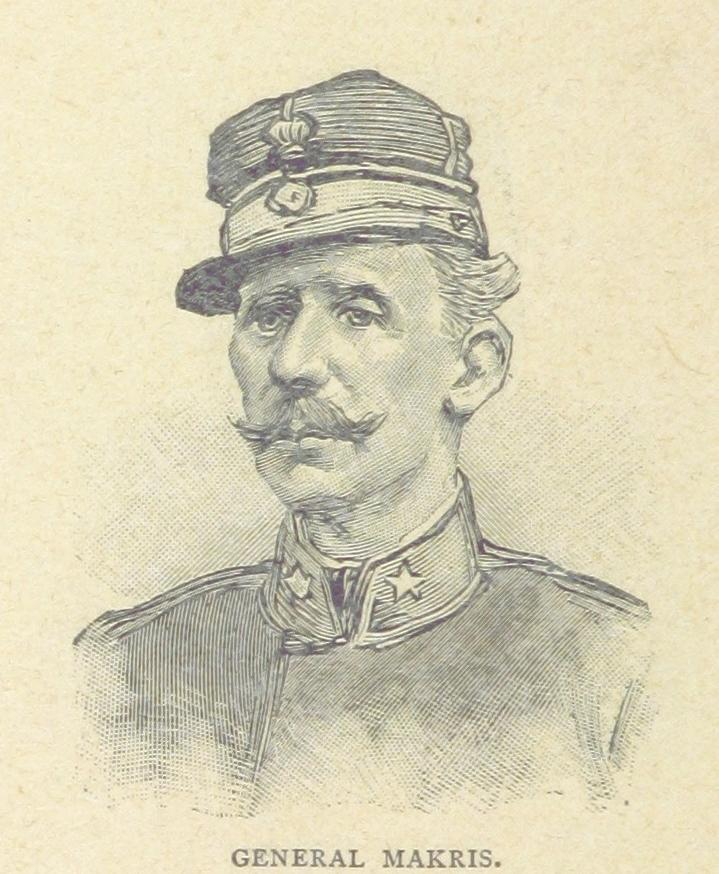
- Nikolaos Makris c. 1899

Member of Parliament for Aetolia-Acarnania
- In office ? – 13 January 1911
- Monarch: George I
- Prime Minister: Eleftherios Venizelos

Personal details
- Born: 1829 Missolonghi, First Hellenic Republic
- Died: 13 January 1911 (aged 81–82) Kingdom of Greece
- Parent: Dimitrios Makris

Military service
- Allegiance: Kingdom of Greece; Kingdom of Sardinia
- Branch/service: Hellenic Army; Royal Sardinian Army
- Rank: Major General
- Commands: Athens Police; Hellenic Gendarmerie; Army of Thessaly; 1st Infantry Division
- Battles/wars: Wars of Italian Unification; Second Italian War of Independence; Greco-Turkish War (1897); Battle of Domokos

Nikolaos Makris (Greek: Νικόλαος Μακρής, 1829–1911) was a Hellenic Army General and politician.

Nikolaos Makris was born in Missolonghi in 1829. He was the son of Dimitrios Makris, a military leader during the Greek War of Independence of 1821. He entered the Hellenic Army and was sent to France for training. After his return, he served in various command and staff positions, and eventually commanded the Athens police and became head of the Hellenic Gendarmerie.

He participated in the Greco-Turkish War of 1897 as commander of the 1st Infantry Division.

After the war, he left the army with the rank of Major General. He was elected MP for his native prefecture of Aetolia-Acarnania several times.
