= Vasileios Vrachnos =

Greek politician (1887–1971)

Lieutenant General Vasileios Vrachnos
- Βασίλειος Βραχνός
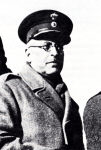
- Vrachnos c. 1940
- Born: c. 1887; Nafplio, Kingdom of Greece
- Died: c. 1971; Athens, Kingdom of Greece
- Alma mater: National and Kapodistrian University of Athens
- Military career
- Allegiance: Kingdom of Greece; (Greece) Second Hellenic Republic
- Branch: Hellenic Army
- Service years: 1907–1941; 1945–1948
- Rank: Lieutenant General
- Commands: 1st Infantry Division
- Wars: Balkan Wars: First Balkan War; Second Balkan War; World War I: Macedonian front; Greco-Turkish War (1919–22); World War II: Greco-Italian War; Battle of Pindus; Battle of Greece
- Awards: Order of the Redeemer; Grand Cross of the Order of George I Order of the Phoenix; Gold Cross of Valour (twice); War Cross (1916-17 and 1940 variant); Medal of Military Merit
- Other work: Member of Parliament; Deputy Minister for the Interior

Vasileios Vrachnos (Greek: Βασίλειος Βραχνός; 1887–1971) was a Hellenic Army General, most notable for his leadership in the Greco-Italian War of 1940–41, and post-war conservative politician.

== Biography ==
He was born in Nafplio in 1887. After studying law at the University of Athens, he enlisted in the Hellenic Army and participated in the Balkan Wars, World War I, and the Asia Minor Campaign.

At the outbreak of the Greco-Italian War on 28 October 1940 he was Major General commanding the 1st Infantry Division, with which he played a major role in the Greek victory in the Battle of Pindus. During the Axis occupation of Greece, he was arrested and imprisoned in Italy and Germany, being released in 1945. Reinstated in the Army, he was promoted to Lieutenant General in 1946, before retiring in 1948. He was elected an MP in 1951 and 1952.

He was also briefly Deputy Minister of the Interior from 16 April to 15 December 1954 in the National Radical Union cabinet of Alexander Papagos, the former Greek commander-in-chief in 1940–41.

He died in Athens in 1971.
