= Armatoles =

Irregular men at arms appointed as Ottoman authority personnel

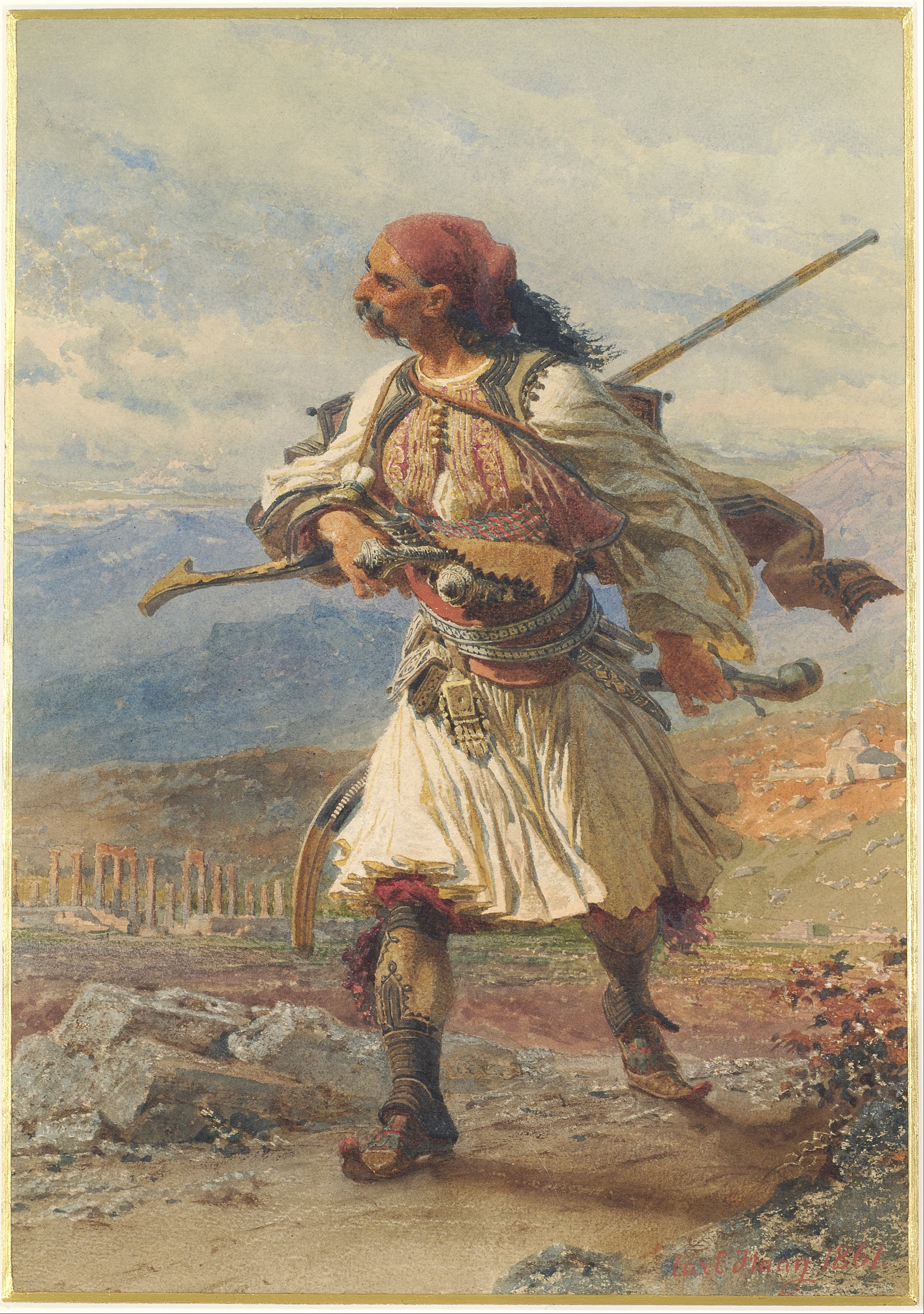
Watercolor painting by Carl Haag (1861) conceivably representing an armatole.

The armatoles (Greek: αρματολοί, romanized: armatoloi; Albanian: armatolë; Aromanian: armatoli; Bosnian: armatoli), or armatole in singular, were irregular soldiers, or militia, commissioned by the Ottomans to enforce the sultan's authority within an administrative district called an armatoliki (αρματολίκι in singular, αρματολίκια, armatolikia in plural). In Greek regions of the Ottoman Empire, they were composed of Greeks who were either former klephts or village stalwarts who had taken up arms against the klephts in the defense of their district.

The Greek armatoles had a semi-independent status all over the Greek peninsula, and armatolikia were created in areas that had high levels of brigandage (i.e. klephts), or in regions that were difficult for Ottoman authorities to govern due to the inaccessible terrain, such as the Agrafa mountains of Thessaly, where the first armatoliki was established in the 15th century. Over time, the roles of the armatoles and klephtes became blurred, with both reversing their roles and allegiances as the situation demanded, all the while maintaining the delicate status-quo with the Ottoman authorities. They were armed men who were enforcing the law according to their desires with the force of their guns, armata, since the authority of the Ottoman Empire was very limited in the areas that they were acting, as the Ottoman Empire where the armatoles were present was a failed state. Albanian armatoles were employed by Ottoman authorities, and in particular in the latter half of the 18th century, during the administration of the Ottoman Albanian ruler Ali Pasha of the increasingly independent Pashalik of Yanina he replaced Greek armatoles, making the regions armatoles almost exclusively Albanian. The thus deposed Greek armatoles became klephts and their subsequent anti-armatoloi activity was not only brigandage, but also a form of resistance against Ottoman rule.

During the Greek War of Independence, the Greek armatoles, along with the klephts, formed the nucleus of the Greek fighting forces, and played a prominent part throughout its duration. Yannis Makriyannis referred to them and klephts as the "yeast of liberty" (μαγιά της λευτεριάς). Despite being ineffective, they were the only viable military force for the provisional governments of the 1821-1827 period. During that time period, three attempts were made at creating a regular army, and one of the reasons for their failure was the resistance of the klepht and armatoles leaders. Their motive to fight the Ottomans was more personal gain than national aspirations; they were not aware of national projects, made alliances with the Ottomans and robbed Christians as much as Muslims.

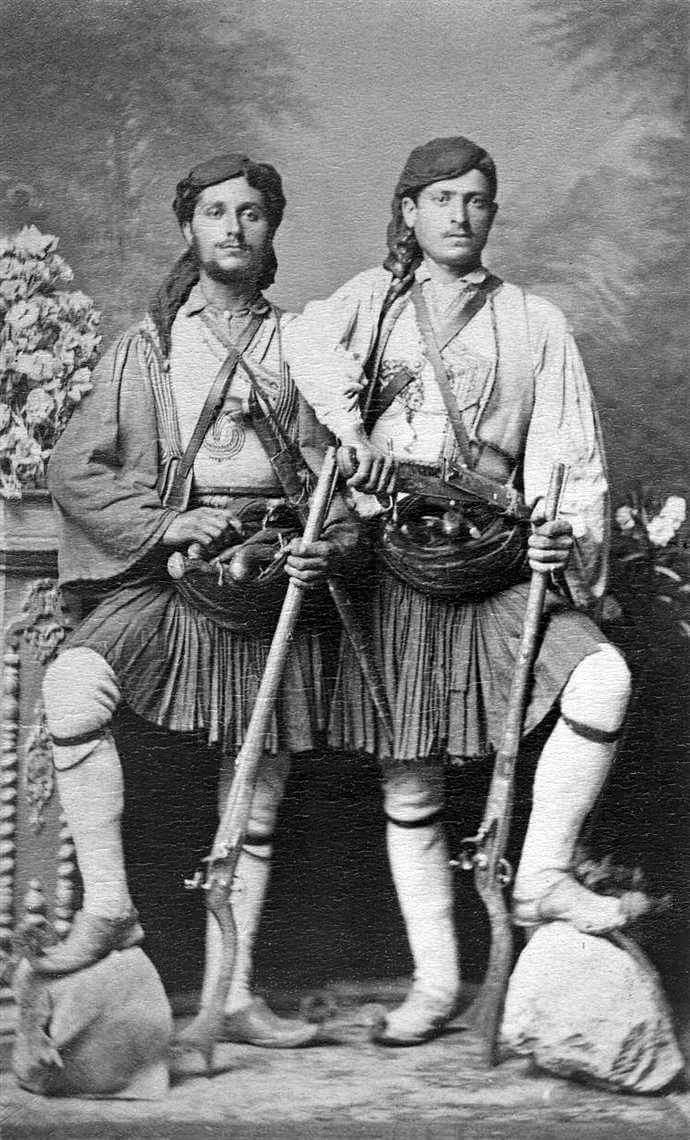
Greek Armotoles wearing traditional fustanella with Kariophili Flintlock muskets, sabers, flintlock pistols

There were also some Bosnian armatoles, who were drawn from the local Muslim populations, as well as some Aromanian armatoles, many of whom cooperated with pro-Bulgarian komitadjis. There also were Megleno-Romanian armatoles.

== Etymology ==
The word "armatole" first appeared in the 15th century during Venetian times. It is derived from a medieval loan from Latin arma ('weapon'), probably via Greek αρματολόγος ('someone who deals with arms', 'an armed person') → αρματολόος → αρματολός. According to an older hypothesis, the development of the word may also have been influenced by a conflation with the similar-sounding αμαρτωλός ("sinner"; cf. hamartia), which may have been associated with the topic of armed bands through phrases such as "αμαρτωλοί/αρματολοί και κλέφτες" (meaning "sinners and thieves", but also "armatoles and klephts"). Owing to the parallelism with "αμαρτωλός", the word was also sometimes spelled as "αρματωλός", with the letter omega.

== Origins and structure ==
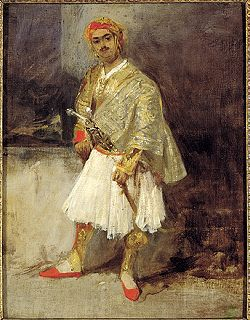
Greek armatole by Richard Parkes Bonington, 1825-6.

The military/police organization of the armatoles, known as armatolismos, has its origins in the Byzantine period of Greek history. Armatolismos was a type of feudalism where police and military functions were provided in exchange for titles of land. As an institution, the armatoles first appear in Agrafa, Thessaly during the reign of Sultan Murad II (r. 1421–1451). From there, they spread to other parts of Greece except the Peloponnese.

Administrative districts known as armatolikia were created in areas of Greece that had high levels of brigandage (i.e. klephts), or in regions that were difficult for Ottoman authorities to govern due to the inaccessible terrain. An armatoliki was commanded by a kapetanios often a former klepht captain who had been hired by the governing Ottoman pasha to combat, or at least contain, brigand groups operating in the region. In most cases, the captain would have gained a level of notoriety as a klepht to force the Ottomans to give him amnesty and the privileges that came with an armatoliki. Therefore, it was not surprising that armatole units were organised in very much the same way as the klephts, with a captain assisted by a lieutenant called a protopalikaro, who was usually a kinsman, and the remaining force made up of armatoles. Many captains ran their armatolikia like their personal fiefdoms, exacting a heavy toll of extortion and violence on the local peasantry.

== Greek armatoles ==
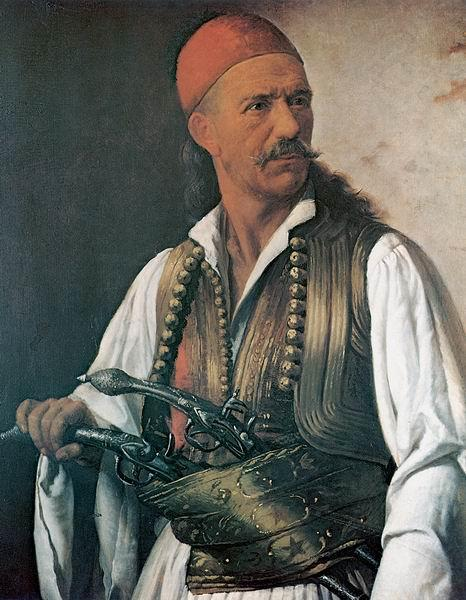
Dimitrios Makris (c. 1772–1841), a Greek armatole of the 19th century.

As mentioned earlier, the armatoles were organized based on a feudal system under which they maintained their military/police duties in exchange for titles of land. When the Ottomans conquered Greece in the 15th century, they established treaties with the armatoles in order for them to maintain their military/police functions. The Ottomans would have units of armatoles or kapetanioi (καπετάνιοι, captains) function as peace-keepers in territories near difficult terrain (i.e. mountain passes) or in areas where resistance to foreign rule entailed acts of theft by the klephts. Most armatoles were former klephts who had received amnesty. They were chosen with agreement between the local pasha and Muslim and Christian community representatives (local primates). They were paid by the local people, and made use of force to collect taxes. This caused conflicts between the armatoles and community representatives. There were also instances of collaboration between them to exterminate rival factions.

The armatoles were mostly concentrated in Macedonia, Thessaly, Epirus, Acarnania, and Aetolia (specifically Agrafa). In the Peloponnese, armatolismos did not develop in the same manner as it did in Roumeli and Epirus. In the Peloponnese, the kapoi (κάποι) and the meintanides (μεϊντάνηδες) were similar to the armatoles. If in certain regions, the institution of armatolismos was not implemented, the territories were divided into armatolikia (αρματολίκια) or protakta (προτάκτα). These territories extended from the Axios River (Αξιός) to the Ambracian Gulf (Αμβρακικός) and up to the Corinthian Gulf (Κορινθιακός). The kapetanioi would often have authority over these territories via inheritance/succession. A single kapetanio was at first forced to submit his authority to the pasha who controlled the periphery. Later, all kapetanioi were forced to submit to Dervedji pasha (Δερβετζή πασά).

During the 18th century, there were around seventeen armatolikia. Ten of them were located in Thessaly and the eastern regions of Central Greece, four of them in Epirus, Acarnania, and Aetolia, and three in Macedonia. Every kapetanio had his rank-and-file soldiers known as palikaria (παλικάρια, from ancient Greek pallix) and section leaders among these palikaria were known as protopalikara (πρωτοπαλίκαρα). The palikaria would train with their weapons on a daily basis.

The main weapon the palikaria utilized was the kariofili (καριοφίλι). Marksmanship was the proverbial hallmark that defined the palikaria. They were also highly mobile and capable at conducting ambushes. The palikaria were resilient toward thirst, hunger and even the painful difficulties in their encounters with the klephts.

The term klephtopolemos (κλεφτοπόλεμος) was used to name the strategies/tactics that both the klephts and armatoles utilized. These tactics are used today for unconventional military campaigns by small guerrilla groups. The armatoles would conduct campaigns during nighttime. This strategy was known as "going out to pagana" (έβγαιναν στην παγάνα). The armatoles would usually do this when the klephts were coming out of their dens. The armatoles would defend themselves in improvised forts (called meterizia; μετερίζια) against the guerrilla tactics utilized by the klephts (specifically known as klephtouria; κλεφτουριά). A general offensive campaign by the armatoles was known as giourousi (γιουρούσι). During one of these campaigns, the armatoles would make effective use of swords and war cries.

=== Greek War of Independence ===
During the 1810-1820 decade the Greek armatoles largely depended on the support they enjoyed from the Ottoman Albanian ruler Ali Pasha of the increasingly independent Pashalik of Yanina. Because of that they had little influence from the Greek nationalist organization Filiki Eteria and had reservations about participating at the Greek War of Independence. This changed after Ali Pasha died and their future became less certain. Most of the Armatoles had learned their military skills among the Christian Albanian Souliotes and other Albanian groups who had a renowned tradition in irregular warfare. The klephts and armatoles played a key role during the Greek War of Independence. Despite being ineffective, they were the only viable military force for the provisional governments of the 1821-1827 period. During that time period, three attempts were made at creating a regular army, and one of the reasons for their failure was the resistance of the klepht and armatoles leaders. Among armatoles leaders were Odysseas Androutsos, Georgios Karaiskakis, Athanasios Diakos, Markos Botsaris and Giannis Stathas.

Contrary to conventional Greek history, many of the klephts and armatoles participated at the Greek War of Independence according to their own militaristic patron-client terms. They saw the war as an economic and political opportunity to expand their areas of operation. Balkan bandits such as the klephts and armatoles - glorified in nationalist historiography as national heroes - were actually driven by economic interests, were not aware of national projects, made alliances with the Ottomans and robbed Christians as much as Muslims.

== Albanian armatoles ==
Albanian armatoles were employed by the Ottoman authorities. During the Austro-Turkish War (1716–1718), an Albanian armatole-like private militia caused trouble in Kavala, resulting in its abolition by Ahmed III in 1721; however, it continued to exist illegally for another 100 years. Christian Albanian Souliots and other Albanian warrior groups with a renowned tradition in irregular warfare imbued most of armatoles with their military art.

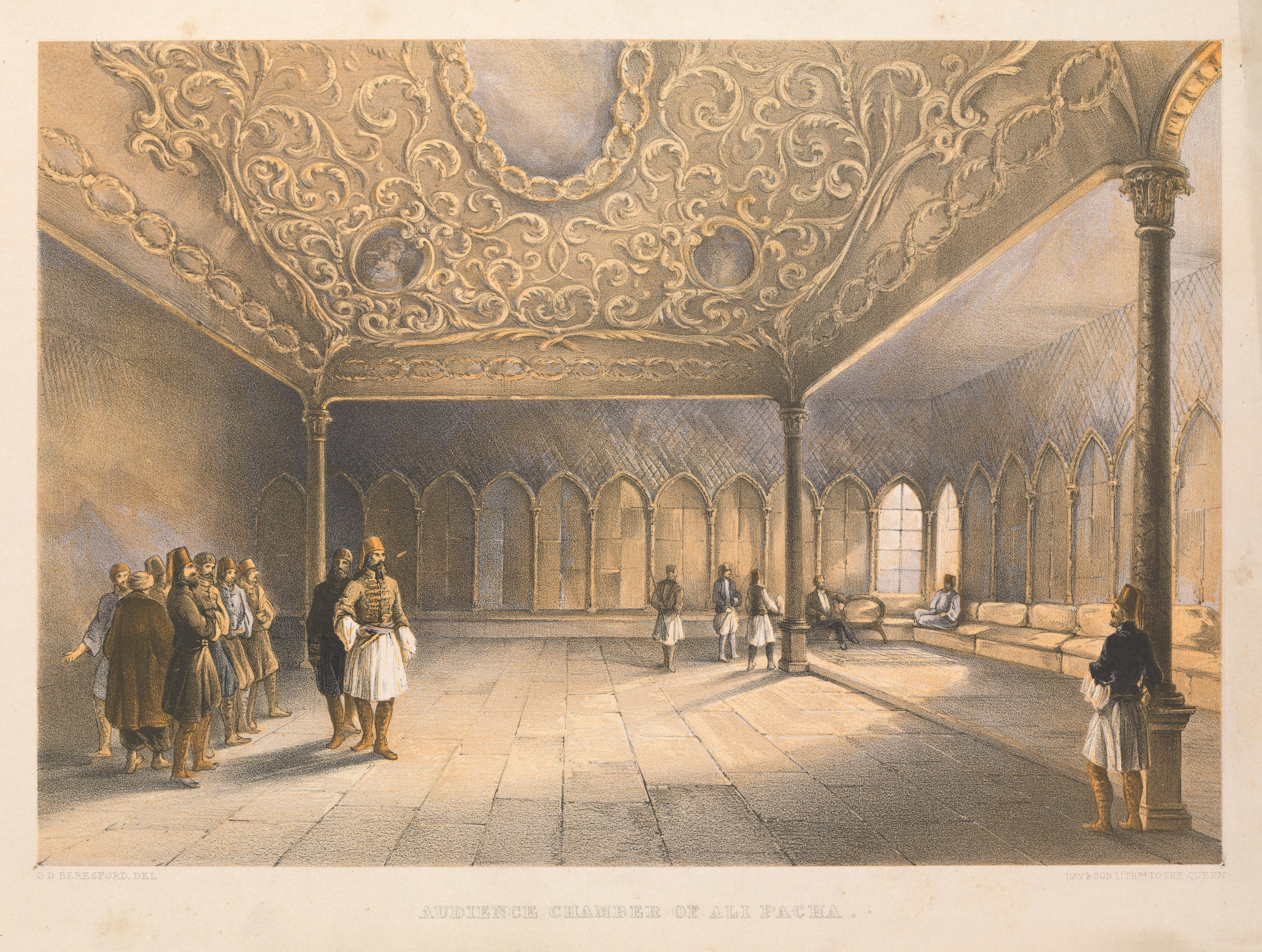
Audience chamber of Ali Pacha, lithograph by George de la Poer Beresford, 1855.

Albanian armatoles were employed by Ottoman authorities, in particular in the latter half of the 18th century. During the administration of the Ottoman Albanian ruler Ali Pasha of the increasingly independent Pashalik of Yanina the Greek armatoles where replaced by Albanians, making the region's armatoles almost exclusively Albanian. The deposed Greek armatoles became klephts and their subsequent activity was not only brigandage, but also a form of resistance against Ottoman rule.

Ali Pasha appointed under his direct authority a number of armatoloi and klephts who were loyal to him, and who were employed as his own military troops in Yanina and in territories under his administration. The defeat of Ali Pasha by the Ottoman Empire in 1820 and the subsequent outbreak of the Greek revolution generated a vacuum of power in the region, especially until 1823. Initially the armatoloi who formerly fought for Ali Pasha tried to preserve their independence and military leadership, but when their areas of control came under the authority of the Greek revolutionary leadership, they tried to keep their power in this new context.

Ali Pasha positioned the Greek-Arvanite Odysseas Androutsos as armatolos of Livadeia in eastern central Greece in 1816. In 1818 Androutsos became a member of the Filiki Eteria with Athanasios Diakos, an organisation that aimed at the independence of Greece, and with the defeat of Ali Pasha Androutsos joined the Greek revolutionary army. In 1825 he permanentrly changed allegiances and joined the army of the Ottoman Albanian ruler Omer Vrioni, Pasha of Yanina, and thereafter he was captured and executed by the Greek revolutionaries.

== Other armatoles ==
=== Aromanian armatoles ===
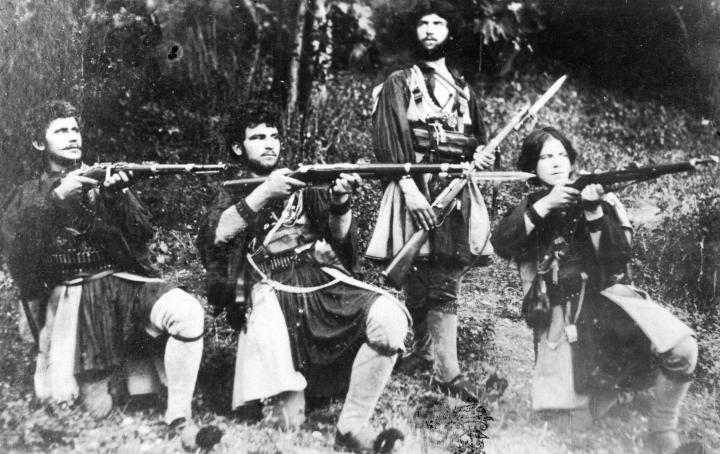
Cola Nicea (leftmost person), an Aromanian armatole, and his band in 1907 in Veria. Photograph by the Manaki brothers.

There also were ethnic Aromanian armatole fighters. Many of these often engaged in cooperation with pro-Bulgarian komitadjis such as the Secret Macedo-Adrianopolitan Revolutionary Organization (TMORO).

=== Bosnian armatoles ===
In Bosnia, armatoles were largely drawn from the local Muslim populations. According to documents, in 1485-1490 these Bosnian armatoles were tasked with guarding the Turkish forts on the shores of Dalmatia which sustained attacks from the Venetians.

=== Megleno-Romanian armatoles ===
Traian Cucuda, a Megleno-Romanian, was a relevant armatole voivode at his time.

== Famous armatoles ==
=== Souliots ===
- Markos Botsaris
- Kitsos Tzavelas

=== Greek-Albanian ===
- Odysseas Androutsos

=== Aromanians ===
- George Ceara
- Ioryi Mucitano
- Cola Nicea
- Giorgakis Olympios

=== Greeks ===
- Athanasios Diakos
- Georgios Karaiskakis
- Giannis Stathas

== See also ==
- Hajduk
