= Battle of Pindus =

Battle in the Pindus Mountains in 1940

- Part of the Greco-Italian War
- Italian Invasion of Greece 1940
Date	28 October – 13 November 1940 (2 weeks and 2 days)
Location	Pindus Mountains 40°05′20″N 20°55′31″E
Result	Greek victory

Belligerents
Italy	Greece

Commanders and leaders
(Kingdom of Italy) Mario Girotti	(Kingdom of Greece) Konstantinos Davakis (Kingdom of Greece) Vasileios Vrachnos (Kingdom of Greece) Georgios Stanotas (Kingdom of Greece) Sokratis Dimaratos

Strength
28 October: 3rd Alpine Division "Julia" elements 47th Infantry Division "Bari"; Julia: 10,804 officers and men 20 guns mid-November: 23,000 men 112 guns	28 October: 2,000 men 4 guns 13 November: 32,000 men 114 guns

Casualties and losses
5,000 killed, wounded and missing	Unknown

The Battle of Pindus took place in the Pindus Mountains in Epirus and West Macedonia, Greece, from 28 October – 13 November 1940. The battle was fought between the Greek and the Italian armies during the first stages of the Greco-Italian War. The elite Italian 3rd Alpine Division "Julia" invaded Greece from the Pindus sector. After its initial advance, the division was surrounded by the Greek army and forced to retreat after suffering heavy losses. In the aftermath, the Greeks were able to push back the Italians, advancing deep into Albanian territory.

== Background ==
After the Italian invasion of Albania in 1939, the Greek General Staff became alerted to a potential Italian attack from Albanian territory, which eventually started on 28 October 1940. The Italian command deployed the Julia Division with the objective of capturing the strategic mountain passes of the Pindus Mountains as swiftly as possible. During an Italian war council, the Italian commander in Albania, General Visconti Prasca, stated that the mountain range of Pindus would be no problem for the Italian units, and foresaw no difficulty in getting his divisions straight to Athens, like a modern Hannibal. The Greeks divided the theatre of operations into the sectors of Epirus and Macedonia linked by the Pindus Detachment. The Pindus Detachment under Colonel Konstantinos Davakis was deployed along a 35-kilometre (22 mi) line in the Pindus mountain range.

== Battle ==
The primary objective of the Julia Division was to advance towards the Pindus mountain range and to capture the strategic pass at the town of Metsovo. This move would have a crucial effect on the outcome of the battle, since it would break the Greek supply lines and separate the Greek forces in Epirus from those in Macedonia. The Julia managed to cover 40 kilometres (25 mi) of mountain terrain in icy rain and captured the village of Vovousa, but were unable to reach Metsovo. On 2 November, Davakis was gravely wounded during a reconnaissance mission near Fourka. However, it had become clear to the Italians that they lacked the manpower and the supplies to continue in the face of the arriving Greek reserves.

On 3 November, the Italian spearhead, after the initial advance, was surrounded from all sides. The commander of the Julia requested from the Italian headquarters relief attacks and Italian reserves were thrown into the battle. However, reinforcements from Albania were unable to reach the cut-off Italian forces and the Julia sustained heavy losses. In the meantime, Greek reinforcements were arriving in the Pindus sector, while the assistance of the local population, including men, women, and children, was invaluable. The situation became difficult for the Italians and their pocket came under pressure from Greek units that had advanced to the area.

The Julia was eventually able to break out of the encirclement, but lost about one fifth of its force and retreated to Koritsa. The villages that had been initially captured during the Italian advance—Samarina and Vovousa—were recaptured by the advancing Greek forces on November 3–4. Within less than a week, the remaining Italian troops were pushed back into roughly the same positions they occupied along the frontier before the declaration of the war.

By 13 November, the entire frontier area had been cleared of Italian units, thereby ending the Battle of Pindus in a complete Greek victory. Highly significant for Greek success was the failure of the Regia Aeronautica to attack and disrupt the mobilization and the deployment of the Greek forces as they moved to the front. Due to this failure to interdict movement, the geographical and technical obstacles faced by the Greeks in transporting men and material in the mountainous terrain to the front lines proved surmountable.

== Aftermath ==
As a result of the failed invasion, the Italians lost 5,000 men. After the successful Greek defence in Pindus and Elea–Kalamas sectors, the Greeks were able to push back the Italians, advancing deep into Albanian territory. It has been argued that the assistance provided by the local women during the conflicts was crucial to the outcome of the battle. The women of the surrounding villages assisted the Greek forces in several ways, while their most important contribution was the transportation of guns, food, clothes and other important supplies to the front, since vehicles could not reach the battlegrounds due to bad weather conditions and rough roads.

== Legacy ==
The war film I trecento della Settima was a propaganda film directed by Mario Baffico that depicts the Greeks as the "bad" people that attack the Italian forces who defend a strategic point. It resembles the Italians alpinists as the "300" of Leonidas, and the Greeks as the mighty and cowardly army of Xerxes.
