= Battle of Trebeshina =

1941 battle of the Greco-Italian War

- Part of the Greco-Italian War
- Greek offensive 1940–1941 in Northern Epirus
Date	29 January – 17 February 1941 (2 weeks and 5 days)
Location	Mount Trebeshinë, Albania 40°20′32″N 20°06′19″E
Result	Greek victory

Belligerents
Greece	Italy

Commanders and leaders
(Kingdom of Greece) Dimitrios Papadopoulos	(Kingdom of Italy) Carlo Rossi

Strength
(Kingdom of Greece) 6th Infantry Regiment (Kingdom of Greece) 5th Cretan Division	Unknown

Casualties and losses
5,776 (Cretan Division)	

The Battle of Trebeshina (Greek: Μάχη της Τρεμπεσίνας) or the Battle of Mal Trebeshinë was a series of engagements fought between the Greek and Italian armies in southeastern Albania during the Greco-Italian War. The twenty-day battle was fought on the strategic heights that make up the 26-kilometre-long (16 mi) Trebeshinë mountain range, notably Height 1923.

== Prelude ==
Following the Greek capture of the strategic Këlcyrë/Klisura Pass on 10 January 1941, caused concerns in the Italian command because the loss of Berat could lead to the devastating scenario of the Italian army line being split into two. Four Italian divisions and one Blackshirt division of the Italian XXV Army Corps under General Carlo Rossi attempted to recover the Trebeshinë mountain range by launching counter-attacks against the Greek II Army Corps (1st, 15th, and 11th Infantry Divisions).

== Battle ==
On 27 January, the Greek III/4 Battalion under Major Ioannis Baldoumis captured Height 1923 and set up defensive positions in deep snow, while the I/5 Battalion under the command of Major Antonios Goulas captured Height 1620. Due to heavy snow and blizzards, the Greeks were soon forced to abandon Trebeshina, which was subsequently occupied by two Italian Blackshirt battalions.

II Corps, reinforced with the Cretan 5th Division from III Corps, repulsed the Italian attack by 29 January and then attacked towards the Trebeshina massif. On the same day, the Greek Prime Minister Ioannis Metaxas died from an infection and was replaced by Alexandros Koryzis. Metaxas's death damaged the morale of the Greek troops. Against stiff resistance, the Cretan Division captured Trebeshina on 2 February, and the 15th Division captured the village of Bubeshi. On 14 February 1941, the 6th Infantry Regiment of the 3rd Division, under Colonel Ioannis Theodorou, repelled an Italian attack on the Skutara line near Height 504. The attack aimed to dislodge the Greek defensive line in the coastal sector, near the Albanian port city of Vlorë. The Greeks suffered 109 killed and wounded in the engagement.

On 13 February, the Cretan Division broke through the Trebeshina massif, capturing the Maricaj Heights; however, their offensive was halted by the bad weather on 18 February. It was a costly victory, particularly for the Cretan Division, which suffered 5,776 killed, wounded, or missing and had ceased to exist as a combat-worthy formation. The Greek positions at Trebeshina were subject to the main attack of Operazione Primavera during the Italian Spring Offensive in early March, but were held until the Greek withdrawal south following the German invasion of Greece on 6 April.

== Sources ==
- Battistelli, Pier P. (2021). Bogdanovic, Nikolai (ed.). The Balkans 1940–41: Mussolini's Fatal Blunder in the Greco-Italian War. Vol. 358. Bloomsbury Publishing. ISBN 9781472842558.
- Carrier, Richard (2021). Mussolini's Army Against Greece October 1940–April 1941. Taylor & Francis. ISBN 9780429015328.
- "Battle of Trebeshina". history-maps.com.
