= 8th Infantry Division (Greece) =

- VIII Μεραρχία Πεζικού (VIII ΜΠ)
- Camp Flag of the 8th Infantry Division
- Active: 1913-1941; 1946-2013
- Country: Greece
- Branch: Hellenic Army
- Type: Infantry
- Size: Division
- Part of: III Army Corps
- Garrison/HQ: Ioannina, Epirus
- Mottos: ΟΧΙ "NO"
- Engagements: Balkan Wars: First Balkan War; Battle of Bizani; Second Balkan War; World War II: Greco-Italian War; Battle of Elaia–Kalamas; Battle of Greece

Commanders
- Notable commanders: Dimitrios Matthaiopoulos; Charalambos Katsimitros

The 8th Infantry Division (Greek: VIII Μεραρχία Πεζικού, VIII ΜΠ; VIII Merarchia Pezikou, VIII MP) was an infantry division of the Hellenic Army.

Active since the Balkan Wars, the division is most notable for its decisive role during the first days of the Greco-Italian War, when it successfully stopped the initial Italian offensive, and bought time for Greek reinforcements to arrive and turn the tide.

In a wide-ranging army reorganization in 2013, the division was reduced in size to a brigade-level formation - the 8th Motorized Infantry Brigade.

== History ==
=== Balkan Wars, World War I, and Greco-Turkish War ===
The 8th Infantry Division, initially named the Epirus Division (Greek: Μεραρχία Ηπείρου; Merarchia Ipeirou), was formed on 22 September 1912, during the First Balkan War, under the command of Major General Dimitrios Matthaiopoulos. On 22 January 1913 it was renamed as the 8th Infantry Division. Its component units were the 15th Infantry Regiment, the 2nd Evzones Regiment and the Independent Cretan Regiment.

It participated in the operations for the capture of Ioannina and the subsequent push into Northern Epirus, capturing Këlcyrë, Argyrokastro, Tepelenë, and Përmet. In June 1913 it was moved to Thessaloniki, and participated in the Second Balkan War against Bulgaria, capturing Paranesti, Xanthi, and Komotini. It remained on occupation duties in Western Thrace until the signing of the Treaty of Bucharest. In December it was placed on garrison duties, with its regiments dispersed at Preveza, Corfu and Lefkada.

The division was re-established in July 1917 and remained in Epirus as the local garrison. It did not fight in the Macedonian front, nor in the Asia Minor Campaign, except for its 15th Infantry Regiment. Its subordinate units throughout the subsequent interwar period were: the 15th Infantry Regiment at Ioannina, the 10th Infantry Regiment at Corfu, the 24th Infantry Regiment, and the 3/40 Evzone Regiment at Preveza and later Arta.

=== Greco-Italian War ===
Since 1930, the division bore sole responsibility for the defense of the Epirus sector of the Greco-Albanian border. Due to the relative military weakness of Albania, the sector was "quiet" and far less vital than the border with Bulgaria. This changed in April 1939, when Fascist Italy invaded and occupied Albania. Under its commander, Maj Gen Charalambos Katsimitros, the division engaged in a feverish activity of constructing fortifications and laying out defensive plans. With the Italian invasion looming from August 1940 onwards, a limited mobilization was carried out, which brought the division up to strength and even allowed for the reconstitution of the 24th Regiment as a separate unit. This fact, combined with Katsimitros' decision to insist on forward defense, would prove decisive factors in the rapid containment of the initial Italian main thrust into Epirus. The division was deployed in a defensive position stretching from the village of Elaia (Kalpaki) to the line of the river Kalamas, and for six days, from November 2 to November 8, successfully repelled the successive attacks by the Italian Ciamura Army Corps. By that point, the mobilization of the Greek reserves had been completed, and in conjunction with the Greek victory in the Battle of Pindus, the division's victory at the Battle of Elaia–Kalamas signalled the failure of the Italian attack.

The division fought throughout the subsequent Albanian campaign, but was dissolved along with the rest of the Greek Army after the German invasion in April 1941. During the Axis occupation of Greece, the ELAS partisan army created an 8th Division, but this too was disbanded in early 1945.

=== Greek Civil War ===
The 8th Division was formally reconstituted only in 1946, as the Hellenic Army started being rebuilt, from the forces of the Epirus Military Command, comprising the 74th, 75th and 76th brigades. Until 1949, the division took part in the operations of the Greek Civil War as a part of the governmental National Army.

== Emblem and Motto ==
The emblem the 8th Infantry Division is a bull within an oak wreath, taken from 3rd-century BC coins of the Epirote League.

The division's motto is OXI (pronounced "óchi"), or "NO". The phrase was attributed to the Prime Minister of Greece, Ioannis Metaxas, on 28 October 1940, when he was given an ultimatum by Benito Mussolini to allow Italian troops to occupy strategic Greek sites or face war. Metaxas curtly replied in French: "Alors, c'est la guerre" ("Then it is war"). However, according to popular legend, Metaxas simply told the Italian envoy in Greek, "Ohi!" ("No!"). The motto was given to the division in recognition of its decisive role in stopping the Italian advance during the early days of the Greco-Italian War.
