= Dimitrios Papadopoulos (general) =

Hellenic army officer (1889–1983)

- Δημήτριος Παπαδόπουλος
- Born: 27 December 1889; Nafplio, Kingdom of Greece
- Died: 5 December 1983 (aged 93); Athens, Greece
- Burial place: Nafplio
- Education: Hellenic Military Academy
- Military career
- Allegiance: Kingdom of Greece; Second Hellenic Republic
- Branch: Hellenic Army
- Service years: 1907–1946
- Rank: Antistratigos (Lieutenant general)
- Wars: Balkan Wars: First Balkan War; Second Balkan War; World War I: Macedonian front; Greco-Turkish War (1919–22); World War II: Greco-Italian War; Battle of Kleisoura Pass; Battle of Trebeshina; Italian Spring Offensive; Battle of Greece; Greek resistance
- Awards: Silver Cross of the Order of the Redeemer; Grand Cross of the Order of George I Gold Cross of Valour (twice); War Cross (1917 variant); Medal for Outstanding Acts; Croix de Guerre (France); Croix de guerre (Belgium)

Dimitrios Papadopoulos (Greek: Δημήτριος Παπαδόπουλος; 27 December 1889 – 5 December 1983) was a Hellenic Army officer who reached the rank of Lieutenant General. He is most notable for his leadership in the Greco-Italian War of 1940–41.

== Life ==
Dimitrios Papadopoulos was born on 15 December 1889 to the military doctor Spyridon Papadopoulos (1853–1930) and his wife Eleni (1857–1949). He was born in Nafplio, where his father was director of the Akronafplia military hospital. He had five siblings, the older brother Ioannis (1887–1913), and the younger brothers Angelos (1893–1973) and Athanasios (1900–1971) and two sisters.

=== Early military career ===
Like his older brother Ioannis, after completing his schools studies Dimitrios entered the Hellenic Military Academy on 10 October 1907, graduating as an Artillery 2nd Lieutenant on 26 June 1912. The Balkan Wars erupted a few months later, and the young artillery officer participated in them as a gun troop leader in the 3rd battery, 1st battalion, of the 2nd Field Artillery Regiment under the command of Colonel Leonidas Paraskevopoulos. During the Battle of Pechovo on 15 July 1913 during the Second Balkan War, his brother Ioannis fell in battle. On 25 September 1913 he was promoted to lieutenant. In 1915 he received the Silver Cross of the Order of the Redeemer (1 January), and was successively promoted to captain 2nd Class (25 March) and Captain 1st Class (5 October). In 1917–18 he fought in the Macedonian front of World War I as commander of a mountain artillery battalion. During the war he was promoted to major (13 December 1917) and received the Greek War Cross, the French Croix de Guerre and the Belgian Croix de Guerre. He also participated in the subsequent Asia Minor Campaign as commander of a field artillery battalion. For his service during the war, he earned the Cross of Valour in Gold.

On 26 August 1923 he was promoted to lieutenant colonel, but was soon implicated in the Leonardopoulos–Gargalidis coup d'état attempt (22 October) against the military-led "revolutionary government". As a result, on 28 November he was dismissed from the Army, and was not rehabilitated until 2 June 1927, when a number of officers removed for political reasons were re-admitted into the armed forces. He was promoted to colonel on 31 December 1927, retroactively dated to 18 September 1925. He attended studies at the Centre for Higher Military Training in Athens, founded and functioning under the auspices of a French military mission and was then sent to France for studies at military academies there. Returning to Greece, as Colonel he served as commander of an artillery regiment, Chief of Artillery to the II Army Corps and head of the Artillery Directorate in the Ministry of Military Affairs. Promoted to major general on 21 March 1934, he served as Chief of Artillery to the Athens-based I Army Corps until 1935. He then held a succession of divisional commands, before being named Inspector of Artillery in 1938. On 30 January 1940 he was promoted to lieutenant general and placed in command of II Army Corps at Larissa.

=== World War II and occupation ===
The Greek counteroffensive (13 November 1940 – 7 April 1941)

With the outbreak of the Greco-Italian War, II Corps under Papadopoulos took position in the central section of the front, initially under Lt. General Ioannis Pitsikas' Western Macedonia Army Section. II Corps participated in the operations to hold the initial Italian offensive and in the Greek counter-offensive, capturing Ersekë and Borovë (21 November). From 30 November, II Corps passed under the direct control of General Headquarters under Lt. General Alexandros Papagos. Përmet was captured on 5 December, the fortified Çorovodë–Vërzhezhe–Dobruzhe line was overcome on 26 December, and the II Corps' offensive culminated in January in the capture of the strategically important Kleisoura pass and the capture of Mount Trebeshinë in early February.

On 14 February 1941, II Corps was placed under the newly constituted Epirus Army Section of Lt. General Markos Drakos. On 4 March, he was awarded the Greek War Cross, 1st Class. In the first days of March, however, even though preparations were under way to face the oncoming great Italian Spring Offensive, a leadership crisis erupted during a conference of the commanding Lieutenant Generals at Athens on March 5. When asked on their opinion regarding the country's stance against the looming German invasion of Greece, Papadopoulos, along with generals Drakos and Georgios Kosmas (I Corps), voiced objections to the presence of a British expeditionary force, which would have been inadequate to defend Greece against the Germans but sufficient to give the Germans a casus belli. Their opposition led to their dismissal on the next day and their retirement on the day after that.

Following the German attack, the capitulation of the Greek army and the Axis occupation of Greece in April, on 20 May 1941 Papadopoulos was reinstated in the army by the new collaborationist government's Minister of Defence, Major General Georgios Bakos, and led the Supreme Military Council that reviewed the war records of the officer corps in respect to awards, promotions etc. On 20 May 1943, he became a founding member of the "Military Hierarchy" (Στρατιωτική Ιεραρχία), a group of generals led by Alexander Papagos that tried to organize the officer corps into the Greek Resistance. The group's activities quickly became known to the Germans, however, and on 20 July the leadership of the organization was arrested and deported to Germany. Of the leading Lieutenant Generals, only Papadopoulos remained at large, although the Germans were aware of his role; as the leader of what was left of the organization, he was placed under constant watch, and possibly served as a bait for other officers who might wish to contact the group. The group survived through the occupation and many of its members came forth to man the Attica Military Command which took over control of Athens and its environs upon the retreat of the German troops in October 1944.

=== Later life and death ===
On 5 March 1945, along with the bulk of the remaining military leadership of the war of 1940–41, Papadopoulos was placed on the inactive list. On 30 October he received the Medal for Outstanding Acts and his second Cross of Valour in Gold. He retired on 13 May 1946. On 4 January 1947 he received the Grand Cross of the Order of George I with Swords, and was awarded a lifelong special pension equal to the pay of an active Lt. General.

Papadopoulos spent the remainder of his life retired from public life, until his death in Athens on 5 December 1983. He was buried at his home town of Nafplio. Although married, he died childless.
