= Larnaca Municipal Band =

Marching band and wind band in Cyprus

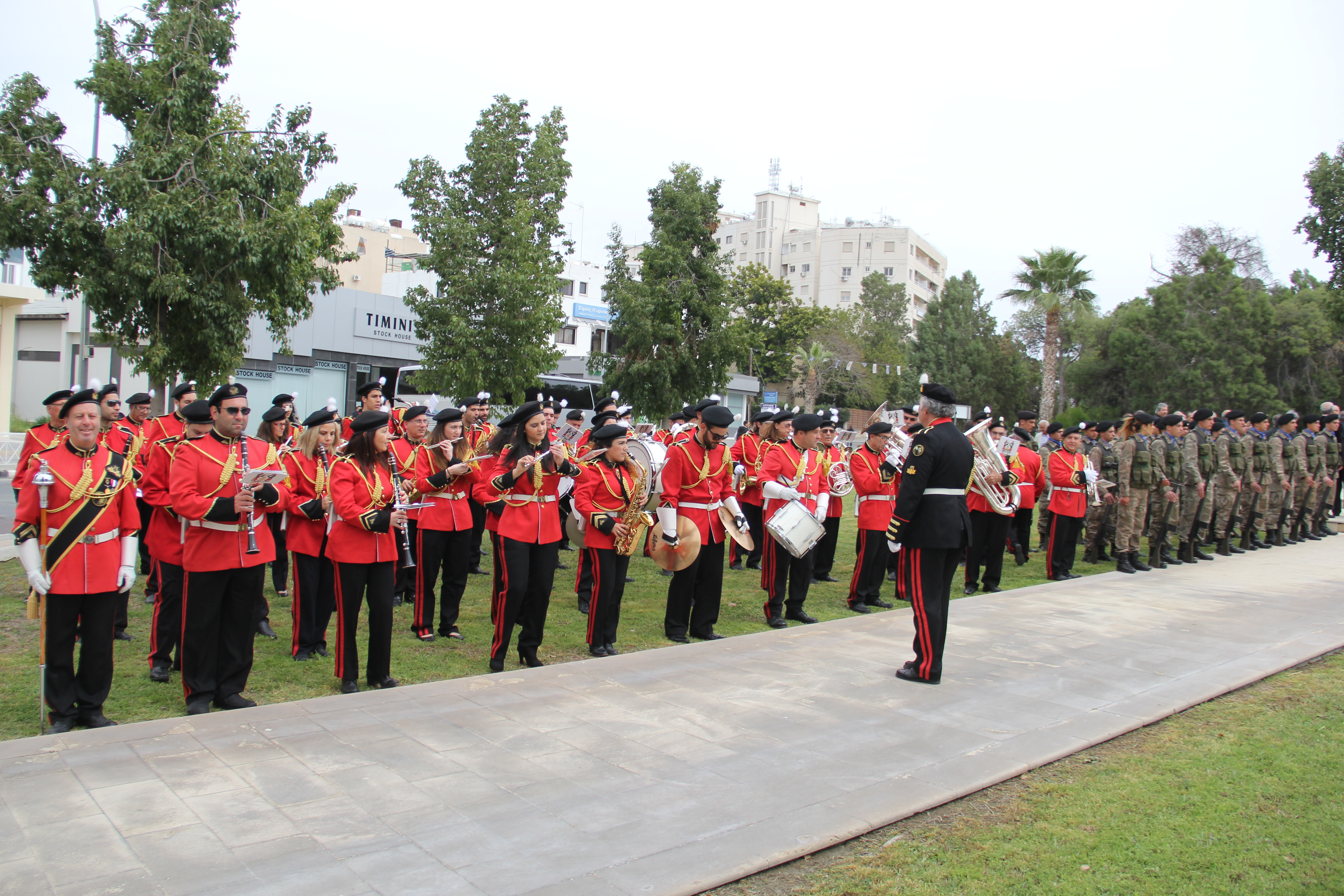
Larnaca Municipal Orchestra during the 25th of Match 2016 performance.

Larnaca Municipal Wind Orchestra is both a marching band and a wind band in Larnaca, Cyprus, that offers an extensive repertoire of music, ranging from marches to Latin, from jazz to rock 'n' roll, and from Greek favourites to movie soundtracks. Apart from playing for parades on national holidays, the band also makes regular appearances in various concerts and music festivals throughout Cyprus and abroad, representing both Larnaca and Cyprus internationally.

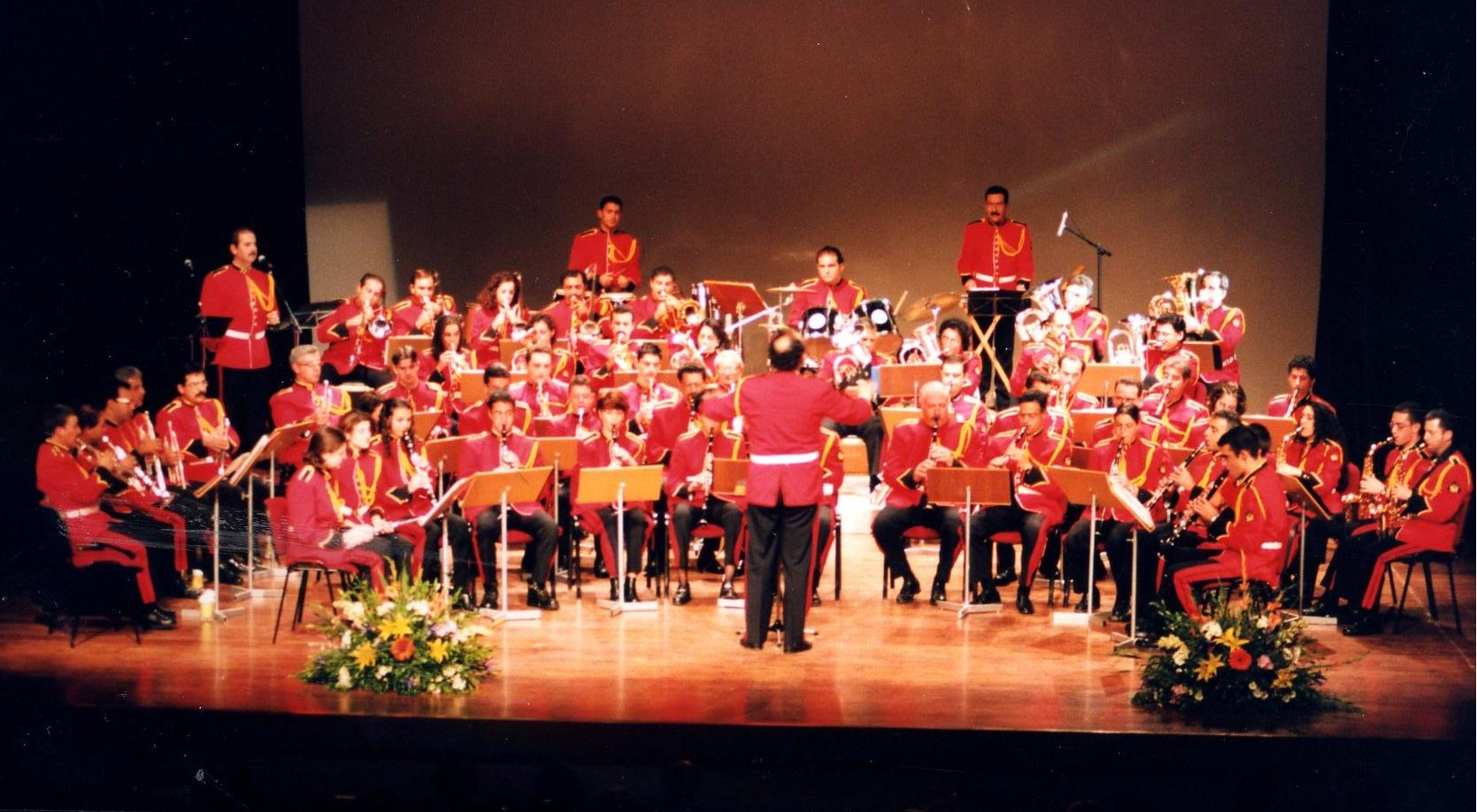
Larnaca Municipal Wind Orchestra at Larnaca Municipal Theatre, Larnaca, Cyprus.

== History ==
The first efforts to establish a Wind Orchestra in the Municipality of Larnaca date back to the beginning of the previous century. The first maestro was renowned Leopold Glazner, who was followed by Isaias Kalmanovitz.

The current Municipal Wind Orchestra was founded in 1987, and has been since then under the direction of the present maestro, Mr. Andreas Andreou. In 1988 the new Municipal Band made its first appearance in Larnaca at the parade of 28 October, a national holiday in Greece and Cyprus.

Since, its agenda has been full of important appearances and achievements in Cyprus as well as in Greece, in various occasions to Bulgaria, in Thessaloniki, in Rhodes, Corinth, Athens, Ilioupoli City, Czech Republic, Saint Petersburg, Romania, Hungary. In 1991 Larnaca Municipal Wind Orchestra made its appearance in Bulgaria, in 1993 in Greece, in 1994 in Rhodes and also in 1994 in Cyprus at a Band Festival of numerous bands from abroad which was organised by the Municipality of Larnaca.

The climax of the Wind Orchestra's accomplishments was its grand appearance at Saint Petersburg, Russia, in 2000. Other highlights include performances at the 2001 European Festival that took place in Thessaloniki, Greece, at the 2004 European Festival in Cheb, of the Czech Republic, and at the 2007 Celebrations of Europe Day in Bucharest, Romania, where the Band represented Cyprus alongside the other 24 member-states of the European Union.

Today, Larnaca Municipal Wind Orchestra is composed of people of all ages and professions, with a common interest in music. With the help of the Larnaka Municipality, which can always be relied on to support in every way, the Wind Orchestra runs smoothly, and, staffed by old and new performers and is also actively involved in Cyprus's cultural development.
