= Efstathios =

Efstathios (Greek: Ευστάθιος) is a Greek given name. Notable people with the name include:

- Efstathios Alexandris (1921–2013), Greek lawyer and politician
- Efstathios Alexopoulos (born 1946), Greek boxer
- Efstathios Aloneftis (born 1983), Greek footballer
- Efstathios Barootes (1918–2000), Canadian physician and politician
- Efstathios Chorafas (born 1871), Greek swimmer
- Efstathios Karousos (1730s–1818), Greek painter and writer
- Efstathios Katsikogiannis (born c. 1869), Greek military officer
- Efstathios E. Michaelides, Greek mechanical engineer
- Efstathios Papadionysiou (born 1992), Greek basketball player
- Efstathios Papadopoulos (born 1989), Greek sailor
- Efstathios Rokas (born 1984), Greek footballer
- Efstathios Sarantos (born 1952), Greek water polo player
- Efstathios Tavlaridis (born 1980), Greek footballer
- Efstathios Topalidis (born 1978), Greek wrestler
- Efstathios Vasileiou (born 1948), Greek hurdler
- Efstathios Vogdanos (born 1948), Greek cross-country skier
- Efstathios Zachos (born 1947), Greek mathematician, logician and computer scientist
