= Veli Këlcyra =

Albanian politician

Veli bey Këlcyra
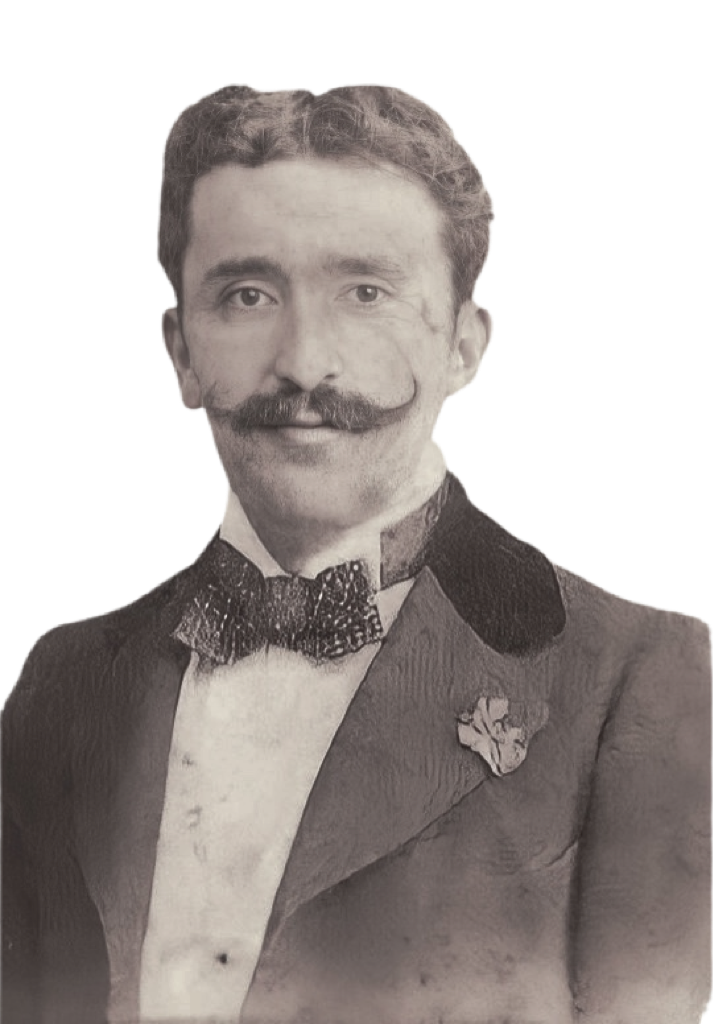
- Veli Këlcyra
- Born: 1862; Këlcyrë, Vilayet of Yannina, Ottoman Empire
- Died: 1924 (aged 61–62); Lausanne, Switzerland
- Known for: Albanian Declaration of Independence

Veli Këlcyra (1862–1924), usually referred as Veli Bey Këlcyra, was an Albanian influential bey and one of the delegates during the Albanian Declaration of Independence.

Veli Këlcyra came from the well known bey family of Këlcyrë, the same family of Ali Këlcyra, future leader of Balli Kombëtar. Këlcyra family was deported and interned near Arta during the reign of Ali Pashe Tepelena, and returned only after his death. They were known as local bey and a powerful family of the area after that.

His name appears within the Albanian Colony of Bucharest, as one of the founders of the "Committee of Albanians for the Freedom of Albania" (Albanian: Komitet i shqipëtarëve për lirin e Shqipërisë) on 5 May 1907 together with Kristo Meksi, Pandeli Evangjeli, Bajo Topulli, and Vasil Zografi as a branch of the Secret Committee for the Liberation of Albania of Bajo Topulli (1905) which headquarters were in Monastir.

Veli Këlcyra was a delegate of the Përmet region at the Declaration of Independence in Vlora, 28 November 1912. After the Independence he was not very active in the Albanian politics. The residence of the family located up in the hills near the Këlcyrë Gorge was bombarded by the Greek armies led by Zografos in 1914, because of the strong opposition to the annexation of south Albania by Greece, and later the Autonomous Republic of Northern Epirus.

His family left for Switzerland in 1914, and after that returned to the home town in 1918, including a short stay in Italy. Meanwhile, Veli Këlcyra remained in Switzerland because of serious health issues. He died from an incurable disease in 1924, and was buried in Lausanne.

His name and figure remains mostly unknown among Albanians, even due to the persecution the family during the Communist regime in Albania after World War II. In 2012, the municipality sent an official request to the Albanian Presidency to decorate Veli Këlcyra for his contribute to the national cause.

== See also ==
- Ali Këlcyra
