= 8th Motorized Infantry Brigade (Greece) =

- 8η Μηχανοποιημένη Ταξιαρχία Πεζικού (8η Μ/Π ΤΑΞ ΠΖ)
- Active: 2013–present
- Country: Greece
- Branch: Hellenic Army
- Type: Motorized infantry
- Size: 5 Battalions
- Part of: III Army Corps
- Garrison/HQ: Ioannina, Epirus
- Mottos: ΟΧΙ "NO"
- Anniversaries: 28 October 1940
- Engagements: Battle of Elaia–Kalamas Greco-Italian War

The 8th Motorized Infantry Brigade (Greek: 8η Μηχανοποιημένη Ταξιαρχία Πεζικού, 8η Μ/Π ΤΑΞ ΠΖ) is a motorized infantry brigade of the Hellenic Army. Based in Ioannina, it is one of the most historic units of the Hellenic Army, tracing its ancestry to the 8th Infantry Division (Greek: VIII Μεραρχία Πεζικού).

In a wide-ranging army reorganization in 2013, the division was reduced in size and converted into a motorized infantry brigade.

== Organization ==
=== Divisional HQ and support units ===
- HQ Company (ΛΣ VIII Μ/Π ΤΑΞ ΠΖ) based at Ioannina.
- 708th Engineer Battalion (708ο ΤΜΧ)
- 708th Logistic Battalion (708ο ΤΥΠ)

=== Combat elements ===
- 8th Reconnaissance Squadron (8η ΕΑΝ), located in Kalpaki.
- 628th Mechanized Infantry Battalion (628 M/Κ ΤΠ) based at Filiates.
- 583rd Mechanized Infantry Battalion (583 M/Κ ΤΠ) based at Konitsa.
- 625th Mechanized Infantry Battalion Recruit Training Center-Special Training Center (625 Μ/Π ΤΠ KEN-ΕΚΕ) located at Ioannina.
