= 8th Motor Brigade =

8th Motor Brigade or similar may refer to:

- 8th Motorized Infantry Brigade (Greece)
- 8th Motorized Brigade (Army of Republika Srpska)
- 8th Guards Mountain Motor Rifle Brigade

== See also ==
- 8th Brigade (disambiguation)
