= 5th Airmobile Brigade =

Military unit of the Hellenic Army

5th Airmobile Brigade "5th Cretan Division"
- 5η Αερομεταφερόμενη Ταξιαρχία Πεζικού "V Μεραρχία Κρητών"
- Camp flag of the 5th Airmobile Brigade
- Active: 1912–1941; 1951–present
- Country: Greece
- Allegiance: (Greece) Provisional Government of National Defence (1916–17)
- Branch: Hellenic Army
- Type: Air Assault
- Role: Rapid reaction
- Size: 2 Battalions
- Part of: ASDEN
- Garrison/HQ: Chania, Crete
- Mottos: Επικρατέειν ή Απόλλυσθαι “Prevail or be Destroyed” (Herodotus, Histories, VII 104.5)
- Engagements: Balkan Wars: First Balkan War; Second Balkan War; World War I: Macedonian front; Internment at Görlitz; Greco-Turkish War (1919–1922): Battle of the Sakarya; World War II: Greco-Italian War; Capture of Kleisoura Pass; Battle of Trebeshina; Battle of Greece; Battle of Crete

Commanders
- Notable commanders: Dimitrios Matthaiopoulos

The 5th Airmobile Brigade "5th Cretan Division" (Greek: 5η Αερομεταφερόμενη Ταξιαρχία Πεζικού «V Μεραρχία Κρητών»), formerly the 5th Infantry Division (V Μεραρχία Πεζικού) and commonly referred to simply as the Cretan Division (Μεραρχία Κρητών), is an air assault brigade of the Hellenic Army responsible for the defense of the southern Aegean sea.

== History ==
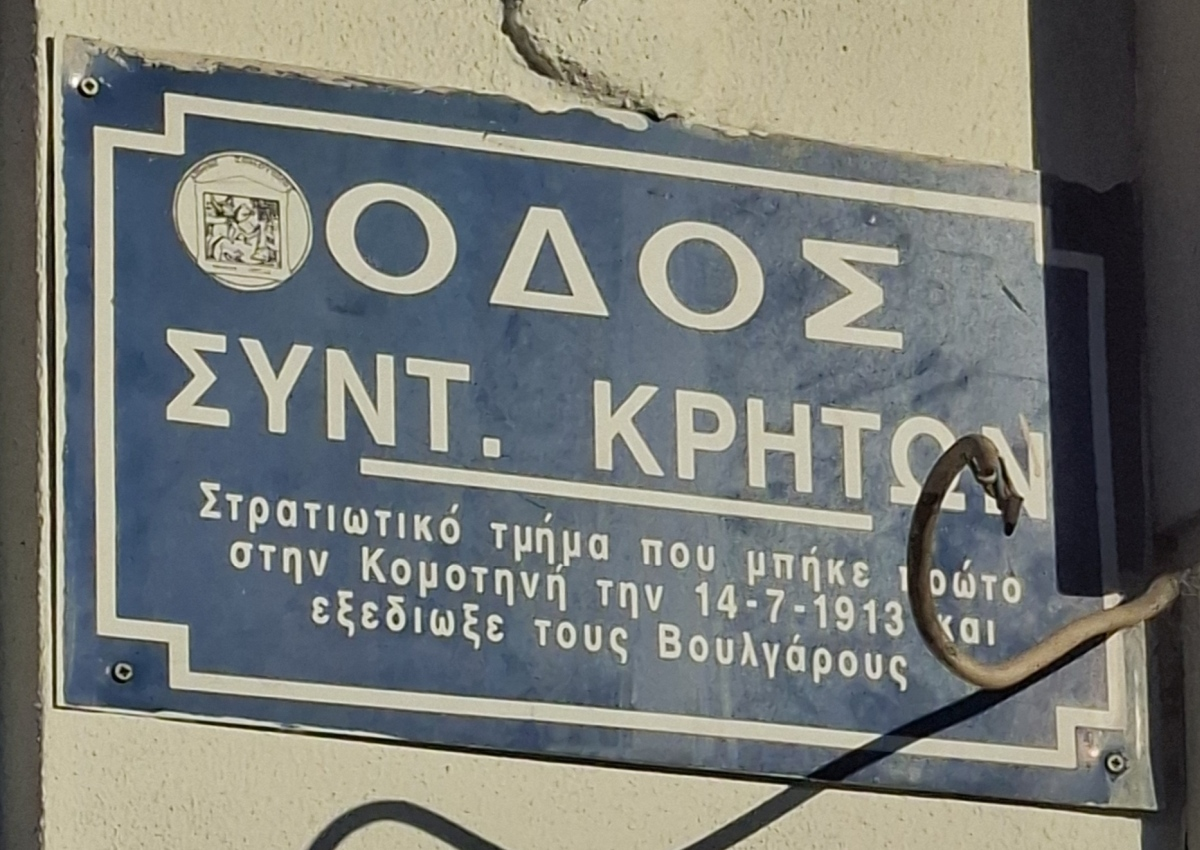
Street sign in Komotini, commemorating its capture by 5th Div forces during the Second Balkan War

The 5th Division was first formed in September 1912 at Farsala, on the eve of the First Balkan War, following the mobilization of Greece and the other Balkan League states. Its first commander was Colonel Dimitrios Matthaiopoulos, and it comprised the 16th, 22nd and 23rd Infantry Regiments, the 3rd Squadron of the 1st Field Artillery Regiment and the 2nd Mountain Artillery Squadron.

The division fought in the First and Second Balkan War, and was retained on the Army's order of battle afterwards. It was relocated to Kilkis in August 1913 and from December 1913 in Drama in Macedonia, and subordinated to the newly formed IV Army Corps. It comprised the 22nd and 23rd Infantry Regiments and the 3/37 Cretan Regiment. As Greece remained neutral initially during World War I, the division remained at Drama. On 12 September 1916, along with the rest of IV Corps – at the time demobilized to a skeleton force of ca. 7,000 men – it surrendered to the Germans during the German-Bulgarian occupation of eastern Macedonia. For the remainder of the war, the 5th Division was interned at Görlitz in Germany, and was disbanded upon the war's end.

Soon after, the outbreak of a Venizelist revolt in Thessaloniki resulted in the formation of a "Provisional Government of National Defence", which entered World War I on the side of the Allies. The new government quickly extended its authority across northern Greece and the Aegean Islands, including Crete. There, from October 1916 until April 1917 a new Cretan Division, based at Chania, was formed. The division participated in the Macedonian Front operations in 1917–1918, and subsequently in the Asia Minor Campaign, during which it was distinguished in the Battle of Sakarya. In early 1921, following the anti-Venizelist victory in the November 1920 elections, the division was renamed to 5th Infantry Division in order to purge the Venizelist-associated name.

Following the Greek defeat in Asia Minor in August 1922, the division retreated along with the rest of the Greek army, to Chios. It was reformed at Serres in early 1923, again as the Cretan Division, by merging the remnants of the 5th and 9th divisions. On 30 June 1923 it was re-renamed to 5th Infantry Division. From 1924, the division was based again in Chania in Crete, comprising the 14th (Chania), 43rd (Heraklion) and 44th (Rethymno) Infantry Regiments.

With the arrival of British troops that took over the defense of the island in late 1940, the division was transferred to the Albanian front where it participated in the January–February offensives against the Italians, distinguishing itself in the Capture of Kleisoura Pass and in the Battle of Trebeshina. On January 29, 1941, the 14th Infantry Regiment under Colonel Nikolaos Spendos advanced through heavy blizzards to take the 1,923 meter Mount Trebeshinë, which had been abandoned by the Italians. After reinforcing defensive positions, they met consecutive Italian counter-attacks throughout the night and suffered considerable casualties to hold the position. The 11th Rifle Company, which had been tasked with holding the peak, saw particularly heavy fighting. Its commander, Captain Artemios Kourtessis, lost both his legs in the battle, while 2nd Lieutenant Hesiod Tsingos was awarded the Medal of Valour in Gold for conspicuous gallantry.

The division remained in the front until the Greek withdrawal from Albania in the face of the German invasion of Greece in April. The division retreated to the Peloponnese, where it dissolved itself in May 1941, as there was no way for it to reach Crete. However, three battalions that had remained in Crete after the rest of the division was transferred to the mainland participated in the subsequent Battle of Crete.

Greece was liberated from German occupation in October 1944, although German garrisons remained on Crete until the German capitulation in May 1945. Soon after, the Independent Crete Military Command was established, comprising the 603rd, 606th and 607th National Guard Battalions. In April 1946, these troops were reformed as the 51st Independent Brigade (51η Ανεξάρτητη Ταξιαρχία). On 2 January 1951, it was reformed as the 5th Infantry Division, comprising three battalions and a Mountain Artillery Squadron. In 1954, with the reduction of the army's size, the 5th Division was converted into a training and reserve formation.

On 1 July 2004, as part of a general reorganization of the Greek Army's structure, the division was disbanded and reorganized as the 5th Infantry Brigade (5η Ταξιαρχία Πεζικού). On 20 October 2009 however, it was renamed as the 5th Cretan Division (V Μεραρχία Κρητών). In a wide-ranging defence review in 2013, the brigade was transformed into an air assault unit, earmarked for rapid reaction in the southern Aegean Sea. It retains its traditional name of "5th Cretan Division" as an honorary title, however.

== Structure ==
- 5th Airmobile Brigade, based at Chania
- HQ Company (Λ/Σ 5ης Α/Μ ΤΑΞ ΠΖ)
- 5th Signal Corps Company (5 ΛΔΒ)
- 547th Airmobile Infantry Battalion (547 A/M ΤΠ)
- 548th Airmobile Infantry Battalion (548 Α/Μ ΤΠ) at Rethimno
- 545th Airmobile Infantry Battalion (545 A/M ΤΠ)
- 546th Airmobile Infantry Battalion (546 Α/Μ ΤΠ) at Heraklion.
- 5th Support Battalion (5 ΤΥΠ)
- 699th Outpost Weaponry Vault (699 ΠΑΠ)
- Rethymnon Home Guard Battalion (ΤΕ Ρεθυμνου)
- Heracleion Home Guard Battalion (ΤΕ Ηρακλειου)
- Chania Home Guard Battalion (ΤΕ Χανιων)

== General and cited sources ==
- Ενημερωτικός οδηγός μετατιθέμενων στελεχών στην Ν. Κρήτη [Informational guide for personnel transferred to Crete] (PDF) (in Greek). 5th Cretan Division. April 2010.
- Η ιστορία της οργάνωσης του Ελληνικού Στρατού, 1821–1954 [The history of the organization of the Hellenic Army, 1821–1954] (in Greek). Hellenic Army Historical Directorate. 2005. ISBN 960-7897-45-5.
