= Sukë =

- Administrative unit
- Location within Albania
- Coordinates: 40°22′N 20°9′E
- Country: Albania
- County: Gjirokastër
- Municipality: Këlcyrë

Population (2011)
  - Administrative unit: 1,256
- Time zone: UTC+1 (CET)
  - Summer (DST): UTC+2 (CEST)

Sukë is a village and a former municipality in the Gjirokastër County, southern Albania. At the 2015 local government reform it became a subdivision of the municipality Këlcyrë. The population at the 2011 census was 1,256. The municipality consists of the villages Sukë, Goricë, Fshat i Ri, Rodenjë, Podgoran, Podgoran Fushë, Ujmirë, Zhepovë, Shelq, Topojan, Luar, Delilaj, Çorogunj and Taroninë.
