= XXV Army Corps (Italy) =

Royal Italian Army infantry corps

The XXV Army Corps (Italian: XXV Corpo d'Armata) was an infantry corps of the Royal Italian Army during World War I, the Italian invasion of Albania, and the Greco-Italian War and the subsequent Italian occupation of Greece during World War II.

== History ==
The XXV Corps was first established in Mortegliano on 10 April 1917, until its disbandment on 5 January 1919.

On 24 October 1940, in preparation for the Italian invasion of Greece on the 28th, the Army Corps of the Ciamuria, which operated in the Chameria region (Italian: Ciamuria), was activated in Italian-occupied Albania. The Army Corps consisted of the 23rd Infantry Division "Ferrara", 51st Infantry Division "Siena", 131st Armored Division "Centauro", and Regiment "Cavalleggeri Guide". It was assigned the western (right) half of the Italian front, and on the start of the war advanced into Greek territory until it was stopped in the Battle of Elaia–Kalamas. Following the start of the Greek counteroffensive on the Italian left, covered by XXVI Army Corps, it was forced to retreat. On 17 November 1940 it was redesignated as XXV Army Corps. On 7 December it abandoned Gjirokastër, on 18 December Porto Palermo, and on 20 Himarë. To shorten its front, the corps was assigned in mid-December to the sector around Tomorr and the That e Progonat lines, where the Greek offensive was stopped.

On 20 January 1941 it launched spoiling attacks in the Vjosa sector to relieve pressure on the Italian left, which was facing the final, unsuccessful Greek push towards Berat. In February, the corps was deployed from Shëndelli to Kurvelesh, and opposed the Greek attacks in the Mount Trebeshinë–Mount Shëndelli area. On 8 March the corps was placed in defence of Tepelenë, while on the next day it took part in the unsuccessful Italian Spring Offensive (9–18 March). Following the German invasion of Greece on 6 April, the Italian forces in the Albanian front began their own advance against the retreating Greeks; the corps occupied Trebeshinë on 14 April and the Klisura Pass the next day, arriving at Derviçan and Gjirokastër on 19 April. After the Greek capitulation and the Axis occupation of Greece, the corps was disbanded on 31 July and its units transferred to XXVI Corps.

XXV Corps was reconstituted in Albania on 16 December 1941 with its seat at Vlorë. It comprised the 33rd Infantry Division "Acqui" and 49th Infantry Division "Parma", in coastal defence and anti-partisan duties. The corps was disbanded on 12 September 1943 following the Italian armistice.

== Commanders ==
- Generale di corpo d'armata Carlo Rossi (1940.12.10 – 1941.07.31)
- Generale di divisione Alessandro Gloria (interim)
- Generale di corpo d'armata Giovanni Vecchi (1941.12.05 – 1943.02.12)
- Generale di corpo d'armata Umberto Mondino (1943.02.12 – 1943.09.08)
