= Këlcyrë Castle =

Castle in southern Albania

Këlcyrë Castle Kalaja e Këlcyrës
- Këlcyrë, in Southern Albania
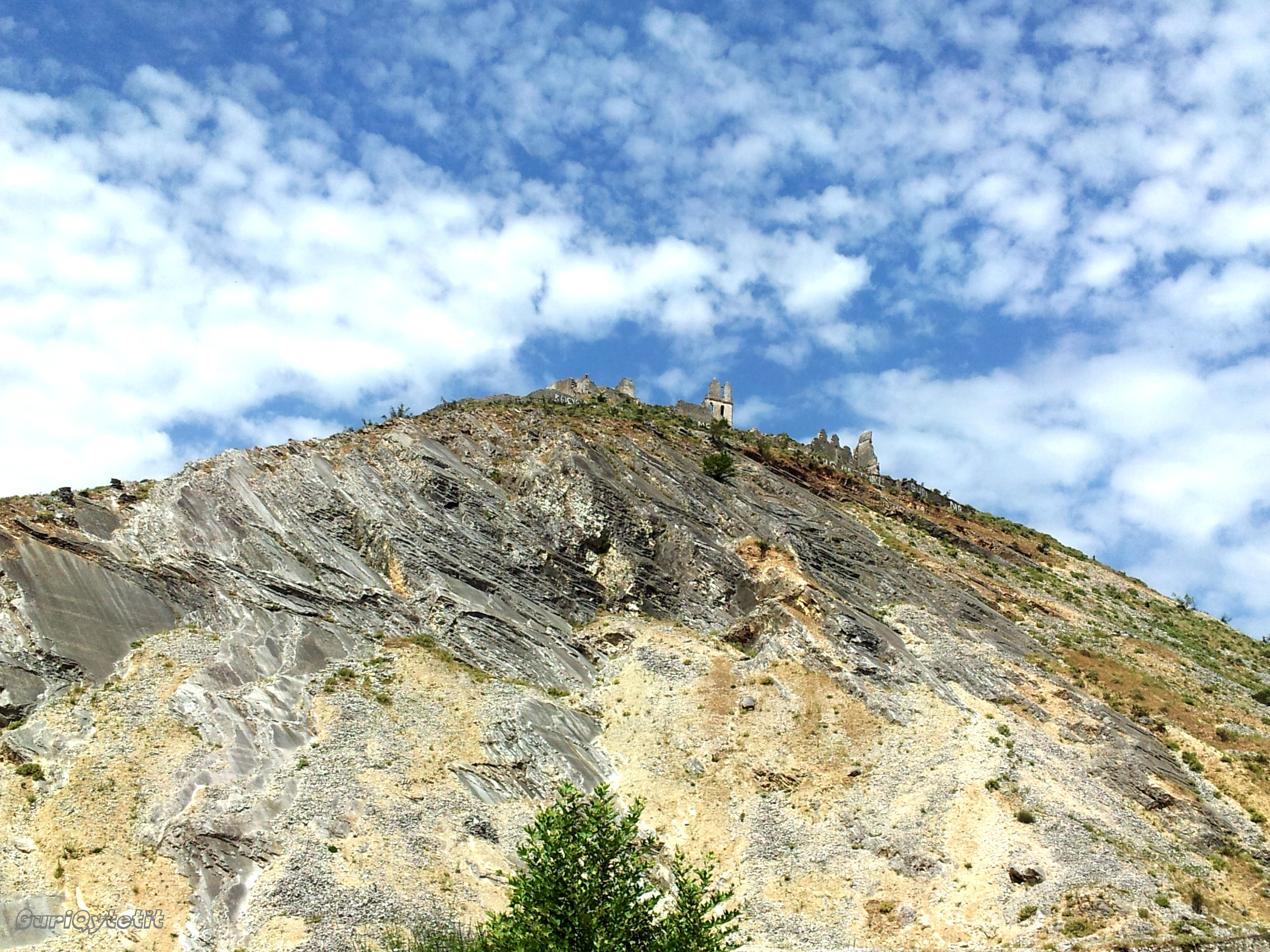
- Panorama of Këlcyrë Castle

Site information
- Owner: Albania
- Controlled by: Epirus; Upper Macedonia; Illyrian tribes Roman Empire; Kingdom of Albania; Muzaka family Byzantine Empire; Principality of Zenebishi; Ottoman Empire; Albania
- Open to the public: Yes

Location
- Coordinates: 40.308277°N 20.185367°E

Site history
- Built: 3rd-4th century BC
- Materials: Ancient blocks

Këlcyrë Castle (Albanian: Kalaja e Këlcyrës) is a castle near the city of Këlcyrë. The castle was first built in the 3rd-4th century BC by Illyrian tribes in the region.

== See also ==
- Këlcyrë
- Gorge of Këlcyrë
- Illyrians
- List of castles in Albania
- Tourism in Albania
- History of Albania
- Architecture of Albania
