= Carlo Rossi (general) =

Italian general (1880–1967)

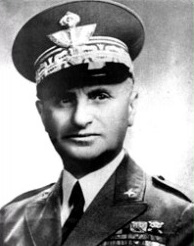
- Born: 29 December 1880; Celenza Valfortore, Kingdom of Italy
- Died: 21 April 1967 (aged 86); Turin, Italy
- Military career
- Allegiance: Kingdom of Italy
- Branch: Royal Italian Army
- Service years: 1905–1945
- Rank: Lieutenant General
- Commands: 52nd Alpine Assault Battalion; 57th Infantry Regiment; 4th Alpini Regiment; 58th Infantry Division Legnano; 3rd Alpine Division Julia; 37th Infantry Division Modena; XVI Army Corps; Alpine Army Corps; II Army Corps; XXV Army Corps
- Conflicts: Italo-Turkish War; First Italo-Senussi War; World War I; White War; First Battle of Monte Grappa; Second Battle of the Piave River; Battle of Vittorio Veneto; World War II; Battle of the Western Alps; Greco-Italian War; Battle of Elaia–Kalamas; Battle of Trebeshina; Italian Spring Offensive; Allied invasion of Sicily; Operation Achse
- Awards: Silver Medal of Military Valor (three times); Bronze Medal of Military Valor (twice); Military Order of Savoy; Maurician Medal

Carlo Rossi (Celenza Valfortore, 29 December 1880 – Turin, 21 April 1967) was an Italian general during World War II.

== Biography ==
=== Early years ===
Born in Celenza Valfortore in 1880, the son of Michelangelo Rossi and Agnese Maria Luigia Fantetti, he attended the Military Academy of Modena and was commissioned in Parma on 22 October 1905. From December 1909 he was a lieutenant in the 8th Alpini Regiment.

On 29 September 1912, he sailed from Naples for Libya, where the Italo-Turkish War was coming to an end, but a fierce guerrilla war was being waged by the local population. He was aide to the commander of the 1st Company of the 8th Alpini Regiment, under the command of Colonel Antonio Cantore; he distinguished himself in the fighting in Libya, for which he received a Silver Medal of Military Valor. He was wounded in the left arm in a skirmish that took place on the night between 20 and 21 March 1913, and on 18 June of the same year he earned a second silver medal for his behaviour in a clash near Wādī et-Tangī; in September he was awarded a Bronze Medal of Military Valor for his role in the capture of a Senussi camp in Tecniz in Cyrenaica. He then returned to Italy, landing in Genoa on November 30, 1913. He was appointed Knight of the Order of the Crown of Italy for his performance during the Libyan campaign.

=== World War I ===
He was promoted to captain in January 1915 and assigned to the 7th Alpini Regiment, 96th Company, and was mobilised in May when Italy entered the First World War. His unit was deployed on Monte Piana, in the Sexten Dolomites. On 20 July, while leading the assault on the Austro-Hungarian entrenchments on Monte Piana, Rossi was shot in the right shoulder with an explosive bullet. For the bravery shown in this action, he was awarded his third silver medal of military valour.

On 29 July 1916, following the conquest of the Castelletto in the Tofane massif, he was decorated with the Cross of the Military Order of Savoy. In September, he was seriously wounded for the fourth time and was in danger of his life until early 1917. In the spring of 1918, he organized the 52nd Alpine Assault Battalion, helping to stop the Austro-Hungarian advance on Cima Ekar and Costalunga on the Asiago plateau; the latter was seized by the Austro-Hungarians, and Rossi directed its reconquest by launching a joint counterattack by the 52nd Battalion and other Italian and French units. This feat earned him another bronze medal.

In October 1918, Rossi, by then a Major, broke through the enemy lines with the assault group of the 6th Army and took the Austro-Hungarians in the rear at Monte Interrotto (Asiago), thus favoring the advance of British troops in the battle of Vittorio Veneto.

=== Interwar years ===
After promotion to Colonel in 1927, Rossi, who had already commanded the 57th Infantry Regiment, was appointed commander of the 4th Alpini Regiment from 1927 to 1934. In 1935, he briefly commanded the 58th Infantry Division Legnano, and on 10 September 1935, shortly after promotion to Brigadier General, he became the first commander of the newly established 3rd Alpine Division Julia, until 1938. In 1937, he was promoted to Major General; from September 1938 to February 1939, he was attached to the Army Corps of Udine, and from February to March 1939 to that of Alessandria. In March 1939, he assumed command of the 37th Infantry Division Modena, which he held until June 1940.

=== World War II and later years ===
In June 1940, Rossi was given command of the XVI Army Corps and then sent to the Aosta Valley, where he assumed command of the Alpine Army Corps, which, advancing from Mont Blanc, penetrated French territory for thirty kilometres, conquering the first fortified system of the Isère valley. From July to October 1940, he commanded the II Army Corps.

On 25 October 1940, he was sent to Albania to take command of the Army Corps of Chameria, soon renamed XXV Army Corps. The advance into Greece progressed slowly, hampered by bad weather and the stubborn Greek resistance; following the start of the Greek counteroffensive on the Italian left, covered by XXVI Army Corps, the XXV Corps was also forced to retreat beyond the prewar border, abandoning Gjirokastër on 7 December, Porto Palermo on 18 December and Himara on 20 December. To shorten its front, in mid-December the corps was assigned to the sector around Mount Tomorr and the That e Progonat lines, where the Greek offensive was stopped. The front then became stationary until the German intervention in April 1941 and the subsequent fall of Greece, after which Rossi was promoted to Lieutenant General.

At the end of July 1941, he returned to Milan to reform the XVI Army Corps, which at the end of October was transferred first to Naples and then to Sicily, where he established his headquarters in Piazza Armerina. On 10 July 1943, when the Allies landed in Sicily, the XVI Corps under General Rossi was composed of two infantry divisions (4th Livorno and 54th Napoli), two coastal divisions (206th and 213th) and two coastal brigades (XVIII and XIX). Rossi's troops, stationed in eastern Sicily, were immediately affected by the landings in Gela, Noto, Avola and Cassibile, suffering heavy losses and being forced to retreat to Catania, then to the Simeto-Etna line, then to the Randazzo-Fiumefreddo line and finally to the Francavilla-Taormina line. By mid-August, all units under Rossi's command had been destroyed, with the exception of the severely weakened Livorno Division, and he was evacuated to the mainland along with his command. He was then tasked with organizing the defense of the Calabrian coasts, but was then transferred to La Spezia where the XVI Corps was reformed with the 105th Infantry Division Rovigo and 6th Alpine Division Alpi Graie, tasked with defending the naval base and its hinterland.

After the proclamation of the Armistice of Cassibile on 8 September 1943, Rossi's troops halted the German advance towards La Spezia long enough for the fleet to escape, after which they were overwhelmed, and Rossi was captured on the morning of 9 September. He was then imprisoned in Oflag 64/Z in Schokken, Poland, refusing any offer to join the Italian Social Republic. In late January 1945, he was freed by the advancing Red Army, then held as a "guest" in the Soviet Union until the end of the hostilities, when he was finally allowed to return to Italy on 6 October 1945.

In 1952, he was awarded the Solemn Commendation by the Ministry of Defence, as although captured and interned in Schokken, he had chosen to "remain faithful to the laws of military honour and refused to join the Social Republic, preferring to endure the harsh sacrifice of captivity, particularly painful for his impaired physical condition".

In 1955, he was awarded the Maurician Medal of Military Merit for fifty years of service.

He died in Turin in 1967.
