= Lorentzos Mavilis =

Greek sonneteer, war poet, and chess problems composer

- Λορέντζος Μαβίλης; Lorenzo Mabili
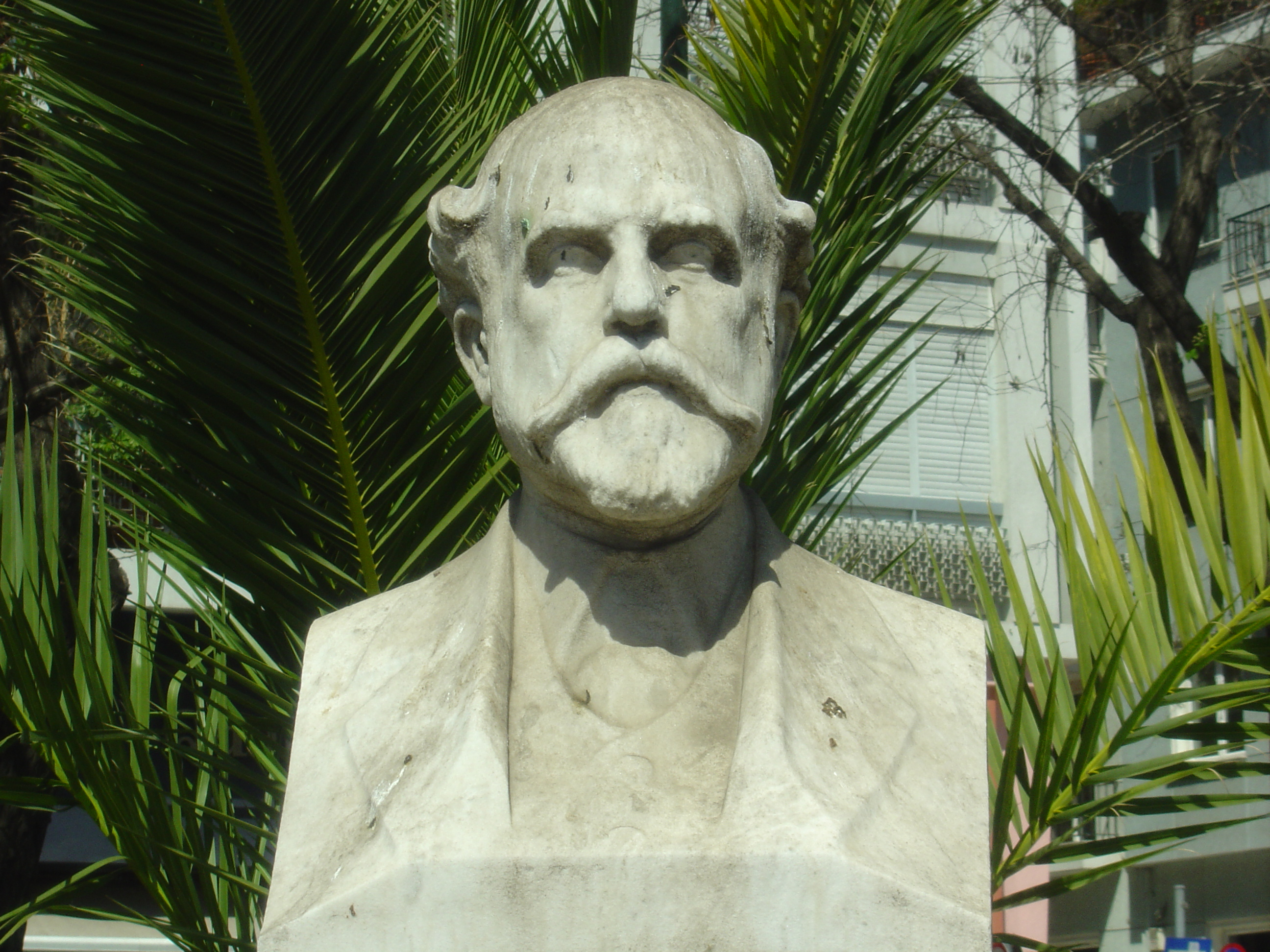
- A bust of Mavilis in Athens
- Born: 6 September 1860; Ithaca, United States of the Ionian Islands (now Greece)
- Died: 28 November 1912 (aged 52); Driskos, Janina Vilayet, Ottoman Empire (now Greece)
- Spouse: Theoni Drakopoulou
- Military career
- Allegiance: Kingdom of Greece
- Branch: Hellenic Army
- Unit: Redshirts
- Conflicts: Greco-Turkish War (1897); Cretan Revolt; Balkan Wars; First Balkan War; Battle of Driskos †

Lorentzos Mavilis (Greek: Λορέντζος Μαβίλης; Spanish: Lorenzo Mabili; 6 September 1860 – 28 November 1912) was a Greek sonneteer, war poet, and chess problems composer. He is best known for his sonnets.

== Biography ==
He was born in Ithaca and was of half-Spanish origin from his father who was a judge in the Ionian islands, and half-Greek from his local mother. His Spanish paternal grandfather, Don Lorenzo Mabili y Boulligny, was consul of Spain in Corfu and upon arriving in Greece, Hellenized his surname from Mabili to Mavilis. He studied philology and philosophy in Germany and started to compose poems and chess problems (chess was his other passion).

He was a great supporter of the Megali Idea. In 1896, he joined the Cretan revolt against the Ottoman rule and in 1897, during the Greco-Turkish War, he participated in the fighting with a group of Corfiot volunteers.

In 1909, he supported the Goudi coup and in 1910 was elected as a member of the Greek Parliament with the Liberal Party, representing Corfu. As an MP, he took an active part in the dispute on the Greek language question, defending the use of the Demotic Greek against the Katharevousa literary language.

With the outbreak of the First Balkan War in 1912, despite his advanced age (he was 52), he decided to join the army. He served in a mixed group of Greek soldiers Garibaldini volunteers from Italy, holding the rank of captain. He was killed in action on 28 November 1912, during the Battle of Driskos, in the vicinity of which he is buried. According to fellow poet Nikolaos Karvounis his last words were:

I was expecting honours from this war, but not the honour to sacrifice myself for Greece!

== Sources ==
- Kargakos, Sarandos (2012). Η Ελλάς κατά τους Βαλκανικούς Πολέμους (1912-1913) [Greece in the Balkan Wars (1912-1913)] (in Greek). Athens: Peritechnon. ISBN 978-960-8411-26-5.
- Hibon, Roland, "Ἀνέκδοτα ἔργα τοῦ Μαβίλη ", Ἠπειρωτικὴ Ἑστία, 17, 200 (1968), σσ. 537–546
- "Νεοελληνική Ποιητική Ανθολογία", ΒΙΠΕΡ No. 100, εκδόσεις "Πάπυρος ΠΡΕΣΣ", Αθήναι, 1971
- "Ελληνική Ανθολογημένη Ποίηση", Γαβριήλ Πεντζίκης, εκδόσεις "Ινστιτούτο Διαδόσεως Ελληνικού Βιβλίου", Αθήνα, 1980
- Νούτσος Παναγιώτης, "O Λ. Mαβίλης ως συνοδοιπόρος των 'Kοινωνιολόγων' ", O Πολίτης, αρ. 44 (5 December 1997), 37–41
- Savinio, Alberto, Narrate, uomini, la vostra storia, εκδόσεις Adelphi, Milano, 1984, 133-147
