= Dimitrios Matthaiopoulos =

Greek army officer (1861–1923)

- Δημήτριος Ματθαιόπουλος
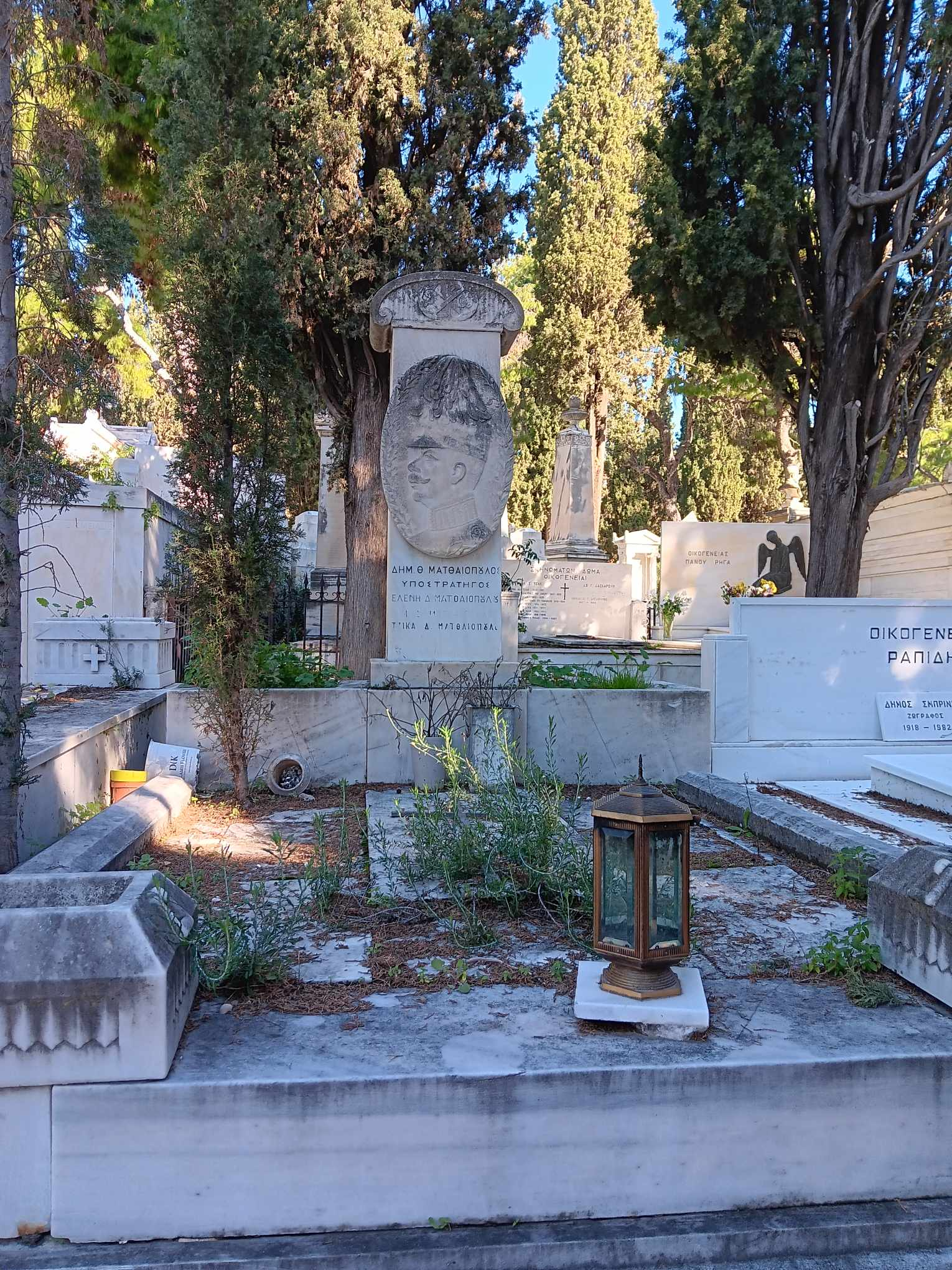
- Tombstone of Dimitrios Matthaiopoulos
- Born: 1861; Piraeus, Kingdom of Greece
- Died: December 1923
- Military career
- Allegiance: Kingdom of Greece
- Branch: Hellenic Army
- Service years: 1881–1922
- Rank: Lieutenant General
- Commands: 5th Infantry Division; 8th Infantry Division
- Conflicts: Greco-Turkish War of 1897; Balkan Wars: Battle of Sorovich; Battle of Driskos; Battle of Bizani (WIA)

Dimitrios Matthaiopoulos (Greek: Δημήτριος Ματθαιόπουλος; 1861–1923) was a senior Hellenic Army officer who participated in the Balkan Wars of 1912–1913.

== Biography ==
He was born in Piraeus in 1861, entered the Hellenic Military Academy and was commissioned as an Engineer officer on 24 March 1881. He participated in the Greco-Turkish War of 1897.

Between 1900 and 1910 Matthaiopoulos taught military engineering and fortification works at the Hellenic Military Academy. Between 1910 and 1912, as colonel, he supervised the construction of fortifications around on the Greco-Ottoman border in Thessaly.

During the mobilization before the outbreak of the First Balkan War, Matthaiopoulos was placed as CO of the 5th Infantry Division, newly formed from reservists. During the war, he was tasked with covering the left flank of the Army of Thessaly through his division's advance into Western Macedonia. His division, however, was attacked by superior Ottoman troops and driven back at the Battle of Sorovich, on 22–24 October 1912.

Dismissed from his command, he was placed in charge of the 8th Infantry Division in the Army of Epirus, with which he participated in the Battle of Bizani where he was wounded. During the Second Balkan War, the 8th Infantry Division under Matthaiopoulos conducted an amphibious operation which resulted in the Greek annexation of Eastern Macedonia. He retired in November 1922, with the rank of lieutenant general.

He died in December 1923.

== Sources ==
- Kargakos, Sarandos (2012). Η Ελλάς κατά τους Βαλκανικούς Πολέμους (1912-1913) [Greece in the Balkan Wars (1912-1913)] (in Greek). Peritechnon. ISBN 978-960-8411-26-5.
