= Battle of Driskos =

Ottoman victory in Greece, 1912

Coordinates: 39°39′24.9″N 20°57′38.0″E

- Part of the First Balkan War
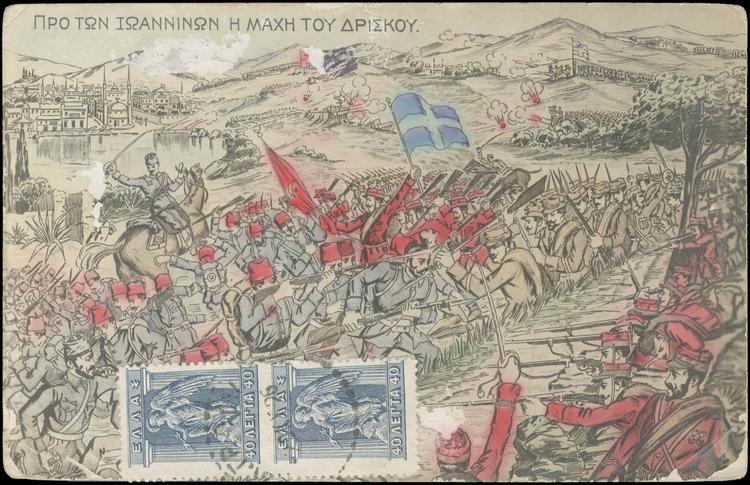
- Postcard depicting the battle
| Date | 26–28 November 1912 (Note: All dates used in this article are Old Style which is 13 days before New Style.) |
| Location | Driskos, Janina Vilayet, Ottoman Empire (present-day Greece) |
| Result | Ottoman victory |

Belligerents
| Greece | Ottoman Empire |

Commanders and leaders
| Dimitrios Matthaiopoulos; Alexandros Romas (WIA); Peppino Garibaldi | Esad Pasha |

Units involved
| Metsovo Detachment: Italian Redshirts; Corps of Greek Red Shirts; Cretan volunteers | Yanya Corps: 19th Division; Albanian irregulars |

Strength
| 3,800 | 7,000–10,000 |

Casualties and losses
| 200–400 killed 400 wounded | 1,000–2,000 killed and wounded |
- Location of the battle in present day Greece

The Battle of Driskos (Greek: Μάχη του Δρίσκου, Turkish: Driskos Muharebesi), took place on 26–28 November (O.S.), 1912. It was fought between Greek forces under General Dimitrios Matthaiopoulos and Ottoman forces under General Esad Pasha during the First Balkan War. The battle began when a unit of Greek Redshirt volunteers attacked the Ottoman defensive line at Mount Driskos, Epirus.

The Greeks seized the Ottoman camp and cleared its surroundings. On 27 November, the Ottomans regrouped after receiving considerable reinforcements in both manpower and artillery, launching an assault on Greek positions. The Greeks began withdrawing at noon the following day, after realizing that they were at risk of being overwhelmed. The Battle of Driskos marked the last intervention of the Redshirts into Greek expansionist conflicts.

== Background ==
During 1912, Greece, Serbia, Bulgaria, and Montenegro joined in a Balkan League against the Ottoman Empire. Fearing a new war in the Balkans, the Ottomans mobilized their armed forces on 14 September and began transferring units to Thrace; the Balkan League responded in kind. On 30 September, the League presented the Ottomans with a list of demands regarding the rights of its Christian population. The Ottoman Empire rebuffed the demands, recalled its ambassadors in Sofia, Belgrade and Athens and expelled the League's negotiators on 4 October. The League declared war against the Ottomans, while Montenegro had already begun military operations on 25 September.

Greece dispatched the Army of Epirus and the Army of Thessaly to its frontiers in Epirus and Thessaly respectively. The Army of Epirus numbered 20,000 men and 30 artillery pieces and was commanded by Lieutenant General Konstantinos Sapountzakis. Facing the Greeks in Epirus was the Yanya Corps under General Esad Pasha, which numbered 35,000 men and 102 artillery pieces; most of which were concentrated at the Yanya Fortified Area protecting the regional capital of Yanya (Ioannina). The Army of Epirus was ordered to only conduct a limited number of offensive operations, mainly focusing on protecting the Army of Thessaly's western flank, because it was too small to breach the Ottoman defenses around Yanya.

The Yanya Fortified Area included two major fortresses, those of Bizani and Kastritsa, guarding the main southern approaches, along with five smaller forts in a ring around the city, covering the western and northwestern approaches. The terrain south of Yanya provided excellent defensive ground, as all the roads leading to the city could be observed from Bizani. The Army of Epirus crossed the Bridge of Arta into Ottoman territory at midday 6 October, capturing the Gribovo heights by the end of the day. On 19 October, the Army of Epirus launched an attack on Preveza in conjunction with the Ionian squadron of the Greek Navy, taking the city on 21 October. On 27 October, the Hellenic Army captured Metsovo.

== Prelude ==
Motivated by militant Philhellenism and Liberationist ideology, the leader of the Italian Redshirts, Ricciotti Garibaldi, called upon his followers to support the Greek war effort. Garibaldi only managed to recruit 140–200 Italian volunteers due to administrative barriers placed by the country's government and internal opposition within Italy's leftist circles. Nevertheless, many Greek citizens and members of the Greek diaspora, as well as smaller numbers of Bulgarians, Britons and Frenchmen answered the call, bringing the unit to 2,224 men. The unit was split into four battalions, two of which were dubbed Corps of Greek Red Shirts and were commanded by former Speaker of the Hellenic Parliament and veteran Redshirt, Count Alexandros Romas. The Garibaldini were equipped by the Greek government, which provided them with obsolete Gras rifles and old surplus swords, but failed to issue them with winter greatcoats. The Garibaldini and a regular army rear area protection battalion arrived at Metsovo between 17 and 20 November, forming the 3,800-man strong Metsovo Detachment.

On 23 November, the newly appointed commander of the Metsovo Detachment General Dimitrios Matthaiopoulos arrived in Metsovo. A day prior Ricciotti Garibaldi ordered his son Peppino Garibaldi to advance in the direction of Mount Driskos at the head of a unit of 500 Redshirts. This was done on Garibaldi's own initiative and was not communicated to the Greek General Staff. On 24 November, Sapountzakis ordered Romas to capture Mount Driskos and the north-eastern shore of Lake Pamvotida. The Garibaldini were then to unite with the rest of the Army of Epirus and launch a coordinated attack on Bizani. The same day, the rest of the Redshirts set off from Metsovo in the same direction. The Redshirts under Peppino reached the caravanserai of Kamber Agha north east of the village of Kryovrysi on 25 November, having encountered no resistance. Matthaiopoulos then commanded units of Greek volunteers stationed in the villages of Tristeno and Greveniti to head towards Kryovrysi.

== Battle ==
At 2:00 a.m. on 26 November, the Corps of Greek Red Shirts assaulted the Ottoman positions on Mount Driskos in a surprise attack. The Ottoman garrison which numbered 600 soldiers and 2 artillery pieces engaged in a disorganized retreat towards Ioannina, abandoning large amounts of materiel. The battle lasted until 8:00 a.m., whereupon the Garibaldini were able to secure the Ottoman camp on Driskos; taking shelter in the village of Mazi and the Koimiseos Theotokou monastery. Cretan volunteer units continued to clash with the Ottomans until midday around the Zygos height. By the afternoon, Driskos had been augmented by the rest of the Redshirts and 270 Cretans under Kriaris and Makris who stationed themselves in the Lingiades and Giobourtza villages. In the meantime, Garibaldi's wife and daughter organized a field hospital at Sotiros monastery, in the Greek rear. A total of 200 Ottomans were killed in the initial assault.

On 27 November the Ottomans regrouped in the villages of Koutselio and Vasiliki, reaching some 7,000–10,000 men with the arrival of the 19th Ottoman Division, including a powerful searchlight, 2 mitrailleuses, and a battery of field artillery pieces captured from the Hellenic Army in the aftermath of the Battle of Sorovich. They counterattacked from the direction of Tzoura in the early morning hours, with additional artillery support from the Kastitsa and Yanya Island batteries. At 11:30 a.m., Driskos was reinforced by an additional unit of Cretan volunteers. Matthaiopoulos commanded two companies of Cretans to occupy the positions north of Mazia after realizing that the Greek right flank was completely exposed. A parallel counter-attack by another Cretan unit pushed the Ottomans from the shore of Lake Pamvotida and prevented them from performing an amphibious landing. The Greeks held their ground and fighting ceased upon nightfall, but Makris was killed and three officers, including Romas' deputy Bardopoulos, were wounded.

On 28 November, the Ottomans launched an attack on the Heights 1078 and 1053 held by Cretan volunteers, the assault was supported by artillery fire from a battery which had been moved to the caravanserai of Lefkas. At 7:00 a.m., the Redshirt left flank which faced the brunt of the Ottoman attack was reinforced by 44 men and a single 75 mm Schneider-Danglis 06/09 mountain gun. At 9:00 a.m., Matthaiopoulos hastily dispatched two companies stationed in the village of Greveniti and units of volunteers located in Metsovo to Driskos. Fierce fighting including hand-to-hand combat took place across the front line, as the Ottomans deployed a unit of Albanian irregulars. The Greeks began experiencing a serious shortage in ammunition as the supply convoy from Grevena failed to arrive on time. Romas, Bardopoulos and many other Greek officers including Captain Lorentzos Mavilis were injured, leaving Peppino Garibaldi to assume command.

Just before he received a second, and ultimately mortal injury to his head, according to eyewitness Nikos Karvounis, Mavilis is said to have exclaimed:

I was expecting honors from this war, but not the honor to sacrifice myself for Greece!

The Greek army suffered heavy casualties, while the Ottomans gained momentum and funneled fresh troops to the battlefield. The Redshirts struggled to contain the Ottoman attack on the left flank and they began to retreat at 11:00 a.m. The Ottomans captured the Koimiseos Theotokou monastery and one hour later took over the Heights 1078 and 1053. Believing that the Metsovo Detachment was at serious risk of being outflanked, Matthaiopoulos ordered it to withdraw to Metsovo through the caravanserai of Kamber Agha, at midday. Garibaldi's battalions, which had played a limited role in the fighting, covered the Greek retreat and evacuated the wounded. After crossing the Baldouma bridge the Redshirts and Greek volunteers fled in panic towards Metsovo. Greek reinforcements from Tristeno and other locations arrived at Driskos after the Greek defensive lines had already collapsed and therefore they likewise withdrew.

== Aftermath ==
Greek casualties in the Battle of Driskos numbered between 200 and 400 killed and approximately 400 wounded, while the Ottomans lost between 1,000 and 2,000 killed and wounded. Ricciotti Garibaldi attributed the Greek defeat to poor communication between the Garibaldini and the Army of Epirus. A number of Redshirts later claimed that the Greek state had intentionally left their unit exposed to a numerically superior force and poorly supplied so as to deny it the glory it had once attained at the Battle of Domokos. The Neapoli-Siatista Evzone Detachment arrived in Metsovo several days later, replacing the casualties the Metsovo Detachment had suffered.

On 30 November, Sapountzakis ordered Ricciotti Garibaldi and Matthaiopoulos to regroup their forces and retake Driskos or at least attempt to distract the enemy in that direction. Garibaldi claimed that the Redshirts were in no position to carry out such an order after suffering heavy losses, while the Metsovo Detachment took up new positions on the Itia-Demati-Gotista line.The same day, Garibaldi disbanded the Redshirts and the volunteers began demobilizing on 3 December. Approximately 300 Greek Redshirts under Romas remained in active service. Greek Redshirts were said to have been received with hostility by the Greek society, while Italian volunteers were transported to their hometowns on mail trains and under police surveillance, a treatment usually reserved for criminals. The Battle of Driskos marked the last intervention of the Garibaldini into Greek expansionist conflicts. Many, including Ricciotti, later turned to fascism, while a group of dissenters under Cipriano Facchinetti had deserted the movement over its stance on the Albanian Question, generating an uproar of negative press.

Following the conclusion of the Greek campaign in Macedonia, the Army of Epirus received considerable reinforcements. This enabled it to capture the Yanya Fortified Area in the aftermath of the Battle of Bizani (19–21 February 1913). By May 1913, the numerically inferior Ottomans had suffered a series of serious defeats to the League's armies on all fronts. The League had captured most of the Ottoman Empire's European territories and was rapidly approaching Constantinople. On 30 May, the two sides signed the Treaty of London which granted the League's members all Ottoman lands west of a line stretching from Enos on the Aegean Sea to north of Midia on the Black Sea, as well as Crete. The fate of Albania and the Aegean islands occupied by Greece was to be determined by the Great Powers.

== Notes ==
Footnotes

Citations
