= Charalambos Katsimitros =

Greek general

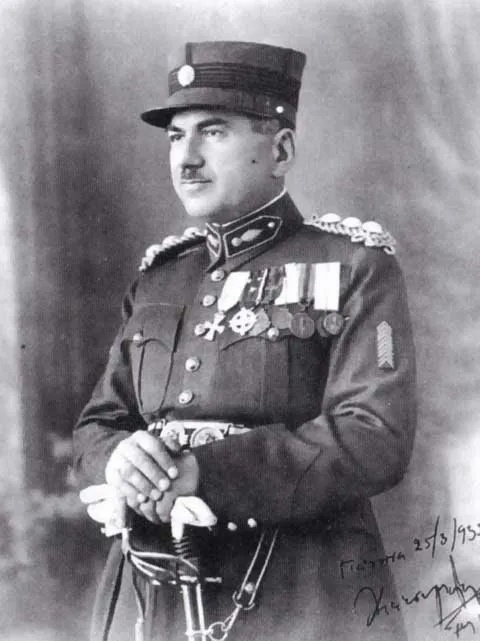
- Katsimitros in uniform

Minister of Agriculture
- In office 16 April – 20 September 1941
- Prime Minister: Georgios Tsolakoglou

Minister of Labour
- In office 16 April – 16 May 1941
- Prime Minister: Georgios Tsolakoglou

Personal details
- Born: 1886 Kleistos, Evrytania, Kingdom of Greece
- Died: 20 February 1962 (aged 75 – 76) Athens, Kingdom of Greece

Military service
- Allegiance: Kingdom of Greece; Greek State
- Branch/service: Hellenic Army
- Rank: Lieutenant general
- Commands: 7th Infantry Division; 9th Infantry Division; 8th Infantry Division
- Battles/wars: Balkan Wars; First Balkan War; Second Balkan War; World War I; Macedonian front; Greco-Turkish War (1919-1922); Battle of Hasan Bel; Second World War; Greco-Italian War; Battle of Elaia-Kalamas; German invasion of Greece
- Awards: Cross of Valour; War Cross; Medal of Military Merit

Charalambos Katsimitros (Greek: Χαράλαμπος Κατσιμήτρος; 1886–1962) was a Greek general who distinguished himself during the Italian invasion of Greece.

== Early life and career ==
Katsimitros entered the Army in 1904. He participated in the Balkan Wars as a 2nd Lieutenant in 1913 and fought in the Macedonian front with the rank of captain during the First World War. With the rank of major he took part and was wounded in the Battle of Hasan Bel, in the Asia Minor Campaign. During the following years he was promoted to senior staff positions within the Army Ministry. In 1936 he was promoted to major general and served as commander of 7th Division in Drama, 9th Division in Kozani and on 9 February 1938 he was put in command of the 8th Infantry Division of Epirus based in Ioannina. After Albania was occupied by Italy in the spring of 1939, he made great efforts to prepare for a possible Italian invasion via Albania, by constructing fortifications and familiarizing his men with the harsh local terrain.

== Greco-Italian war ==
On the outbreak of the war, Katsimitros' unit was fully mobilized, reinforced with an additional regiment, and deployed to meet the Italians. He decided to organize forward defense and hold the Elaia (Kalpaki) position, despite opposite instructions from the General Staff, and succeeded in defending it against repeated attacks until 9 November. In this way he managed to contain the Italian offensive in the Epirus sector, and bought valuable time for the Greek reinforcements to arrive.

When the Greek counter-offensive began, Katsimitros led his division into Albania, after forcing the pass of Kakavia. After the German attack on Greece began, he retreated with the rest of the Army of Epirus, and the capitulation found him in Ioannina.

== Collaboration and post-war career ==
Along with other prominent generals, Katsimitros became a member of the first collaborationist government of General Georgios Tsolakoglou, serving from April to September 1941, first as Minister for Labour and then for Agriculture. After Liberation, he was tried and sentenced to 5 years imprisonment for this, but received a royal pardon in 1949 was promoted to lieutenant general for his service during the Greco-Italian War and the Battle of Greece.

Katsimitros died in Athens in February 1962.
