= 11th Infantry Division (Greece) =

11th Infantry Division XI Μεραρχία Πεζικού (XI ΜΠ)
- Flag and Emblem of the 11th Infantry Division
- Active: 1913–1916; 1920–1941; 1945–2004
- Country: Greece
- Branch: Hellenic Army
- Type: Infantry
- Size: Division
- Garrison/HQ: Thessaloniki, after 1951 Kavala
- Motto(s): Alone Or With Others' Support; ΜΟΝΟΣ ΚΑΙ ΜΕΤΑ ΠΟΛΛΩΝ
- Engagements: Greco-Turkish War (1919–1922); Battle of Dumlupınar; Greco-Italian War; Greek Civil War

The 11th Infantry Division (Greek: XI Μεραρχία Πεζικού (XI ΜΠ); XI Merarchía Pezikoú) was an infantry division of the Hellenic Army.

== History ==
It was the first division to be founded after the Balkan Wars, when the peacetime army was greatly expanded. Initially formed at Kozani, in December 1913 it was ordered transferred to Thessaloniki as part of III Army Corps. At the time it comprised the 13th, 27th and 28th Infantry Regiments.

In August 1916, the division under Col. Nikolaos Trikoupis remained loyal to the royal government and tried to oppose the Venizelist uprising that led to the establishment of the Provisional Government of National Defence, but was thwarted by the intervention of the French Army. With the subsequent disarmament of the loyalist army, the division was disbanded in 1916/17.

=== Asia Minor Campaign ===
Following the Greek landing at Smyrna and the creation of the Smyrna Zone, on 8 July 1920 a new division was formed at Crete, comprising the 9th Cretan Regiment, the 16th Infantry Regiment, and the 17th Infantry Regiment, under Colonel Antonios Papanikolaou. Transferred to Anatolia, it was headquartered in the area of Magnesia and named after it the Magnesia Division (Μεραρχία Μαγνησίας).

As part of the Smyrna Army Corps, it participated in the Greek Summer Offensive of 1920, moving from Magnesia to Balikesir and Bandirma. From 2–12 September 1920, the division was moved to İzmit, where it relieved the 242nd British Brigade at the İzmit Front on 21 September. There the division took part in the operations in the areas of Kandra, Baktedjik, and Sabandja.

After the Venizelist defeat in the November 1920 elections, the new royalist government renamed the division as the 11th Infantry Division, now under the III Army Corps (the likewise renamed Smyrna Corps). The division fought in the March 1921 operations towards Kovalıca and Avgin, and in the Battle of Sakarya in August 1921. After Sakarya and the retreat of the Army of Asia Minor, the 11th Division held the northernmost flank of the Greek front, from Kios on the Marmara Sea to Bilecik, a front of over 60 km. Following the Battle of Dumlupinar in 1922 and the collapse of the Greek front, the division was encircled and almost completely destroyed.

The 11th Division was then reformed as part of the Army of the Evros, in the area of Karaağaç. Following the Treaty of Lausanne, in late 1923 the division was moved to its new peacetime headquarters in Thessaloniki, again under III Corps.

=== Greco-Italian War ===
Following the Italian invasion of Greece on 28 October 1940 and the Greek mobilization, the 11th Infantry Division was reformed at Thessaloniki, comprising the 13th Infantry Regiment, 16th Infantry Regiment, 50th Infantry Regiment, 66th Infantry Regiment, and the 11th Artillery Regiment, along with other support units. During its formation, it remained under III Corps control. On 1 November it was moved to the heights of Kozani, and on 9 November to Mount Grammos. On 10 November it assumed the Pindos sector of the Greek front, under II Army Corps control. On the next day, 16th and 66th Regiments were detached and placed under direct Corps control.

In 14–21 November, the division participated in the capture of the Grammos massif, and particularly distinguished itself during the capture of Height 1878. On 1 December, the division captured the Frashër heights 1555, 1450, and 1550, opening up the passes against determined Alpini resistance. In the morning of 4 December the division captured the Mali i Potomit height, catching the Italians by surprise and capturing 22 POWs. Two days later, the village of Koprencka was captured, and on 10–13 December, the Italian forces were pushed back from the Koprencka, Galina, Height 1119, and Kresta heights. During this battle, the division captured 15 machine guns, 50 light machine guns, 200 rifles, and other quantities of material. On 23–25 December, the division was engaged in capturing the Radeshi, Molashi, and Verskaia heights, against determined resistance from an Italian infantry battalion, an Alpini battalion, and a machine gun battalion, assisted by 75mm artillery. After hard combat, especially during the night, the heights were captured, along with 25 POWs. On 30 December, the Sirakut ridge was captured, with the Italians leaving 10 dead and 11 captured.

On the morning of 17 January 1941, after intercepting Italian signals that revealed the enemy's unpreparedness, the division exploited the heavy fog and captured the Dras e Klis. Over 600 Italians, including the commander of the Italian 77th Regiment, were taken prisoner. Three days later, a 12-man patrol of III/50 Battalion on reconnaissance of the Kada height, chanced upon the Italian encampment; finding the Italian troops unawares, the commanding sergeant ordered an attack, which threw the encampment into panic. Italian losses were 71 prisoners and 5 dead, including the local Italian commander. On 25 January, the division captured Mali Spadarit, where the Greek lines stabilized. On 29 January, an Italian attack on the division's extreme right captured Height 1598, but the height was recaptured the next day. Apart from this event, the period of February 1941 until the beginning of the Italian Spring Offensive on 6 March 1941 was relatively quiet, marked by artillery duels and patrol activity.

On 6 March, following an hour-long artillery barrage, four Italian battalions attacked the division's positions on Mali Spadarit, while another battalion attacked Height 245. The Italian objective was to capture these heights, which protected left flank of the Greek position on the Klisura Pass, on the same day. The attack failed, but was repeated on the next day, again with intensive artillery support, against the entire front of the 11th Division. The main Italian attack was again against Mali Spadarit, with supporting attacks on heights 931 and 845. Although the division's men were forced back locally, the reserves were able to restore the Greek line. Following heavy casualties on both sides, the Italian attacks on the 11th Division's sector stopped after that, and were reduced to artillery and air force bombardments and mutual reconnaissance patrol activity.

When the German invasion of Greece began on 6 April, the division was dispersed: its bulk, with the 13th and 50th Regiments, were still at their old positions, while the detached 66th Regiment was at Mount Tomorr, at the junction of the II and III Corps. The division followed the slow retreat of the Greek army from Albania; when the Greek Epirus army capitulated on 22 April 1941, the bulk of the division was in the area of Metsovo, while 66th Regiment at the Burazavi Bridge.

During the Greco-Italian conflict, the division suffered 450 dead (18 officers), 1,000 wounded (38 officers), and 24 missing in action (1 officer).

=== Greek Civil War ===
The 11th Infantry Division was reformed in March 1945, after Liberation, with the 31st, 32nd and 33rd Brigades at Thessaloniki, as part of the Superior Military Command of Macedonia and Thrace. With the outbreak of the Greek Civil War, the division came under the control of II Corps, and in 1946 took part in anti-partisan operations at Mount Beles and in the Krousia Mountains, Vertiskos, and Mount Paiko areas. In 1947 the division participated in operations in the areas of Koziakas, Mount Vermion, Mount Chasia, the Pierian Mountains, Beles, Paiko and Kaimakchalan. In 1948 the division conducted operations in Vermion, Paiko, Kaimakchalan, the Pierian and Krousia Mts, Kerdyllia, Vertiskos, and Mount Grammos. The division particularly distinguished itself in the repulsion of the Communist Democratic Army of Greece (DSE) attacks on Edessa and Naoussa. In 1949, the division cleared Kaimakchalan of DSE forces for the third and final time. Following heavy fighting in the Fanos–Skra–Archangelos area, Mount Paiko was likewise finally cleared; subsequently the division was engaged in the suppression of Communist resistance in the Vermion–Chalcidice area.

The division then fought in the war's final battles in August 1949. The division participated in the capture of Vitsi, where it suffered 50 dead and 163 wounded (13 officers), in exchange for 422 killed and 115 captured DSE fighters, along with the capture of large amounts of weapons and ammunition. The division was then assembled in the Metsovo area under I Army Corps command (18 August), and took part in the final storming of the last Communist stronghold at Grammos.

=== Subsequent history ===
After the conclusion of major military operations, the division moved first for regrouping to Verroia, coming again under III Corps command on 6 April 1950. In January 1951 it moved to its new peacetime headquarters at Kavala, with the 50th Infantry Regiment (former 32nd Brigade) and the 65th Infantry Regiment (former 33rd Brigade). From 1 August 1960 to January 1962, the division also comprised the 29th Infantry Regiment; it was replaced on 1 November 1962 by the 37th Infantry Regiment.

The division was disbanded in 2004.

== Wartime commanders ==
- 8–20 July 1920: Infantry Colonel Antonios Papanikolaou
- 21 July – 24 August 1920: Infantry Colonel Petros Karakasonis
- 24 August 1920 – February 1921: Major General Panagiotis Gargalidis
- February – May 1921: Artillery Colonel Efstathios Katsikogiannis
- May 1921 – 30 August 1922: Artillery Colonel Nikolaos Kladas
- 1922–1923: Major General Dimitrios Katheniotis
- 28 October – 1 November 1940: Major General Christos Kavrakos
  - 1–15 November 1940: Acting commander, replacing the ill Kavrakos, the division's Artillery Commander, Colonel Georgios Kotsalos
- 15 November – 22 December 1940: Major General Nikolaos Tsipouras
- 23 December 1940 – April 1941: Cavalry Colonel Sokratis Dimaratos

== Emblem and Motto ==
The emblem and motto of the 11th Infantry Division is a lion, symbolizing dynamism, strength and awe.

The regiment's motto is Alone Or With Others' Support (Greek: ΜΟΝΟΣ ΚΑΙ ΜΕΤΑ ΠΟΛΛΩΝ, romanized: Mónos Ké Metá Pollón). The phrase is an excerpt from the Ephebic Oath, an oath sworn by young men of Classical Athens upon induction into the military - "If anyone tries to overthrow the constitution or disobeys it, I will not permit him, but will come to its defence alone or with others' support." (Greek: «Ου καταισχυνώ όπλα τα ιερά ουδ' εγκαταλείψω τον παραστάτην ότω αν στοιχήσω· αμυνώ δε υπέρ ιερών και οσίων και μόνος και μετά πολλών»).

== Sources ==
- Συνοπτική Ἰστορία ΧΙ Μεραρχίας [Brief History of the 11th Division] (in Greek), Hellenic Army History Directorate, December 1962
- Ἐπίτομος ἱστορία τῆς εἰς Μικράν Ἀσίαν ἐκστρατείας 1919–1922 [Concise history of the Campaign in Asia Minor 1919–1922] (in Greek). Athens: Hellenic Army History Directorate. 1967.
- Επίτομη ιστορία του Ελληνοϊταλικού και Ελληνογερμανικού Πολέμου 1940–1941 (Επιχειρήσεις Στρατού Ξηράς) [Concise history of the Greco-Italian and Greco-German War 1940–1941 (Army Operations)] (in Greek). Athens: Hellenic Army History Directorate. 1985.
- Η ιστορία της οργάνωσης του Ελληνικού Στρατού, 1821–1954 [The history of the organization of the Hellenic Army, 1821–1954] (in Greek). Athens: Hellenic Army History Directorate. 2005. ISBN 960-7897-45-5.
