= Këlcyrë =

- Municipality
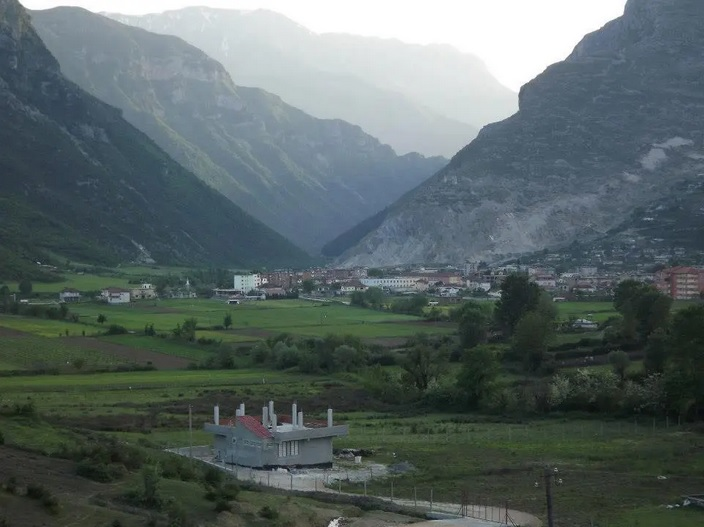

- Emblem

- Location within Albania
- Coordinates: 40.313°N 20.192°E
- Country: Albania
- County: Gjirokastër

Government
  - Mayor: Klement Ndoni (PS)

Area
  - Municipality: 304.86 km^{2} (117.71 sq mi)
- Elevation: 176 m (577 ft)

Population (2011)
  - Municipality: 6,113
  - Municipality density: 20.05/km^{2} (51.93/sq mi)
  - Administrative unit: 2,651
- Time zone: UTC+1 (CET)
  - Summer (DST): UTC+2 (CEST)
- Postal Code: 6402
- Area Code: (0)875
- Website: www.bashkiakelcyre.gov.al

Këlcyrë (Albanian definite form: Këlcyra) is a town and a municipality in southern Albania, located on the bank of the river Vjosë. It was formed at the 2015 local government reform by the merger of the former municipalities Ballaban, Dishnicë, Këlcyrë and Sukë, that became municipal units. The seat of the municipality is the town Këlcyrë. The total population is 6,113 (2011 census), in a total area of 304.86 km^{2}. The population of the former municipality at the 2011 census was 2,651. The Vjosë forms a canyon near the town, known as the Këlcyrë Gorge.

== Municipality ==
The municipal unit consists of the town Këlcyrë and the villages Fshat Këlcyrë, Sukë, Dishnicë, Mbrezhdan, Maleshovë, Limar, Toshkëz, Ballaban, Tolar, Çorrogunjë, Leskaj and Kala.

The village of Maleshovë traditionally consists of three neighbourhoods, one Christian, one Muslim and one with families of both religions.

== Name ==
The Byzantine Suda lexicon, writes that the Romans called the forts at the passes Kleisoúrai (Medieval Greek: Κλεισοῦραι), which is the Medieval Greek rendering of the Latin word clausura in plural; the latter recorded for the first time in an order given by emperor Theodosius II in 443, while the former in the Strategikon of Maurice and the works of Procopius (early 6th c.) and Theophylact Simocatta (early 7th c.). By the late 7th century, the term came to be applied to more extensive frontier districts of Byzantium, distinct from the larger themata. Regardless of this particular evolution, the mountain passes continued to be called kleisoúrai (Medieval Greek: κλεισοῦραι), but sometimes the word was also used to describe a 'man-made fortified pass'.

The word kleisoúra (Medieval Greek: κλεισοῦρα) was eventually borrowed by all Balkan peoples, becoming the root of several place-names. For instance, Klisura (Plovdiv Province), Klisura (Blagoevgrad Province) and the Klisura Monastery in Bulgaria, Klisura (Demir Kapija Municipality) in North Macedonia, Kleisoura (Kastoria) in Greece, etc.. The name of Këlcyrë comes from the same root; recorded as Clausura in 1327 and Qlisura in an Ottoman tax register of 1432. The nearby mountain pass is known as the Gorge of Këlcyrë.

== History ==
During the Second Macedonian War against the Romans, the troops of Phillip V and Athenagoras of Macedon attempted to delay the Roman consul, Titus Quinctius Flamininus. The Macedonians had secured the passage and then blocked the Roman advance in 198 BC. A shepherd is said to have led the Roman troops through the mountains, so that they could attack the Macedonians in the narrow gorge of two sides and destroy them. The Macedonians had been decisively defeated a first time. Later, the Romans used the route through the gorge of modern Këlcyrë and built a small settlement.

To control this passage, a castle was built in the 13th century. When the town was incorporated in the Kingdom of Albania in the late 13th century it was ruled by the Muzaka family. The correspondence of the Roman Curia with the Albanian nobility indicates that in 1319 it was ruled by Count Mentul Muzaka. After its capture by the Byzantine army, the Albanian population rebelled against Byzantine rule in 1335 and captured the fortress of the town. In 1432 the town was captured by Albanian rebels who defeated and expelled the Ottomans from the area.

The Turks advanced and built in the 19th century also a seraglio. At this time Këlcyrë experienced its bloom as a key trading center between Berat, Korça and Gjirokastra.

The capture of Klisura Pass (6–11 January 1941) was one of the most important victories of the Greek Army during the Greek-Italian War.

== Today ==
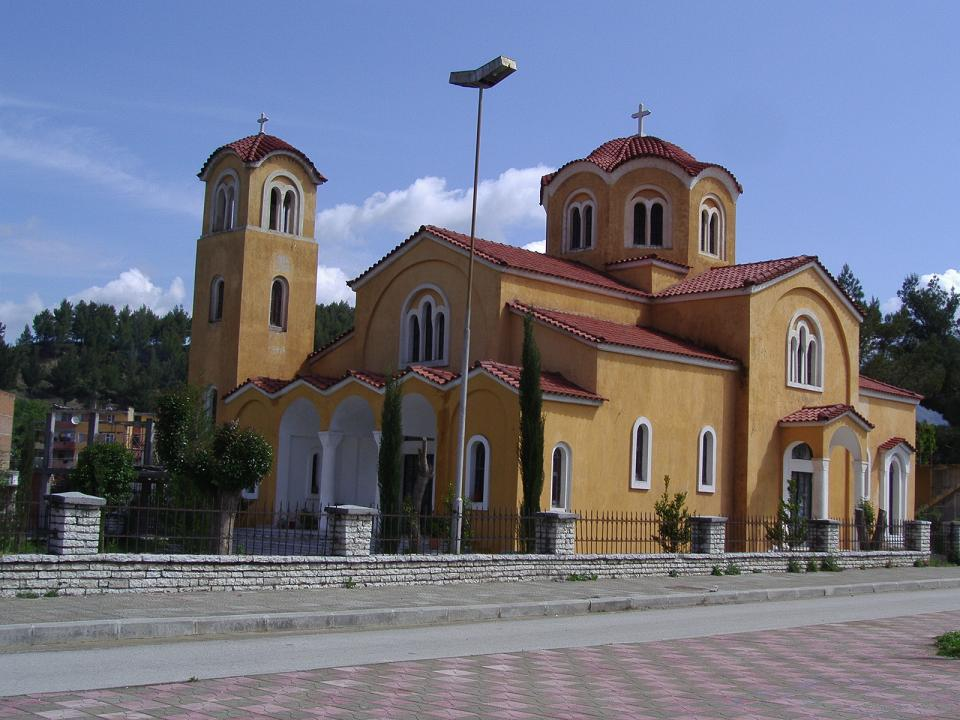
View of the Eastern Orthodox Church of Këlcyrë

The Kelcyre Castle is a Tourist Attraction nearby the city. The road is the main access route through the gorge that connects Këlcyrë with Tepelenë and other centers of Albania. To the south, the road continues to Përmet in the capital district and then to Greece. The road leading to the north in the direction of Berat is paved only a few kilometers, and navigation over long distances is very difficult. Around Këlcyrë there are some age-old Eastern Orthodox churches.

== Notable people ==
- Ali Këlcyra, politician
- Sejfulla Malëshova, writer and politician, founder of the Albanian League of Writers and Artists in 1945.
- Veli bej Këlcyra, signatory of the Albanian Declaration of Independence.

== See also ==
- Kelcyre Castle
- Gorge of Këlcyrë
- Tourism in Albania
- History of Albania
