= Efstathios Katsikogiannis =

Greek Army officer

Major General Efstathios Katsikogiannis
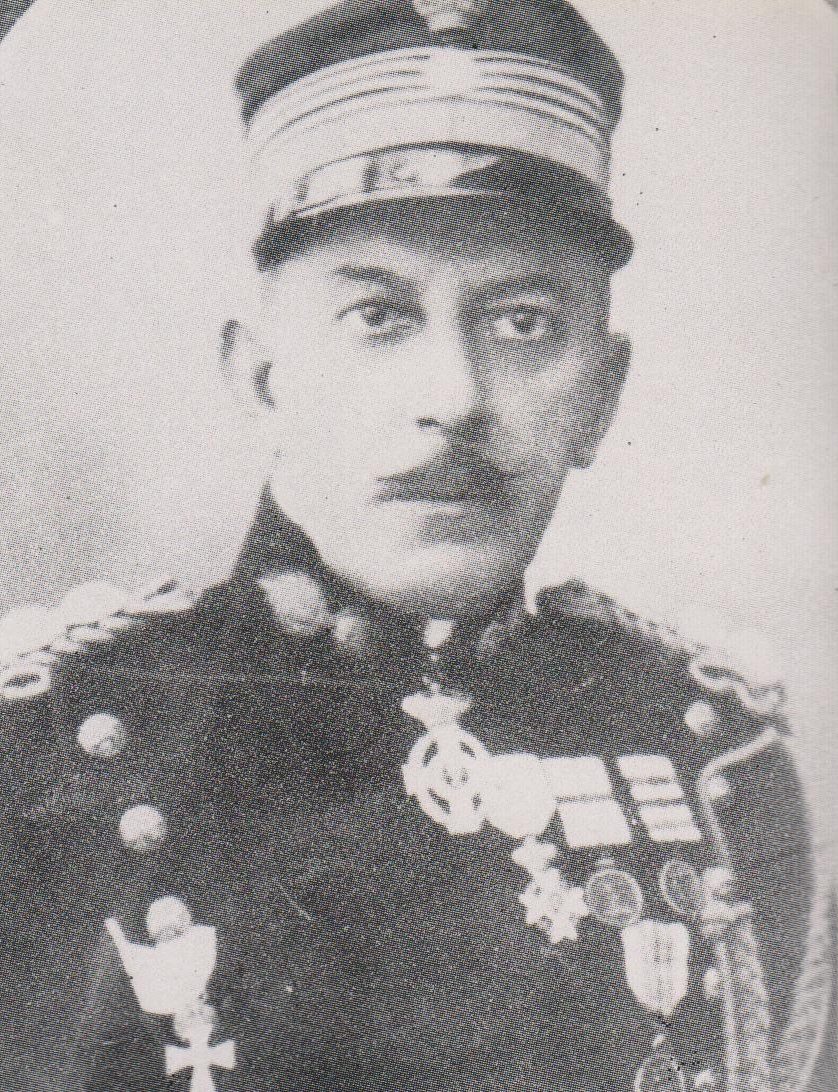
- Efstathios Katsikogiannis as a colonel
- Native name: Ευστάθιος Κατσικογιάννης
- Born: c. 1869; Athens, Kingdom of Greece
- Allegiance: Kingdom of Greece
- Branch: Hellenic Army
- Service years: ?–1922
- Rank: Major General
- Commands: 11th Infantry Division
- Conflicts: Greco-Turkish War (1897); Balkan Wars; First Balkan War; Second Balkan War; Greco-Turkish War (1919-1922)

Efstathios Katsikogiannis (Greek: Ευστάθιος Κατσικογιάννης) was a Hellenic Army officer who reached the rank of major general.

He was born in Athens in around 1869, to a family of armatoloi of the Valtos region. He was commissioned an artillery officer in the Hellenic Army, and fought in the Greco-Turkish War of 1897, the Balkan Wars of 1912–13, and the Greco-Turkish War of 1919–1922, where he commanded the 11th Infantry Division.

He retired, on his own request, with the rank of major general, on 7/20 December 1922.
