= Ohi Day =

Holiday in Greece and Cyprus on 28 October

Ohi Day (Επέτειος του Όχι)
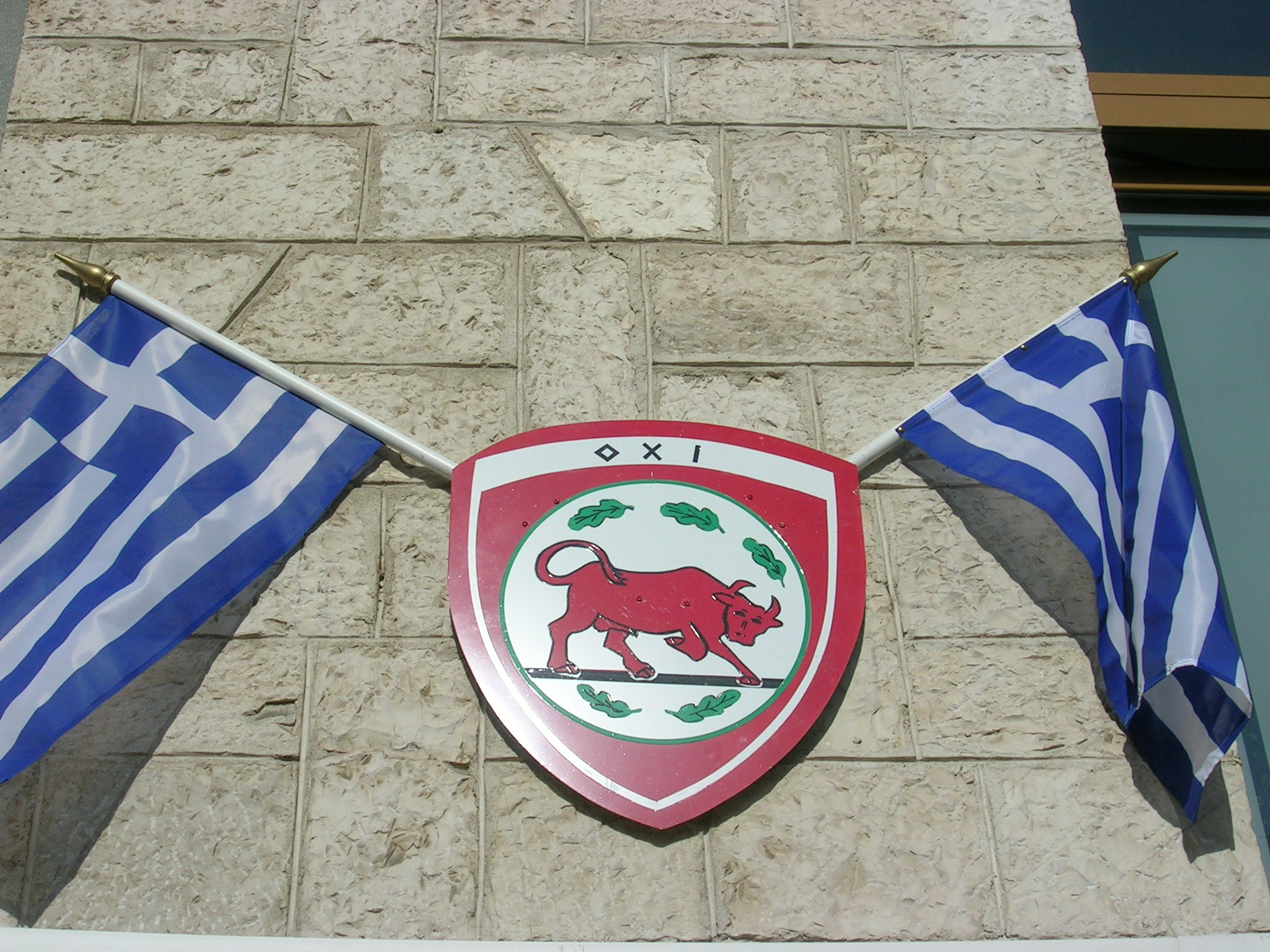
- Emblem of the 8th Infantry Division, the first unit to face the Italian invasion: its motto is Ohi.
- Official name: Επέτειος του «Όχι» (Anniversary of the "No")
- Observed by: Greece, Cyprus, and the Greek diaspora
- Significance: Greece's rejection of the Italian ultimatum of 28 October 1940 and its entry into the Second World War
- Celebrations: Family reunions, military and student parades
- Observances: Church services; feast of the Protection of the Theotokos (Church of Greece)
- Date: 28 October
- Frequency: Annual
- First time: 28 October 1941 (unofficial); 28 October 1944 (official)
- Related to: Greek Independence Day

Ohi Day (/ˈoʊhiː/; Greek: Επέτειος του Όχι, romanized: Epétios tou Óhi, lit. 'Anniversary of the No'; Greek pronunciation: [epe'tios tu o'çi]) is a national holiday observed annually on October 28th in Greece, Cyprus and the Greek diaspora. It commemorates the rejection by Ioannis Metaxas, who governed as a dictator under the 4th of August Regime, of the ultimatum that Benito Mussolini's government presented in the early hours of October 28, 1940. Italian forces invaded Greece from Albania that morning, beginning the Greco-Italian War and bringing Greece into the Second World War.

The holiday takes its name from the word όχι ("no"), which became the popular emblem of the refusal, although Metaxas replied in French and appears never to have used the word itself. The anniversary was first marked in occupied Athens in 1941 as an act of resistance, and the government of Georgios Papandreou proclaimed it a national holiday in October 1944. It is marked by a military parade in Thessaloniki, student parades in Athens and other cities, and special church services. Since 1952, the Church of Greece has also celebrated the feast of the Protection of the Theotokos on the same day.

== Background ==
Shortly after 03:00 on 28 October 1940, the Italian ambassador in Athens, Emanuele Grazzi, delivered an ultimatum from the Italian dictator, Benito Mussolini, to Greece's leader, Ioannis Metaxas, at his residence in Kifissia. The ultimatum demanded that Greece allow Axis forces to cross the Greek-Albanian border and occupy certain "strategic positions" within Greek territory, or else face the prospect of war. Metaxas refused, replying in French, then the language of diplomacy: "Alors, c'est la guerre" ("Then, it is war").

Italian forces stationed in Albania, then under Italian rule, attacked the Greek frontier in Epirus at 05:30, half an hour before the ultimatum expired. The Greek army halted the invasion by mid-November 1940 and then counter-attacked into southern Albania. Thereafter, Greek forces were overwhelmed by the German invasion of April 1941, and the country remained under Axis occupation until the liberation of Athens in October 1944.

== The word "ochi" ==
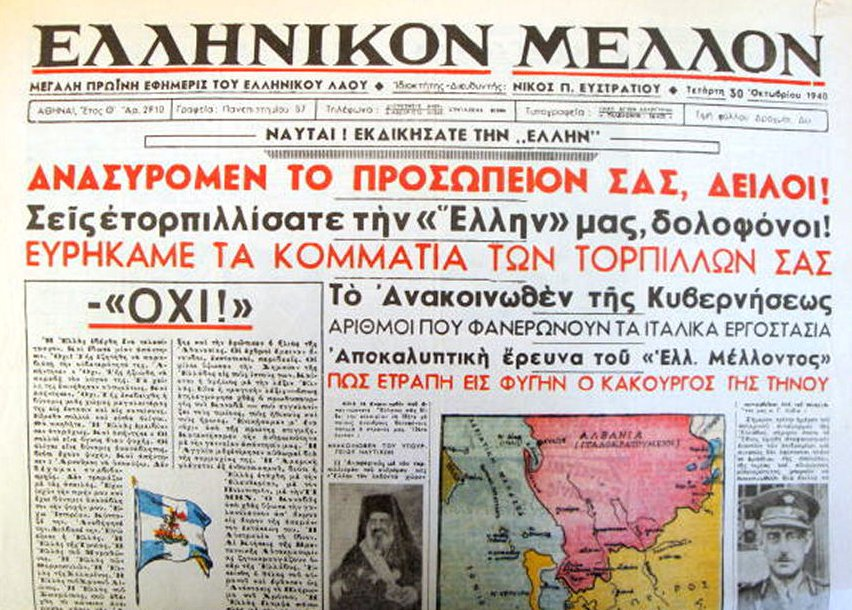
Front page of Ellinikon Mellon on 30 October 1940, with the editorial headed "ΟΧΙ!"

The single word ΟΧΙ ("No!") became a popular symbol of the Greek refusal of occupation by Axis forces. Metaxas's actual reply was in French, and the academic Philip Hager notes that he "appears to have never used the word 'no'".

The word entered the Greek press in the first days of the war. On 30 October 1940, the Athens newspaper Ellinikon Mellon (transl. Hellenic Future) ran a front-page editorial by its publisher and editor, Nikos P. Efstratiou, under the headline "ΟΧΙ!". Ellinikon Mellon is often credited as the first newspaper to use the word in this way, although this has not been conclusively verified. Other papers also adopted the word; for example, the front page of Kathimerini on 21 November 1940 used the headline "Πελώριον Όχι" ("A colossal No").

== History of the commemoration ==
=== Under the occupation ===
The anniversary of Metaxas's refusal was first marked in Greece on 28 October 1941, during the Axis occupation, as an act of resistance to the occupying forces. The newly founded National Liberation Front (EAM) called for demonstrations, and other resistance groups distributed leaflets. In Athens, women laid flowers at the Tomb of the Unknown Soldier, and students marched from the University of Athens towards Syntagma Square. Clashes with Italian cavalry followed, and seven students were arrested.

=== National holiday ===
After liberation, the government of Georgios Papandreou established October 28th as a national holiday by decree on 24 October 1944. Papandreou announced that the government had proclaimed the day a national holiday "comparable to the 25th of March 1821", which is the anniversary of the start of the Greek War of Independence. The first official celebration, on 28 October 1944, included a parade attended by Papandreou. Dimitris Zazas of the Library of the Hellenic Parliament describes the decree as the state's ratification of a commemoration that had already been established from below.

=== Church feast ===
In 1952, the Holy Synod of the Church of Greece moved the feast of the Protection of the Theotokos (Agia Skepi) from October 1st to October 28th, which gave the national anniversary a religious dimension.

== Observance ==
=== Greece ===
Ohi Day is an official public holiday in Greece. The main commemorative event is a military parade in Thessaloniki, attended by the President of the Republic and other officials. In Athens and other municipalities, schoolchildren parade instead, and public and private buildings fly the Greek flag. In Thessaloniki, the celebrations begin on October 26th with a feast dedicated to the city's patron saint, Saint Demetrius. The student parade is held there a day early, on October 27th, to make room for the military parade the following day.

Each school's flag is customarily carried by the pupil with the best academic record. According to Philip Hager, this custom has drawn nationalist objections on occasions when the flag-bearer was a child of immigrants.

Military parades in Greece date back to the 1870s and became an integral part of national celebrations in 1930. Student parades were incorporated into the tradition later, under the Metaxas regime.

=== Cyprus and the diaspora ===
October 28th is an official public holiday in Cyprus, and is also observed by Greek-speaking communities around the world.

=== Disruptions ===
On October 28, 2011, during protests against the government's austerity measures, demonstrators blocked the route of the Thessaloniki military parade and heckled President Karolos Papoulias. The parade was subsequently cancelled, which United Press International described as the first such occurrence in holiday's history in Greece.

In 2020, the government of Greece cancelled the military and student parades due to the COVID-19 pandemic. Most parades resumed in 2021, although some student parades in northern Greece were cancelled again.

== In popular culture ==
The war of 1940 is the subject of a number of Greek films, including the following:

- Kontserto gia polyvola (1967)
- Oxi (1969)
- The Battle of Crete (1970)
- Lieutenant Natasha (1970)
- Oi gennaioi tou Vorra (1970)
- The Mediterranean in Flames (1970)
- Submarine Papanikolis (1971)
- October 28th, Time 5:30 (1975)

The title track of Sabaton's 2010 album Coat of Arms is about the start of the Greco-Italian War.

== See also ==
- Greco-Italian War
- Battle of Greece
- Axis occupation of Greece
- Greek Independence Day
- Protection of the Theotokos
