= Battle of Elaia–Kalamas =

1940 Greco-Italian War battle

- Part of the Greco-Italian War
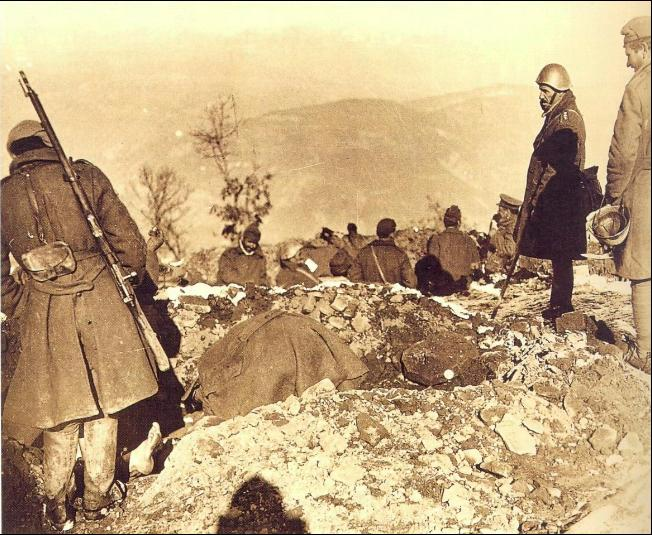
- Trench construction in Elaia–Kalamas line by Greek military personnel, March 1939
Date	2–8 November 1940 (6 days)
Location	Epirus 39°35′12″N 20°08′32″E
Result	Greek victory

Belligerents
Italy	Greece

Commanders and leaders
(Kingdom of Italy) Carlo Rossi (XXV Army Corps) (Kingdom of Italy) Licurgo Zannini (23rd Division) (Kingdom of Italy) Giovanni Magli (131st Division)	(Kingdom of Greece) Charalambos Katsimitros (8th Infantry Division) (Kingdom of Greece) Nikolaos Lioumbas (Thesprotia Sector) (Kingdom of Greece) Dimitrios Giatzis (Kalamas Sector) (Kingdom of Greece) Georgios Dres (Negrades Sector)

Units involved
23rd Infantry Division; 51st Infantry Division; 131st Armoured Division	8th Infantry Division

Strength
42,000; 170 light tanks 76 guns 400 aircraft	15 battalions 56 guns (14 batteries)

Casualties and losses
28 October – 5 November: 160 killed 41 missing 561 wounded	1–5 November: 59 killed 208 wounded
- Location within Greece

The Battle of Elaia–Kalamas (Greek: Μάχη Ελαίας-Καλαμά, romanized: Machi Elaias-Kalama) took place in Epirus on 2–8 November 1940. The battle was fought between the Greeks and the Italians during the initial stage of the Greco-Italian War in World War II. The Royal Italian Army, deployed on the Greek-Albanian border, launched an offensive against Greece on 28 October 1940. The main thrust of the Italian invasion occurred in the Epirus sector, with a further flanking move through the Pindus mountains. In Epirus, the Greeks held the Kalpaki (Elaia)–Kalamas river line, and, even though the Greek army was outnumbered, the local Greek forces under Major General Charalambos Katsimitros stopped the Italian advance. Along with the Italian failure in the Battle of Pindus, these Greek successes signified the complete failure of the Italian invasion, leading to the dismissal of the Italian commander in Albania, Sebastiano Visconti Prasca, on 9 November. In the next few weeks the Greek forces initiated a counteroffensive that forced the Italians to retreat deep into Albania.

== Background ==
After the Italian invasion of Albania in April 1939, the Greek General Staff was alerted to a potential Italian attack from Albanian territory. Faced with the strong likelihood of a concerted Italian-Bulgarian attack against both Epirus and Macedonia-Thrace, the main Greek contingency plan, codenamed "IB" (for "Italy-Bulgaria"), essentially prescribed a defensive stance in Epirus. Two versions of the plan existed: the first suggested forward defense on the border line, while the second dictated initial defense in an intermediate position prior to a gradual retreat to the Arachthos River–Metsovo–Aliakmon River–Mt. Vermio line, leaving most of Epirus in Italian hands. It was left to the judgment of General Katsimitros, commanding the 8th Infantry Division based in Ioannina, to choose which plan to follow. A significant factor favoring the Greeks was that they had obtained intelligence about the approximate date of the attack, and had just completed a limited mobilization in the areas facing the Italians.

== Battle ==
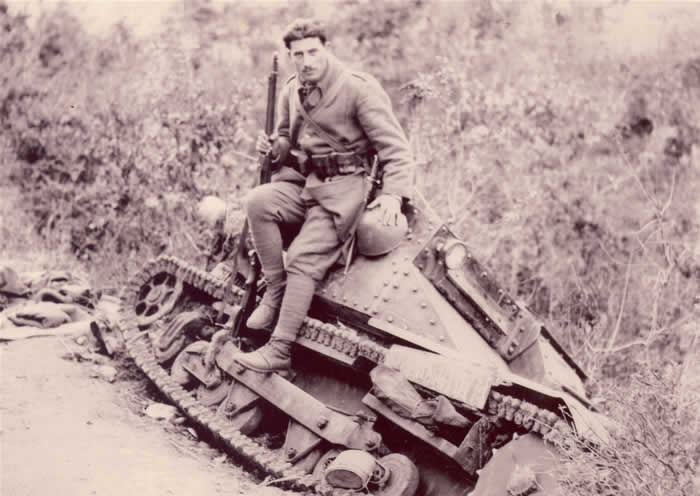
Greek soldier sitting on a captured Italian L3/35 tankette

The Greek High Command in the first days of the conflict was pessimistic about the ability of the Greek Army to repulse an Italian attack against a position which was difficult to defend. The defensive line near the Greek-Albanian border could be only thinly manned before the general mobilization and concentration could be completed and thus was expected to only delay the advance of enemy forces.

General Katsimitros, commanding the Greek 8th Infantry Division covering that part of the border, realized the defensive value of the mountainous and marshy terrain, which would partially negate the Italian superiority in men and tanks. Contrary to the directives from the High Command under Lieutenant General Alexander Papagos, he concentrated the main forces of his division there, with the intention of giving all-out battle. Papagos reluctantly approved Katsimitros's plan, after sending Colonel Drakos as Katsimitros's new chief of staff, who after careful study of the area, also agreed with the plan.

The Italian forces attacked on the morning of 28 October. The Italian Ciamuria Corps, composed of the 51st Infantry Division "Siena", the 23rd Infantry Division "Ferrara" and the 131st Armoured Division "Centauro", pushed toward Kalpaki (Elaia), supported on its right by a small brigade-sized Littoral Group of ca. 5,000 men.

Following their defensive plans, the Greek screening units delayed the Italians while falling back to the main defensive line of Elaia-Kalamas, about 25 km (16 mi) south of the Greek-Albanian border, 34 km (21 mi) northeast of Ioannina. On 2 November, the Greek forces were positioned according to the defensive plan along the line Kalamas–Elaia–Grabala–Kleftis Hill. On this day, after repeated air and artillery strikes, the Italian infantry of the Ferrara Division attacked unsuccessfully in order to advance the bulk of their forces closer to the Elaia sector.

The Italians faced difficulties because of the harshness of the terrain. The next day, their light L3/35 tankettes and medium M13/40 tanks were unable to cope with the hilly terrain and the muddy ground. The Greek defensive line could not be breached. On its right, the Littoral Group managed a slow advance along the coast and was able to secure a bridgehead over the Kalamas River on 5 November. The winter weather, poor leadership, and minefields caused the Italians many casualties. On 8 November, the fruitless Italian offensive was suspended. Because of the complete failure of the Italian operations, General Visconti Prasca was relieved of his command after only two weeks and replaced with General Ubaldo Soddu.

== Aftermath ==
After the successful Greek defense in Elea-Kalamas and in the mountains of Pindus, the Greek forces were able to push back the Italians, advancing into southern Albania. The Greeks would penetrate 30–80 kilometres (19–50 mi) into Albanian territory before the German intervention in April 1941.
