= Gorge of Këlcyrë =

Gorge in Albania

Coordinates: 40°17′51″N 20°9′54″E

The Këlcyrë Gorge (Albanian: Gryka e Këlcyrës) is a gorge in southern Albania created by the river Vjosë, west of the town of Këlcyrë.

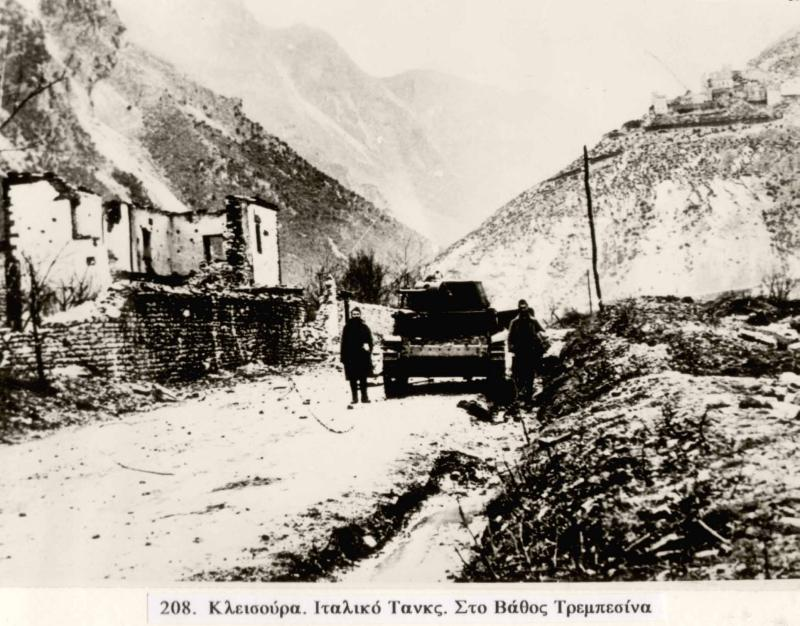
After the capture of Kleisoura Pass, 10 January 1941

The gorge became famous during the Capture of Klisura Pass battle during the Greco-Italian War in World War II. A Greek military cemetery for the fallen Greek soldiers is located within the pass.

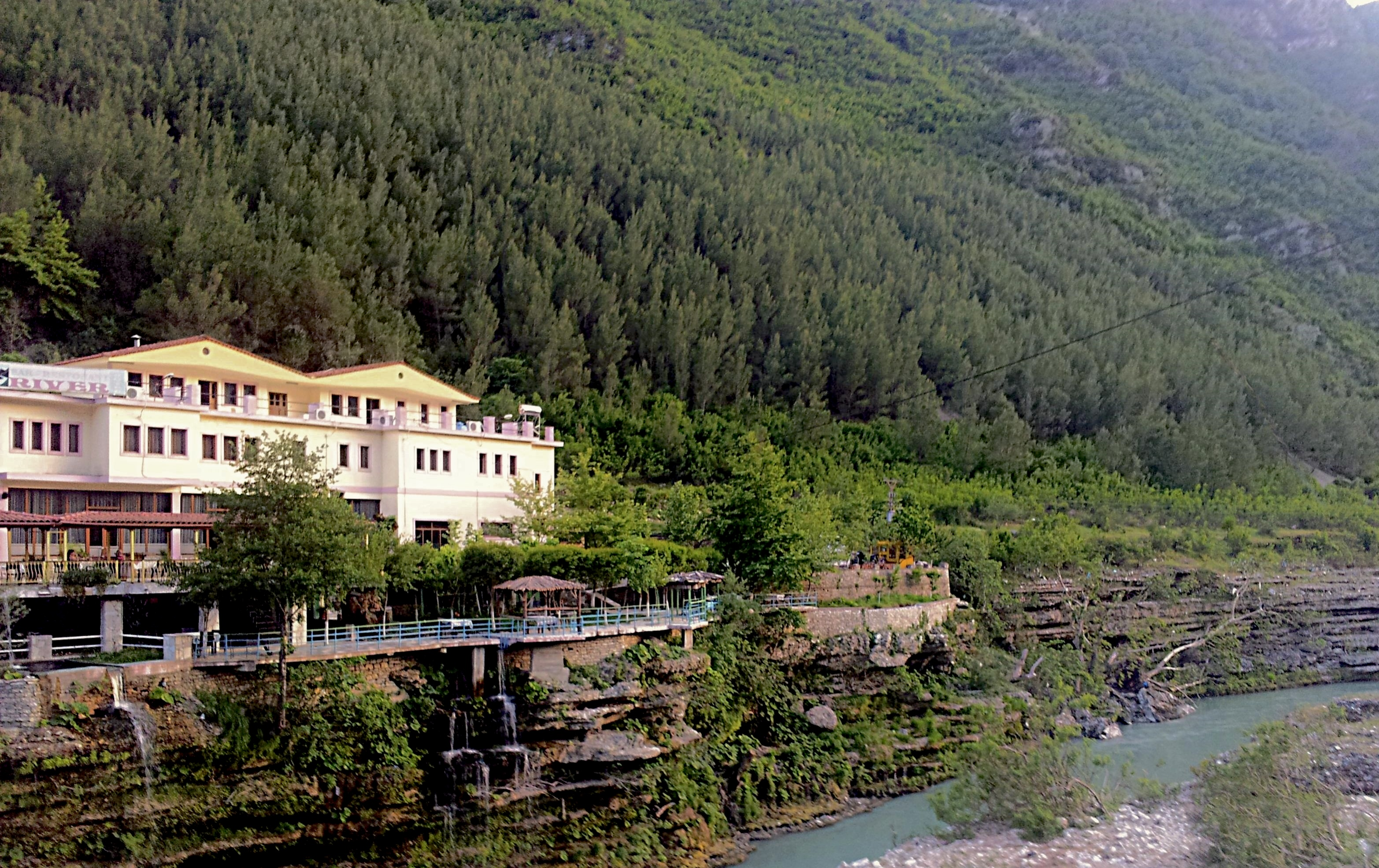
Këlcyrë Gorge today

== See also ==
- Këlcyrë Castle
- Tourism in Albania
- History of Albania
