= Flag of Greece =

Hellenic Republic
- Other names: Η Γαλανόλευκη, Η Κυανόλευκη
- Use: National flag and ensign
- Proportion: 2:3
- Adopted: 22 December 1978; 47 years ago (Naval ensign: 1822–1832 & 1970–present, National flag: 1969–1970 & 1978–present)
- Design: Nine horizontal stripes, in turn blue and white; a white Greek cross throughout a blue canton

The national flag of Greece, popularly referred to as the Blue-and-White (Γαλανόλευκη, Galanólefki) or the Cyan-and-White (Κυανόλευκη, Kyanólefki), is officially recognised by Greece as one of its national symbols and has 9 horizontal stripes of alternating blue and white. There is a blue canton in the upper hoist-side corner bearing a white cross; the cross symbolises Christianity. The blazon of the flag is azure, four bars argent; on a canton of the field a Greek cross throughout of the second. The shade of blue used in the flag has varied throughout its history, from light blue to dark blue, the latter being increasingly used since the late 1960s. It was officially adopted by the First National Assembly at Epidaurus on 13 January 1822.

While the nine stripes do not have any official meaning, the most popular interpretation says that they represent the syllables of the phrase Ελευθερία ή Θάνατος (Freedom or Death): the five blue stripes for the syllables in Ελευθερία, the four white for those of ή Θάνατος. White and blue might symbolize the colours of the Greek sky and sea.

== Historical background ==
Greek Orthodox Christian Merchant Flag (1453–1793)

It has been suggested by historians that the current flag derived from an older design, the virtually identical flag of the powerful Cretan Kallergis family. This flag was based on their coat of arms, whose pattern is supposed to be derived from the standards of their claimed ancestor, Byzantine Emperor Nicephorus II Phocas (963–969 AD). This pattern (according to not easily verifiable descriptions) included nine stripes of alternating blue and white, as well as a cross, assumed to be placed on the upper left. Although the use of alternating blue and white – or silver – stripes on (several centuries-old) Kallergis' coats of arms is well documented, no depiction of the above described pattern (with the nine stripes and the cross) survives.

A number of sources describe, since at least 1810 and through the revolution, a flag consisting of eight horizontal alternating blue and white stripes used by Greeks as a sea flag, suggesting a connection with the original naval flag, and subsequent national flag.

=== Antiquity and the Byzantine Empire ===
This design, from the 14th century during the Palaiologan dynasty, is the only attested flag of the Byzantine Empire.

The Byzantines, like the Romans before them, used a variety of flags and banners, primarily to denote different military units. These were generally square or rectangular, with a number of streamers attached. Most prominent among the early Byzantine flags was the labarum. In the surviving pictorial sources of the middle and later Empire, primarily the illustrated Skylitzes Chronicle, the predominating colours are red and blue in horizontal stripes, with a cross often placed in the centre of the flag. Other common symbols, prominently featuring on seals, were depictions of Christ, the Virgin Mary and saints, but these represent personal rather than family or state symbols. Western European-style heraldry was largely unknown until the last centuries of the Empire.

There is no mention of any "state" flag until the mid-14th century, when a Spanish atlas, the Conosçimiento de todos los reynos depicts the flag of "the Empire of Constantinople" combining the red-on-white Cross of St George with the "tetragrammatic cross" of the ruling house of the Palaiologoi, featuring the four betas or pyrekvola ("fire-steels") on the flag quarters representing the imperial motto Βασιλεύς Βασιλέων Βασιλεύων Βασιλευόντων ("King of Kings Reigning over those who Rule"). The tetragrammatic cross flag, as it appears in quarters II and III in this design, is well documented. In the same Spanish atlas this "plain" tetragrammatic cross flag is presented as (among other places in the Empire) "the Flag of Salonika" and "the real Greece and Empire of the Greeks (la vera Grecia e el imperio de los griegos)". The (quartered) arrangement that includes the Cross of St. George is documented only in the Spanish atlas, and most probably combines the arms of Genoa (which had occupied Galata) with those of the Byzantine Empire, and was most probably flown only in Constantinople. Pseudo-Kodinos records the use of the "tetragrammatic cross" on the banner (phlamoulon) borne by imperial naval vessels, while the megas doux displayed an image of the emperor on horseback.

=== Ottoman period ===
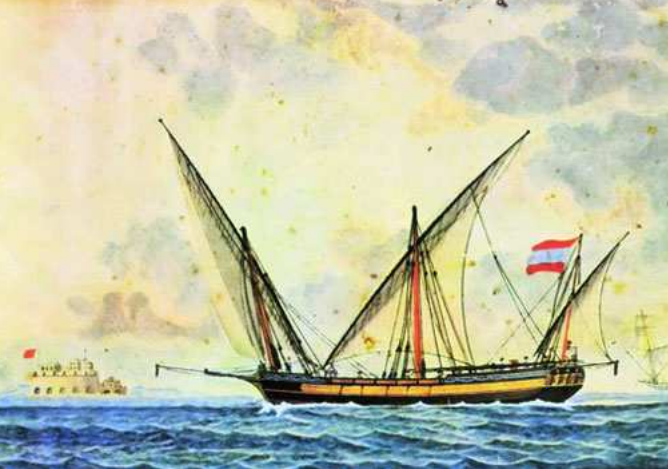
The merchant vessel Panagia tis Hydras, built 1793, flying the Graeco-Ottoman flag

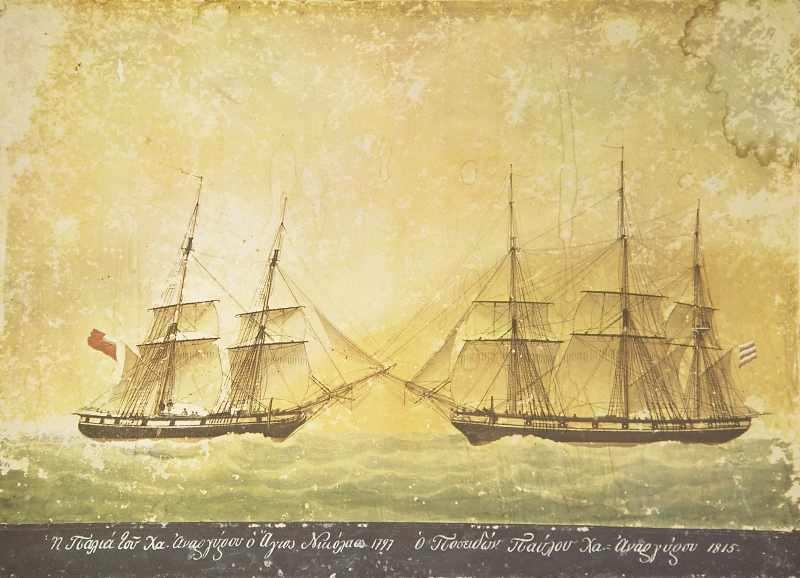
Agios Nikolaos (1797) and Poseidon (1815), belonging to the Anargyros brothers from Spetses, flying variants of the Russian flag

During the Ottoman rule several unofficial flags were used by Greeks, usually employing the Byzantine double-headed eagle (see below), the cross, depictions of saints and various mottoes.

A military leader, Yiannis Stathas, used a flag with white cross on blue on his ship since 1800. The first flag featuring the design eventually adopted was created and hoisted in the Evangelistria monastery in Skiathos in 1807. Several prominent military leaders (including Theodoros Kolokotronis and Andreas Miaoulis) had gathered there for consultation concerning an uprising, and they were sworn to this flag by the local bishop.

Flag used by the Greek sipahis of the Ottoman army between 1431 and 1619

Civil ensign for merchant ships owned by Ottoman subjects belonging to the Greek Orthodox (Rum) millet

Civil flag and ensign of the Principality of Samos (1835–1912)

Flag of the Septinsular Republic (1800–1807), the first autonomous modern Greek state

National flag and ensign of the Cretan State

Flag of the Free State of Icaria

=== War of Independence ===
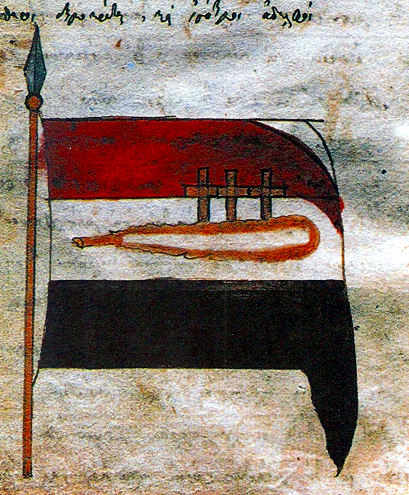
Proposed flag of Greece as drawn by Rigas Feraios in his manuscripts

Bishop Germanos of Patras blessing the flag of the Greek revolutionaries at the Monastery of Agia Lavra, part of a popular legend regarding the start of the revolution of 1821, although it never actually happened

Flag used by Orlov revolutionaries from 1770 to the early stages of the War of Independence

=== Revolutionary flags ===
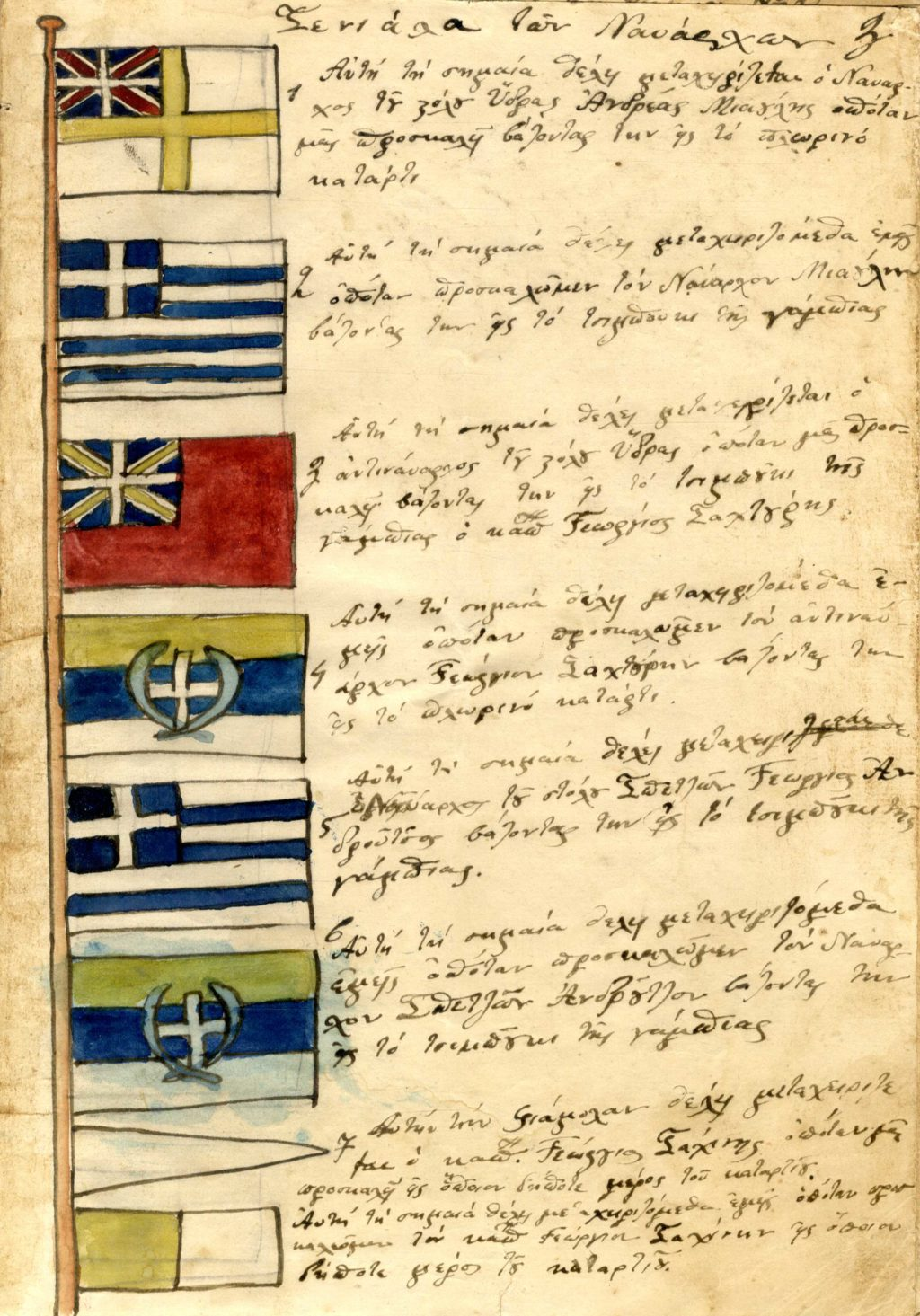
Flags used by various admirals of the Revolutionary Navy, from an 1823 manuscript

The flag of Greece, as proposed by Rigas Feraios in 1797

Flag of the Sacred Band with phoenix and motto "from my ashes I'm reborn"

Flag of Alexander Ypsilantis

Flag of the Areopagus of Eastern Continental Greece

The flag of Andreas Londos

The flag of Krokodeilos Kladas

Flag of the Filiki Eteria with initials of the motto "Freedom or Death"

Flag of the Greeks of Thrace

Flag of the Maniots

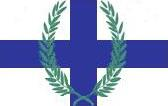
Used in Thessaly, created by Anthimos Gazis

Flag of Hydra island

Flag of Spetses island

Flag of Kastellorizo island

Flag of Chalkidiki

Flag of Athanasios Diakos

Flag of the Military-Political System of Samos

=== Adoption ===
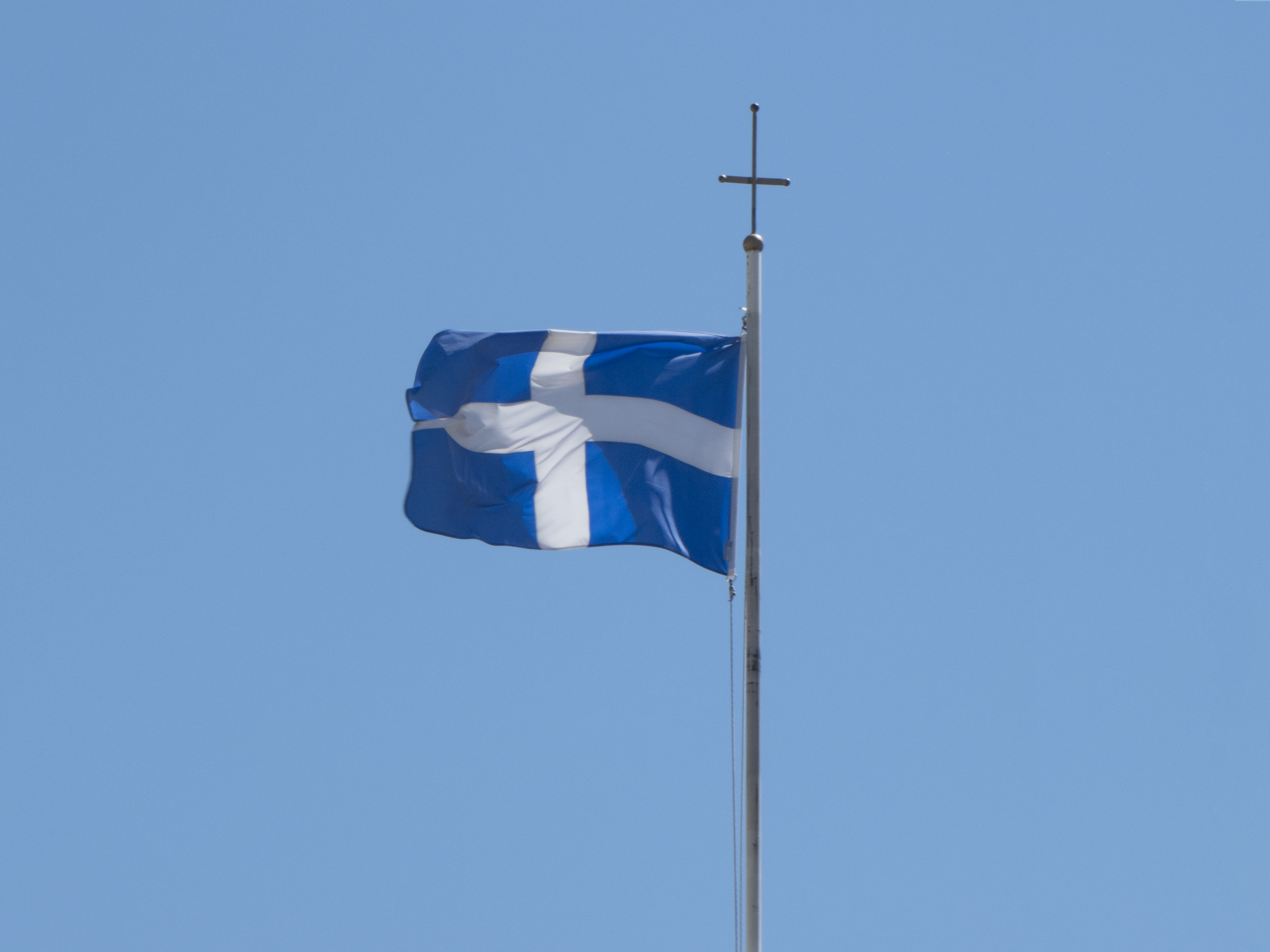
The old land flag, still flying over the Old Parliament House in Athens

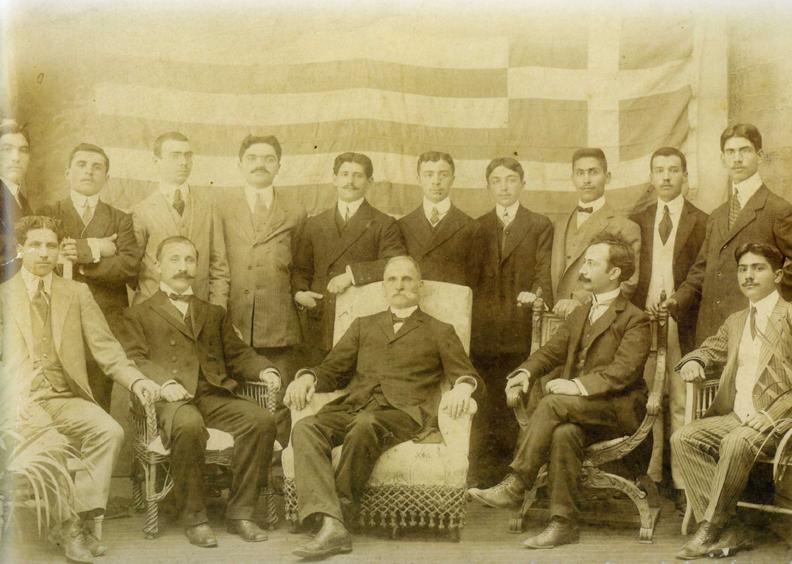
Greek Teachers and Graduates of the Evangelical School of Smyrna with the Greek flag (1878)

European monarchies, aligned in the so-called "Concert of Europe", were suspicious towards national or social revolutionary movements such as the Etaireia. The First Greek National Assembly, convening in January 1822, thus took steps to disassociate itself from the Etaireia's legacy and portray nascent Greece as a "conventional", ordered nation-state. As such, not only were the regional councils abolished in favour of a central administration, but it was decided to abolish all revolutionary flags and adopt a universal national flag. The reasons why the particular arrangement (white cross on blue) was selected, instead of the more popular blue cross on a white field, remain unknown.

On 15 March 1822, the Provisional Government, by Decree Nr. 540, laid down the exact pattern: white cross on blue (plain) for the land flag; nine alternate-coloured stripes with the white cross on a blue field in the canton for the naval ensign; and blue with a blue cross on a white field in the canton for the civil ensign (merchant flag). On 30 June 1828, by decree of the Governor Ioannis Kapodistrias, the civil ensign was discontinued, and the cross-and-stripes naval ensign became the national ensign, worn by both naval and merchant ships.

On 7 February 1828 the Greek flag was internationally recognised for the first time by receiving an official salutation from British, French, and Russian forces in Nafplio, then the capital of Greece.

=== National flags ===
National flag (1822–1863, 1924–1935, 1941–1944 & 1975–1978) as adopted by the First National Assembly at Epidaurus

National flag (1863–1924, 1935–1941 & 1944–1969)

National flag (1970–1975)
Proportions: 7:12

National flag (1970–1975)
Proportions: 2:3

Naval ensign (1822–1832 & 1970–present), National flag (1969–1970 & 1978–present)
Proportions: 2:3

Naval ensign (1822–1832 & 1970–present), National flag (1969–1970 & 1978–present)
Proportions: 7:12

=== Historical evolution ===
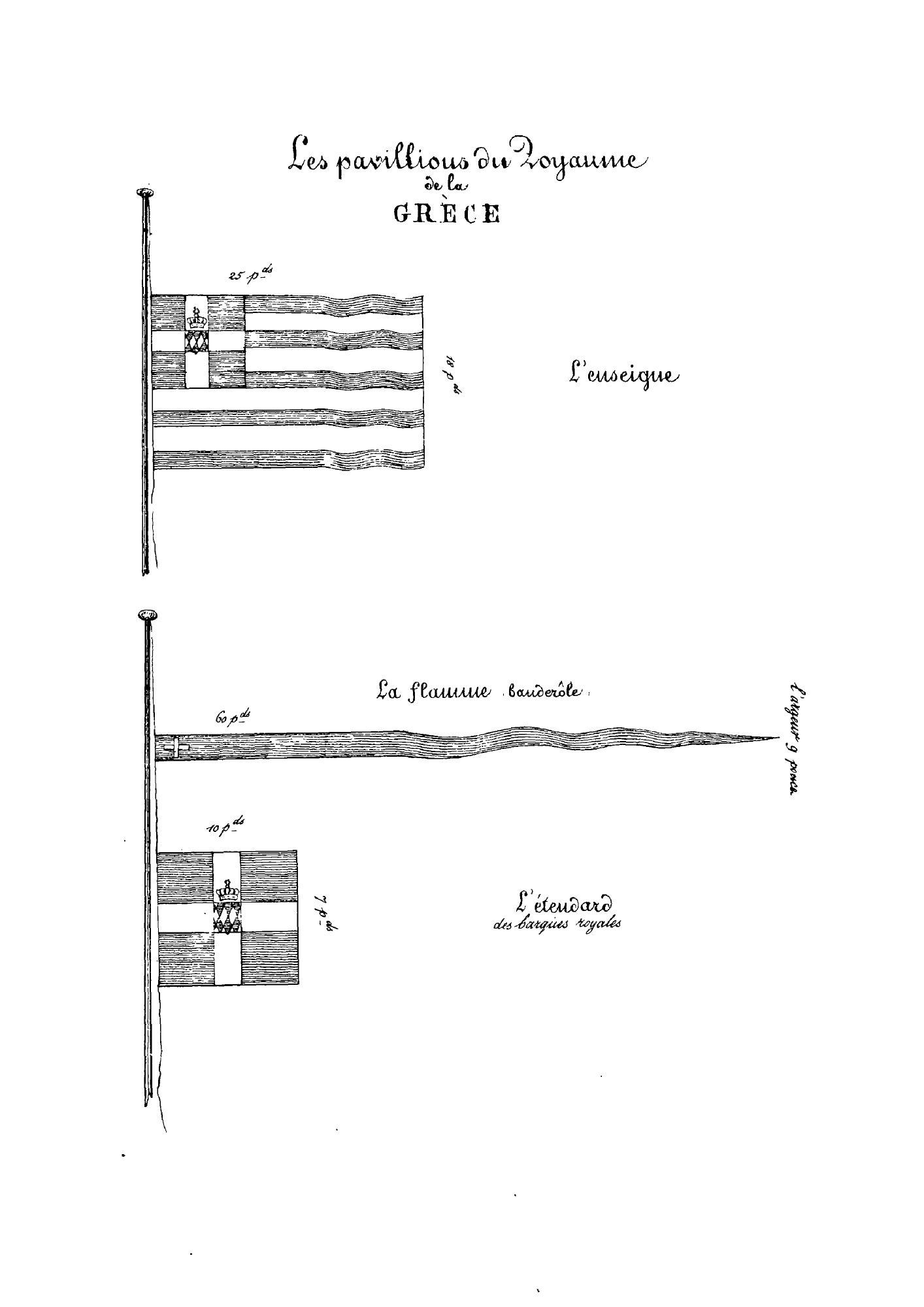
The first official specifications for the war flag or naval ensign (published 3 June 1833)

After the establishment of the Kingdom of Greece in 1832, the new king, Otto, added the royal coat of arms (a shield in his ancestral Bavarian pattern topped by a crown) in the centre of the cross for military flags (both land and sea versions). The decree dated 4 (16) April 1833 provided for various maritime flags such as the war flag or naval ensign (set at 18:25), pennant, royal standard (set at 7:10) and civil ensign (i.e. the naval ensign without coat of arms).

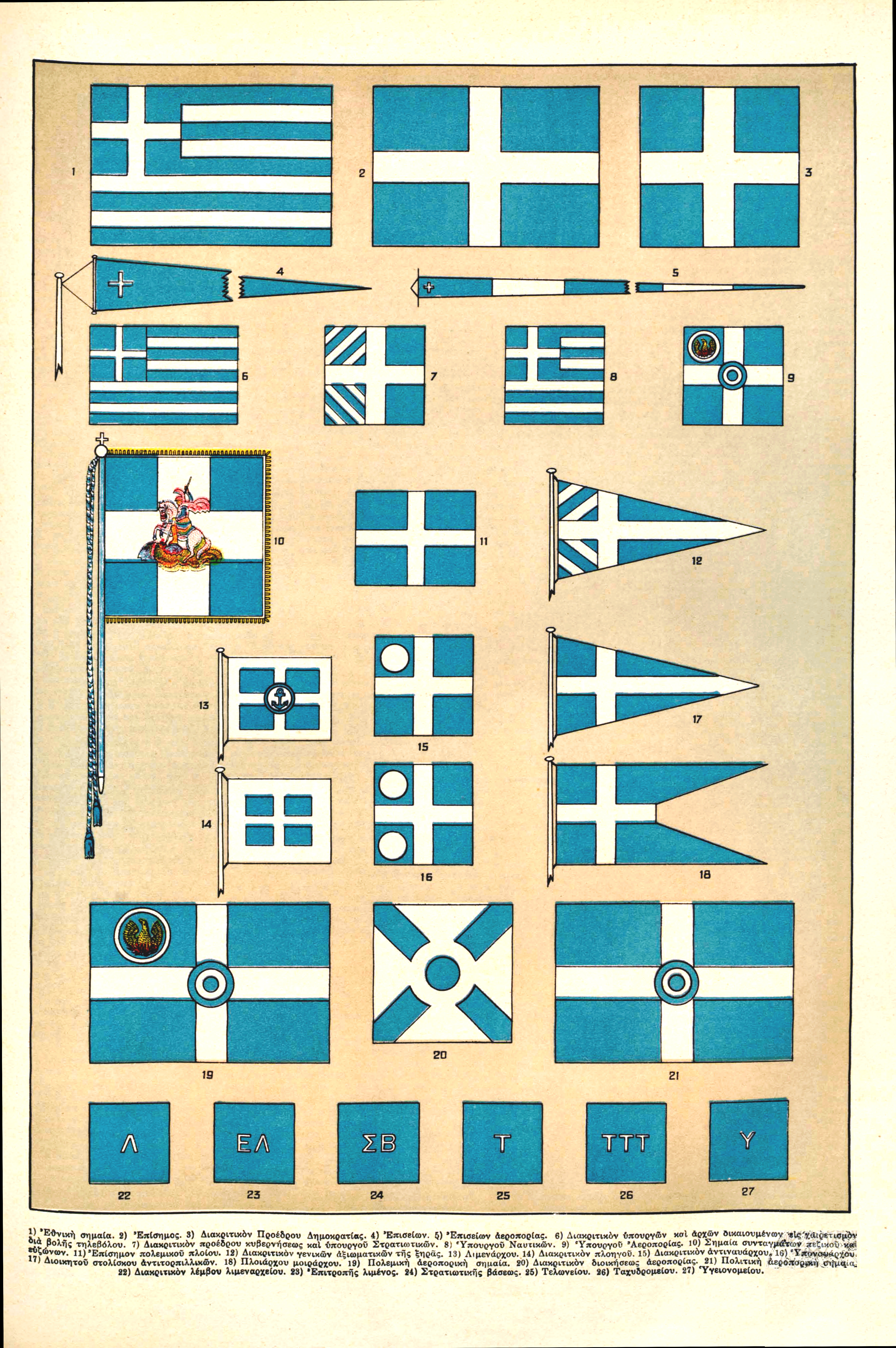
Administrative flags of Greece (1934)

In 1863, the 17-year old Danish prince William was selected as Greece's new king, taking on the name George I. A royal decree dated 28 December 1863 introduced crowns into the various flags in place of the coat of arms. Similar arrangements were made for the royal flags, which featured the coat of arms of the House of Schleswig-Holstein-Sonderburg-Glücksburg on a square version of the national flag. A square version of the land flag with St. George in the centre was adopted on 9 April 1864 as the Army's colours. The exact shape and usage of the flags was determined by Royal Decree on 26 September 1867. By a new Royal Decree, on 31 May 1914, the various flags of Greece and its military were further regulated. By this decree, the flag with the crown was adopted for use as a state flag by ministries, embassies and civil services, while the sea flag (without the crown) was allowed for use by private citizens.

On 25 March 1924, with the establishment of the Second Hellenic Republic, the crowns were removed from all flags. On 20 February 1930, the national flag's proportions were established at a 2:3 ratio, with the arms of the cross being "one fifth of the flag's width". The land version of the national flag was to be used by ministries, embassies, and in general by all civil and military services, while the sea flag was to be used by naval and merchant vessels, consulates and private citizens. On 10 October 1935, Georgios Kondylis declared that the monarchy had been restored. By decree of 7 November 1935, the 31 May 1914 decree was restored.

The Greek flag was a forbidden symbol, especially during the triple Axis occupation of Greece, German, Italian and Bulgarian, in the period 1941–1944. It was a symbol of National Resistance and struggle against the occupying forces. In September 1944 in Prosotsani, and while the wider Eastern Macedonia was under the occupation of Bulgarians, the public school teacher Konstantinos Kazanas together with Asterios Asteriadis lowered the Bulgarian flag and raised the Greek one, in the central square of the town, despite the terrorism and threats of the occupiers. The event is unique for the entire conquered Europe as it involved the lowering of the conqueror's flag in broad daylight and the raising of the national flag.

==== Military dictatorship (1967–1974) ====
The legal provisions went unaltered for a relatively long period of time. In 1967, a new Compulsory Law (198) regulated the declaration of regional flag days, but did not alter the flag. However, on 18 August 1969, the sea flag was established as the sole national flag and on 18 August 1970, the flag ratio was changed to 7:12 from 2:3. Flags flying in ministries, embassies and public buildings had the crown in the centre of the cross until the official abolition of the monarchy on 1 June 1973 and the use of the crown was officially discontinued on July 16.

After the restoration of democracy, Law 48/1975 and Presidential Decree 515/1975, which entered into effect on 7 June 1975, reversed the situation and designated the former "land flag" as the sole flag of Greece, to be used even at sea. The situation was once again reversed in 1978, when the sea flag once again became the sole flag of Greece and all previous provisions were abolished.

=== Theories regarding the blue and white colours ===
Several Greek researchers have attempted to establish a continuity of usage and significance of the blue and white colours, throughout Greek history.

Usages cited include the pattern of blue and white formations included on the shield of Achilles, the apparent connection of blue with goddess Athena, some of Alexander the Great's army banners, possible blue and white flags used during Byzantine times, supposed coats of arms of imperial dynasties and noble families, uniforms, emperors' clothes, patriarchs' thrones etc., documented 15th century versions of the Byzantine Imperial Emblems and, of course, cases of usage during the Ottoman rule and the Greek revolution.

A flag consisting of eight horizontal alternating blue and white stripes used by Greeks as a sea flag, is described by a number of sources, since at least 1810 and through the revolution, suggesting a strong connection with the original naval flag.

On the other hand, the Great Greek Encyclopedia notes in its 1934 entry on the Greek flag that "very many things have been said for the causes which lead to this specification for the Greek flag, but without historical merit".

== Current flag of Greece ==
Construction sheet of the national flag

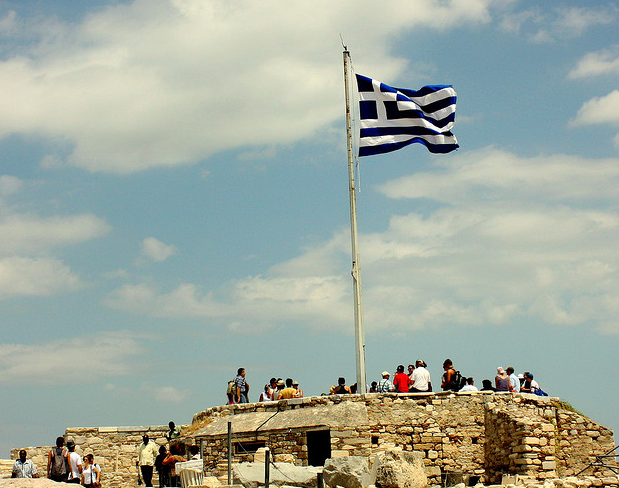
The Flag of Greece flying on the Acropolis of Athens

Correct vertical display

Incorrect vertical display

In 1978, the sea flag was adopted as the sole national flag, with a 2:3 ratio.

=== Protocol ===
The flag as used in parades

The use of the Greek flag is regulated by Law 851. More specifically, the law states that:

- When displayed at the Presidential Palace, the Hellenic Parliament, the ministries, embassies and consulates of Greece, schools, military camps, and public and private ships as well as the navy, the flag must:

1. Fly from 8am until sunset,
2. Be displayed on a white mast topped with a white cross on top of a white sphere,
3. Not be torn or damaged in any way. If the flag is damaged, it should be burned in a respectful manner.

- The flag can be displayed by civilians on days specified by the ministry of internal affairs, as well as in sporting events and other occasions of the sort.
- When displayed vertically, the canton must be on the left side of the flag from the point of view of the spectator.
- The flag should never be:

1. Defaced by means of writing or superimposing any kind of image or symbol upon it,
2. Used to cover a statue. In that case, cloth in the national colours must be used,
3. Hung from windows or balconies without the use of a mast,
4. Used for commercial purposes,
5. Used as a logo for any corporation or organization, even at different proportions.

- When placed on top of a coffin, the canton must always be on the right of the person's head.

=== Colours ===
The Government of Greece has never specified exactly which shade of blue should be used for the flag, and as such flags with many varying shades exist. In the most recent legislation regarding the national flag, the colours mentioned are:

The National Flag of Greece is cyan and white, it is made up of nine (9) stripes equal in width, of which five (5) are cyan and four (4) are white so that the upper and lower stripes are cyan and the others in between are white.

— Law 851/1978, Regarding the National Flag, Article 1, Clause 1

Because of the use of the word "cyan" (Greek: κυανός, kyanós), which can also mean "blue" in Greek, the exact shade of blue remains ambiguous. Although it implies the use of a light shade of blue, such as on the flag of the United Nations, the colours of the Greek flag tend to be a relatively dark blue, especially since the Regime of the Colonels (though during the reign of Otto I a very light shade of cyan was commonly used). Consequently, the shade of blue is largely left to the flagmakers to decide.

In a 2010 document, the specific shade of blue used in the coat of arms of Greece was given as Pantone 280 U/C/M or CMYK 100/70/0/20. Though web colors specifications are not given, HEX #014488 is used consistently throughout the document.

- Pantone 280 U/C/M (CMYK 100/70/0/20)
- HEX #014488, used in digital displays
- HEX #FFFFFF, (CMYK 0/0/0/0)

=== Flag days ===
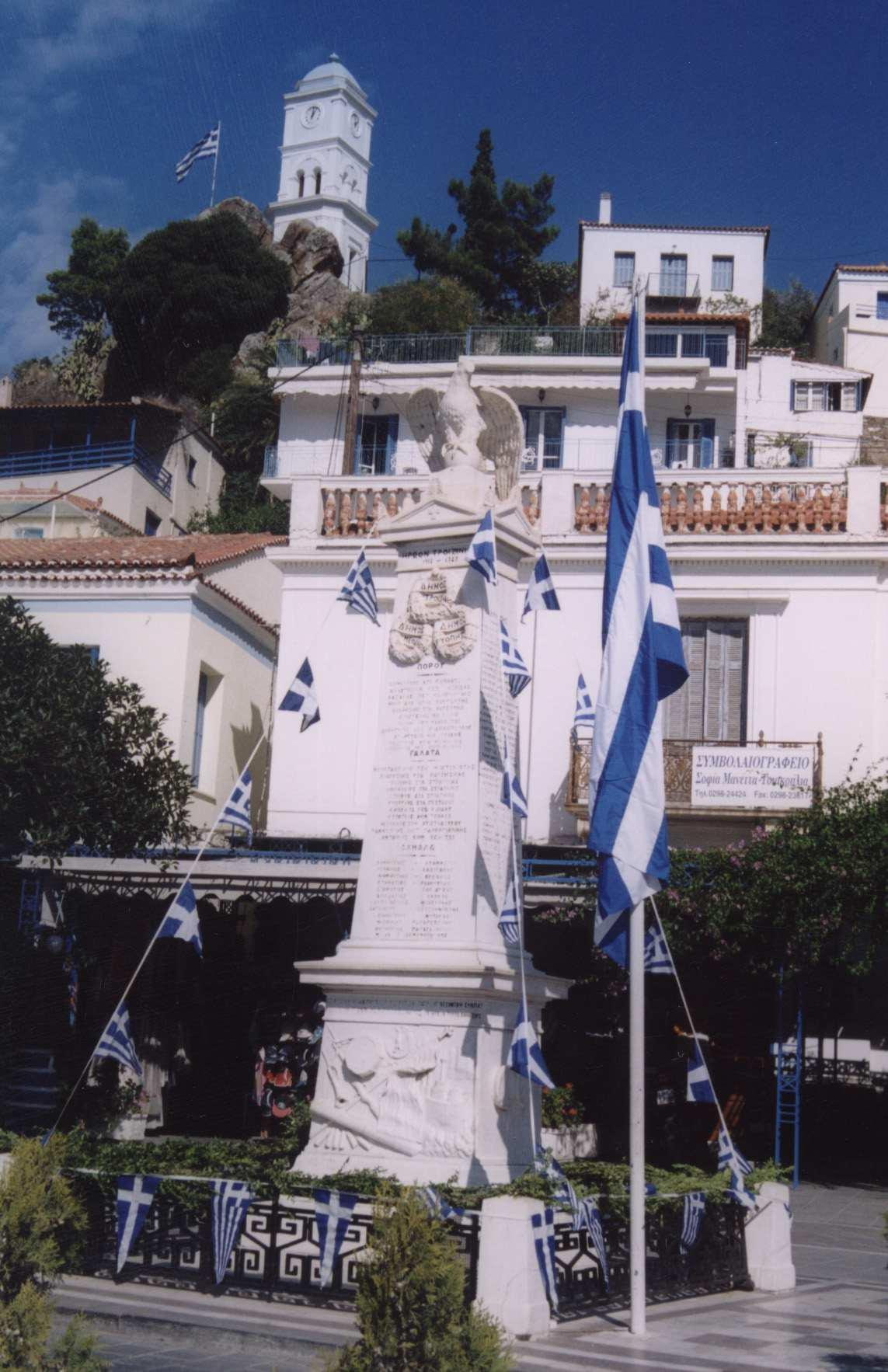
Ohi Day decorations in Poros

Law 851/1978 sets the general outline for when the specific days on which the flag should be raised. For national holidays, this applies country-wide, but on local ones it only applies to those areas where the said holiday is being celebrated. Additionally, the flag may also be flown on days of national mourning, half-mast. The Minister of the Interior has the authority to proclaim flag days if they are not already proclaimed, and proclaiming regional flag days is vested with the elected head of each regional unit (formerly prefectures).

National flag days in Greece
Date	Name	Reason
25 March	25th of March	Anniversary of the traditional start date for the Greek War of Independence.
28 October	Ochi Day (No Day)	Anniversary of the refusal to accept the Italian ultimatum in 1940.
17 November	Polytechnic Day	Anniversary of the Athens Polytechnic uprising against the military junta (school holiday).

Although 17 November is not an official national holiday, Presidential Decree 201/1998 states that respects are to be paid to the flag on that particular day.

=== Usage in the Republic of Cyprus ===
According to the Constitution of Cyprus, the community authorities and their institutions have the right to hoist the Greek flag (as well as the Turkish flag) alongside the flag of Cyprus during the holidays. Any citizen may, without any restriction, fly the Greek or Turkish flag, or both, next to the flag of Cyprus.

== Military flags ==
=== Army and Air Force War flag ===
The war flag (equivalent to regimental colours) of the Army and the Air Force is of square shape, with a white cross on blue background. On the centre of the cross the image of Saint George is shown on Army war flags and the image of archangel Michael is shown on Air Force war flags.

In the Army war flags are normally carried by infantry, tank and special forces regiments and battalions, by the Evelpidon Military Academy, the Non-Commissioned Officers Academy and the Presidential Guard when in battle or in parade.

Army regimental war flag

Air Force and civil air ensign, 1973–1978

=== Naval and civil ensigns ===
The current naval and civil ensigns are identical to the national flag.

The simple white cross on blue field pattern is also used as the Navy's jack and as the base pattern for naval rank flags. These flags are described in Chapter 21 (articles 2101–30) of the Naval Regulations. A jack is also flown by larger vessels of the Hellenic Coast Guard.

Units of Naval or Coast Guard personnel in parade fly the war ensign in place of the war flag.

Civil ensign (1822–1828)

Naval ensign (1833–1858)
Proportions: 18:25

Naval ensign (1858–1862)
Proportions: 2:3

Naval ensign (1863–1924 & 1935–1970)

Coast Guard ensign (1973–1980)

Naval jack of Greece

Naval rank flag of the prime minister of Greece

Naval rank flag for a full admiral

=== Other uniformed services ===
In the past a war flag was assigned to the former semi-military Hellenic Gendarmerie, which was later merged with Cities Police to form the current Hellenic Police. The flag was similar to the Army war flag but showing Saint Irene in place of Saint George.

Since the Fire Service and the Hellenic Police are considered civilian agencies, they are not assigned war flags. They use the National Flag instead. Identical rules were applied to the former Cities Police. However, recently the Police Academy has been assigned a war flag, and they paraded for the first time with this flag on Independence Day, 25 March 2011. The flag is similar to the Army war flag, with the image of St George replaced with that of Artemius of Antioch.

== Flag of the head of state ==
The president's flag is currently prescribed by Presidential Decree 274/1979.

Flag with the monogram of King Otto of Greece (1833–1862)

The Naval Royal Standard of Greece (1833–1858)

The Naval Royal Standard of Greece (1858–1862)

The Royal Standard of Greece (1863–1913)

Flag of King George I of Greece (1863–1913)

Flag of King Constantine I of Greece in his capacity as a Field Marshal (1914–1917 and 1920–1922)

Flag of the president of Greece (1924–1935)

Flag of the king of Greece (1936–1967)

Flag of the president of Greece (1973–1974)

Flag of the president of Greece (1979–present)

== Use of double-headed eagle ==
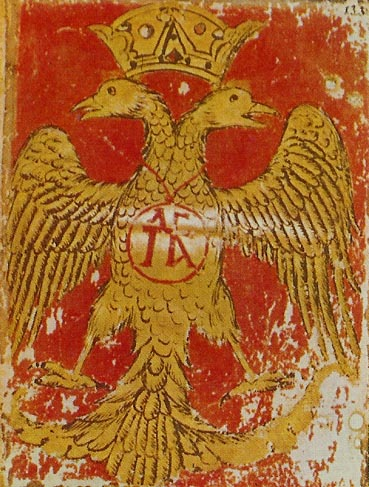
The double-headed eagle was the symbol of the Palaiologoi dynasty.

One of the most recognisable and beloved Greek symbols, the double-headed eagle, is not a part of the modern Greek flag or coat of arms (although it is officially used by the Greek Army, the Church of Greece, the Cypriot National Guard and the Church of Cyprus, and was incorporated in the Greek coat of arms in 1926).

Flag of the Greek Orthodox Church

Flag of the Autonomous Republic of Northern Epirus

Flag of the Hellenic Army General Staff

== See also ==
- List of Greek flags
- Coat of arms of Greece
- Greece
- History of Greece
- Hymn to Liberty
- Byzantine flags and insignia
