= Coat of arms of Greece =

Versions
- Military version, used by the Greek military, security services and on the presidential standard
- Armiger: Hellenic Republic (white wreath); Konstantinos Tasoulas, President of the Hellenic Republic (golden wreath)
- Adopted: 7 June 1975
- Shield: Azure, a Greek Cross throughout Argent
- Other elements: Two laurel branches

The coat of arms of Greece (Greek: Εθνόσημο, lit. 'national emblem', [eθˈnosimo]) comprises a white Greek cross on a blue escutcheon, surrounded by two laurel branches. It has been in use in its current form since 1975. Prior to the adoption of the current coat of arms, Greece used a number of different designs, some of which were not heraldic; the first heraldic design was introduced in 1832 and its main element, the blue shield with the white cross, has been the base for all other national coats of arms since then. The design is a heraldic representation of the Greek national flag adopted in 1822, which featured a white cross on a blue field.

The proper heraldic description of the coat of arms is: Azure, a cross Argent. The Law regulating the coat of arms does not specify a tincture for the laurel branches, implying proper (or vert, i.e. green). Official usage portrays the laurel branches as monochrome blue, while a version with the branches in gold is used by the military and on the presidential standard. Since standardisation in 2010, the Government of Greece has used a stylised version of the coat of arms as a government logo, again in monochrome.

In periods of monarchy, the shield was topped by a royal crown and surrounded by elaborate ornamentation expressive of royal authority, including male figures as supporters, the Order of the Redeemer, a mantle and pavilion, and the royal motto. The shield was also sometimes charged with the dynastic arms of House of Wittelsbach under Otto of Greece, and by those of the House of Glücksburg after his exile. Other designs adopted prior to 1832 made heavy use of ancient Greek imagery, such as Athena and her owl, as well as other popular revolutionary symbols such as the Phoenix rising from its ashes, symbolising the rebirth of Greece as an independent state.

== History ==
=== Non-heraldic designs ===
The political thinker and revolutionary Rigas Feraios was the first to propose a national emblem for Greece, including a hand-drawing rendition of it in his hand-written New Political Constitution of 1797. Rigas' proposal was composed of a club of Heracles, with the words Liberty – Equality – Fraternity superimposed on it, and three crosses topping it. In his Map of Greece of 1796–1797, Rigas explains that the club stands for the power of Greece, but its use was not limited to ethnic Greeks and could also be used by any of the other Balkan peoples he envisaged would make up his multi-ethnic Hellenic Republic. In his selection of this device, however, he was directly influenced by the Jacobin radicalism of the French Revolution, which utilised the device of the club of Heracles as a symbol of democratic power. The national colours he proposed were red, white, and black, symbolising self-determination, purity, and sacrifice respectively. The club, sewn onto a white cockade, would be the identifying mark by which "free democrats and equal brothers" would recognise each other. This design was never officially adopted.

The first official Greek national emblem was described in the Provisional Constitution adopted by the First National Assembly at Epidaurus on 1 January 1822 and was established by decree on 15 March of the same year. The national emblem was described as a simple cockade of white and blue. These colours were chosen as the national colours over more "revolutionary" choices such as black and red, popular in Greece ever since Rigas had proposed them, so as to disassociate the government and the revolution from any perceived links to radical movements in the eyes of the conservative European royal courts.

Since its establishment, the emblem has undergone many changes in shape and in design, mainly due to changes of regime. Apart from the cockade, the Provisional Administration of Greece used a seal depicting the goddess Athena and her symbol, the Owl of Athena, encircled by the words "Provisional Administration of Greece". During the governorate of Ioannis Kapodistrias (1827–1831), a new seal based on the phoenix, the symbol of rebirth, was created. The words "Hellenic State", accompanied with the date "1821" (the year the Greek War of Independence began) in Greek numerals, surrounded it.

This seal gave Greece's first currency, the Phoenix, its name. The phoenix was also used as a symbol by later Greek non-monarchical governments, including the Second Hellenic Republic (1924–1935) and the junta-proclaimed republic of 1973–1974.

1797
Proposal of Rigas Feraios

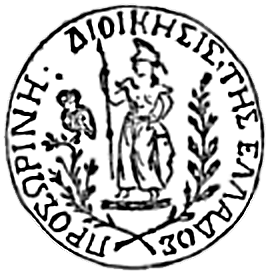
1822–1827
First Republic
(Seal)

1827–1833
First Republic
(Seal)

1829
First Republic
(Government gazette header)

1832
First Republic
(Government gazette header)

=== Heraldic designs ===
Banner of the Palaiologoi

Middle arms of King Otto

Cockade established as a national emblem in 1833

The current coat of arms of Greece derives from the Greek national flag, which was adopted in March 1822. Theories published retrospectively in Greece try to justify this use by making a connection to Byzantine flags and insignia. The 1934 edition of the Great Greek Encyclopedia explains that "the current national emblem of Greece shares this with the last emblem of Medieval [Greece], that it is made up of a cross dividing the emblem into four quarters. The difference is that the emblem of the Imperial house of the Palaiologoi also had a capital B in each of the quarters". This design is well attested in Byzantine and Western sources during the 14th and 15th centuries, but as the Byzantines entirely lacked the Western tradition of "national" or family heraldic designs as coats of arms, this design was only used in flags.

==== Wittelsbach dynasty ====
The introduction of the blue shield with the white cross as the heraldic device to represent Greece occurred on 26 February [O.S. 14 February] 1833, when the regency council which was governing Greece on behalf of its first king, Otto, announced the official design for the coat of arms. Approved by Prime Minister Josef Ludwig von Armansperg, it detailed the entire heraldic achievement and described, in Greek and German, its constituent parts. The lesser arms are described as an "equidistant azure escutcheon, pointed towards the middle of its lower side, and containing the Greek cross, argent, bearing at its centre an inescutcheon with the lozenges of the Royal House of Bavaria." The shade of blue is specified as light blue (German: hellblau). The escutcheon itself was supported by two crowned lions rampant and surmounted by the royal crown. The entire composition was contained within a mantle and pavilion, purple on the outside and ermine on the inside, topped again with the royal crown. This emblem was discarded following the 23 October 1862 Revolution and Otto's subsequent exile. Despite this fact, however, the blue shield with the white cross remained the basis upon which all subsequent coats of arms were based, including the current arms of the Third Hellenic Republic. The white and blue cockade of the revolutionary period was reinstated in March 1833, this time blue on the outside and white on the inside, so that the blue centre was equal to two thirds of the diameter of the cockade. This design, described both as a 'national emblem' (ἐθνόσημον) and a 'cockade' (κοκάρδα) in Greek and as the 'national cockade' (National-Kokarde) in German, was to be worn on caps by uniformed military and civilian personnel as well as on the hats of private citizens that wished to display their national pride.

==== Glücksburg dynasty and Second Republic ====
Following Otto's deposition in 1862, the 17-year old Prince William of Denmark was chosen in 1863 as Greece's new king. The coat of arms was suitably altered by the Royal Decree of 9 November 1863. The text of the decree was almost identical to that of 1833, with minor additions and removals to accommodate Greece's new royal house, the House of Glücksburg. The escutcheon remained the same, but the dynastic arms of the Glücksburg family, including the three lions of the arms of Denmark proper, the two lions of Schleswig, the nettle leaf of Holstein, the horse head of Lauenburg, the two red bars of the House of Oldenburg and the yellow cross of Delmenhorst, were added in an inescutcheon at the centre of the cross when the coat of arms was used to represent members of the Greek royal family. The shield remained surmounted by the royal crown but the supporters were changed to figures of Heracles, similar to the 'wild men' of the coat of arms of Denmark. This gave rise to the use of the term "Ἡρακλεῖς τοῦ Στέμματος" ("Heracleses of the Crown") as a derogatory term for Greek monarchists. The Order of the Redeemer was also added, while the new royal motto, "Ἰσχύς μου ἡ ἀγάπη τοῦ λαοῦ" ("The people's love is my strength"), was also introduced in gold lettering on an azure band.

When Greece became a republic in 1924, all ornamentation was discarded and a simple escutcheon adopted as the coat of arms. During the short-lived dictatorship of Theodoros Pangalos in 1925–26, four symbols were added to the national emblem in the four quarters created by the cross: the head of Athena, symbolising the ancient Greek period; a helmet and spear, symbolising the Macedonian period; a double-headed eagle, symbolising the Byzantine period; and a phoenix rising from its ashes, symbolising the modern Greek period. A wreath of oak leaves on the right, and of laurel leaves on the left, surrounded the emblem, symbolising power and glory, respectively. This particular emblem was criticised for being inappropriate and violating heraldic rules, before being again replaced by the simple shield following the fall of Pangalos and his dictatorship. Until the abolition of the republic in 1935, a phoenix was often added in the centre of the cross as a symbol of Greek republicanism.

Coat of arms of the Kingdom of Greece
- Armiger: Pavlos, Head of the Royal House of Greece
- Adopted: 1936
- Shield: Azure, a Greek Cross throughout Argent. The Inescutcheon features the Arms of the Greek line of the House of Schleswig-Holstein-Sonderburg-Glücksburg. (Greater coat of arms of Denmark used from 1819 to 1903, arms of King Christian IX of Denmark). The shield is then topped with a golden Royal Crown.
- Supporters: Two human figures representing the Greek mythological hero Herakles (Hercules), holding a wooden club and wearing the skin of the Nemean lion.
- Motto: "Ἰσχύς μου ἡ ἀγάπη τοῦ λαοῦ" translated: "The people's love is my strength"
- Order: Order of the Redeemer
- Other elements: A dark blue mantle and topped with another royal crown.

Following the return of the monarchy in 1935, the original smaller version of the coat of arms of Denmark representing the royal family was supplanted by the greater coat of arms of Denmark of 1819–1903, and consequently also in 1863 when the Danish prince William accepted the Greek throne as King George I. This greater arms included all the former elements, as well as the three crowns of the former Kalmar Union, the stockfish of Iceland, the ram of Faroe Islands, the polar bear of Greenland, the lion and hearts of the King of the Goths, the wyvern of the King of the Wends, the swan with a crown of Stormarn, and the knight on horseback of Dithmarschen.

During the 1941–1944 Axis occupation of Greece, the Greek puppet government used the republican escutcheon, "crowned with the depiction of the mythological Phoenix bird rising from its ashes, surrounded in between its wings by a contour of rays".

1833–1862
Greater coats of arms
King Otto

1863–1973
Greater coats of arms
Kingdom (House of Glücksburg)

1863–1973
Middle coats of arms without mantle
Kingdom (House of Glücksburg)

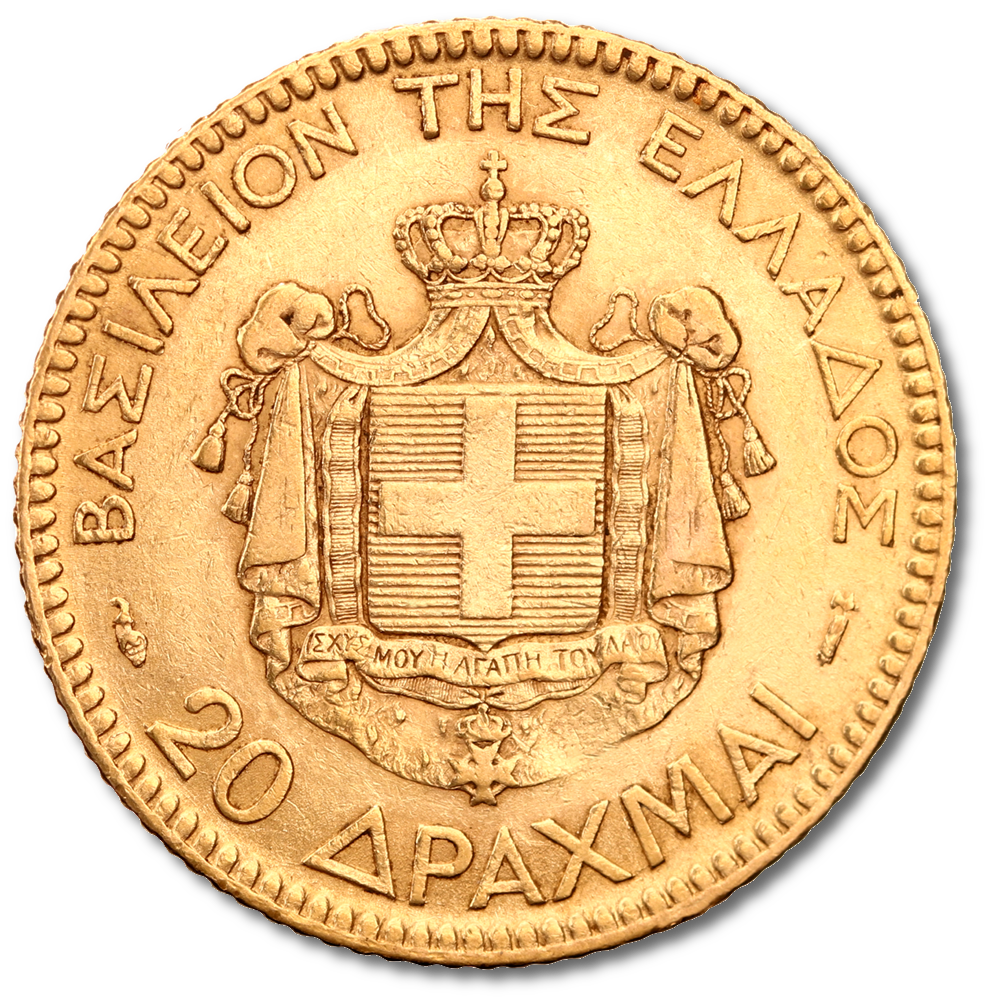
Greater coats of arms without supporters, on a 20-drachma coin (1884)

Greater royal arms 1863–1936
(with dynastic arms inescutcheon)

Second Republic
1924–1935

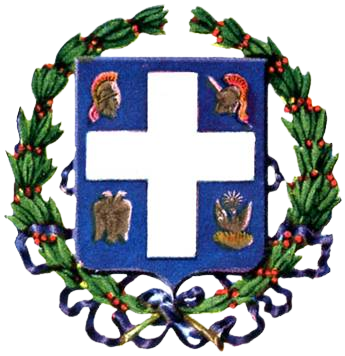
1925–26 version of the arms under the Pangalos dictatorship

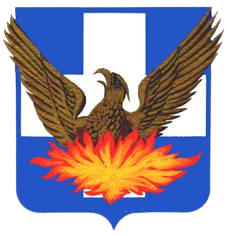
Arms with the phoenix superimposed, used during the Second Republic

Greater royal arms 1936–1973
(with dynastic arms inescutcheon)

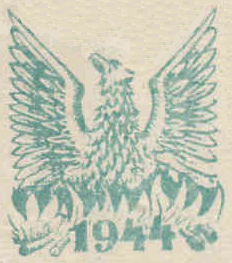
1944
Political Committee of National Liberation

1944
Political Committee of National Liberation

==== Junta-proclaimed republic (1973–1974) ====
In 1973, the then-ruling military junta abolished the monarchy, which was confirmed by a subsequent referendum. The constituent act that abolished the monarchy bore just the inscription "Government Gazette of the Hellenic Republic" (June 1, GG Issue 118 A). The following two issues (119 and 120, June 1 and 2 respectively), featured a phoenix rising from its ashes, with the soldier's silhouette clearly erased, in contrast with the "Phoenix and Soldier" design used widely before in coins, stamps, books, matchboxes and propaganda posters. Between June 5 and July 5 a new, rounded version of the phoenix appeared on Government Gazette issues, which was subsequently featured on ID cards, passports and other miscellaneous documents, such as lottery tickets, even after the finalization of the form of the phoenix. A rounded version was also adopted in new coinage. On July 5, the design of the phoenix was finalised. It was subsequently used on military uniforms, passports and other official uses, while seals and material adhering to previous designs were also considered valid.

Ioannides' regime did not abolish it; as such it was used till August 1, 1974, when the Karamanlis administration issued a GGI without it. No coat of arms was used whereas possible till June 7, 1975, when the current coat of arms was introduced; however, coins bearing the phoenix continued being legal tender for a period.

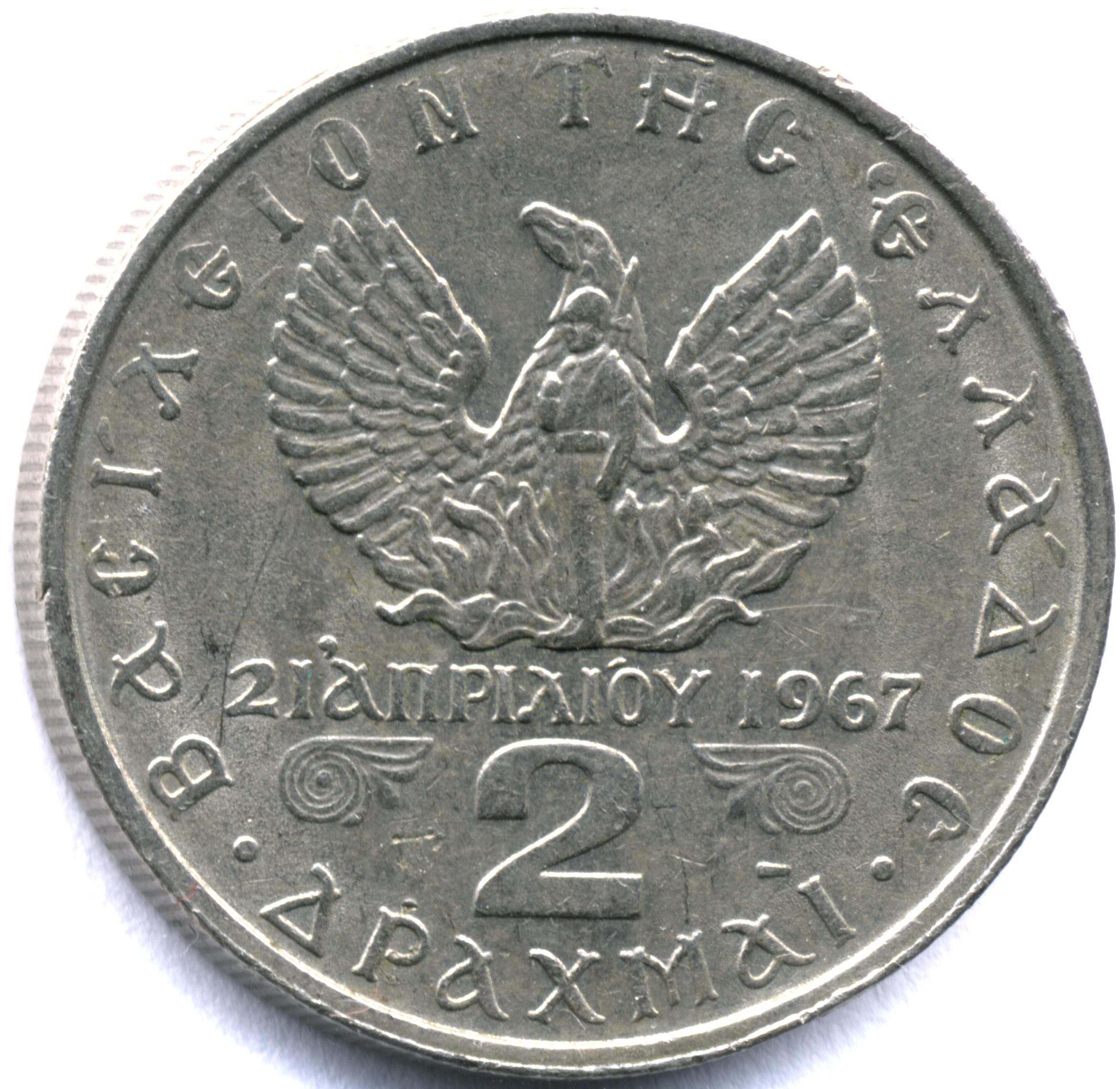
Semi-official "Phoenix and Soldier" emblem, as it appeared on currency from 1971 to 1973

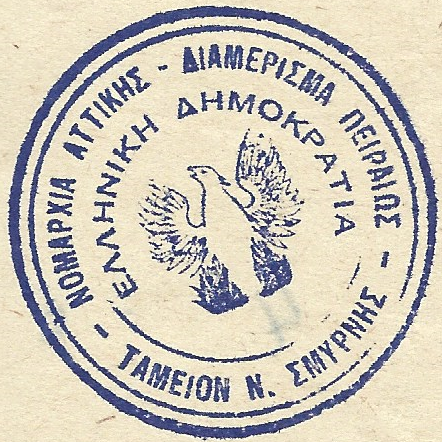
Seal with the first version of the phoenix emblem

The second version of the phoenix emblem (June 5 – July 5, 1973)

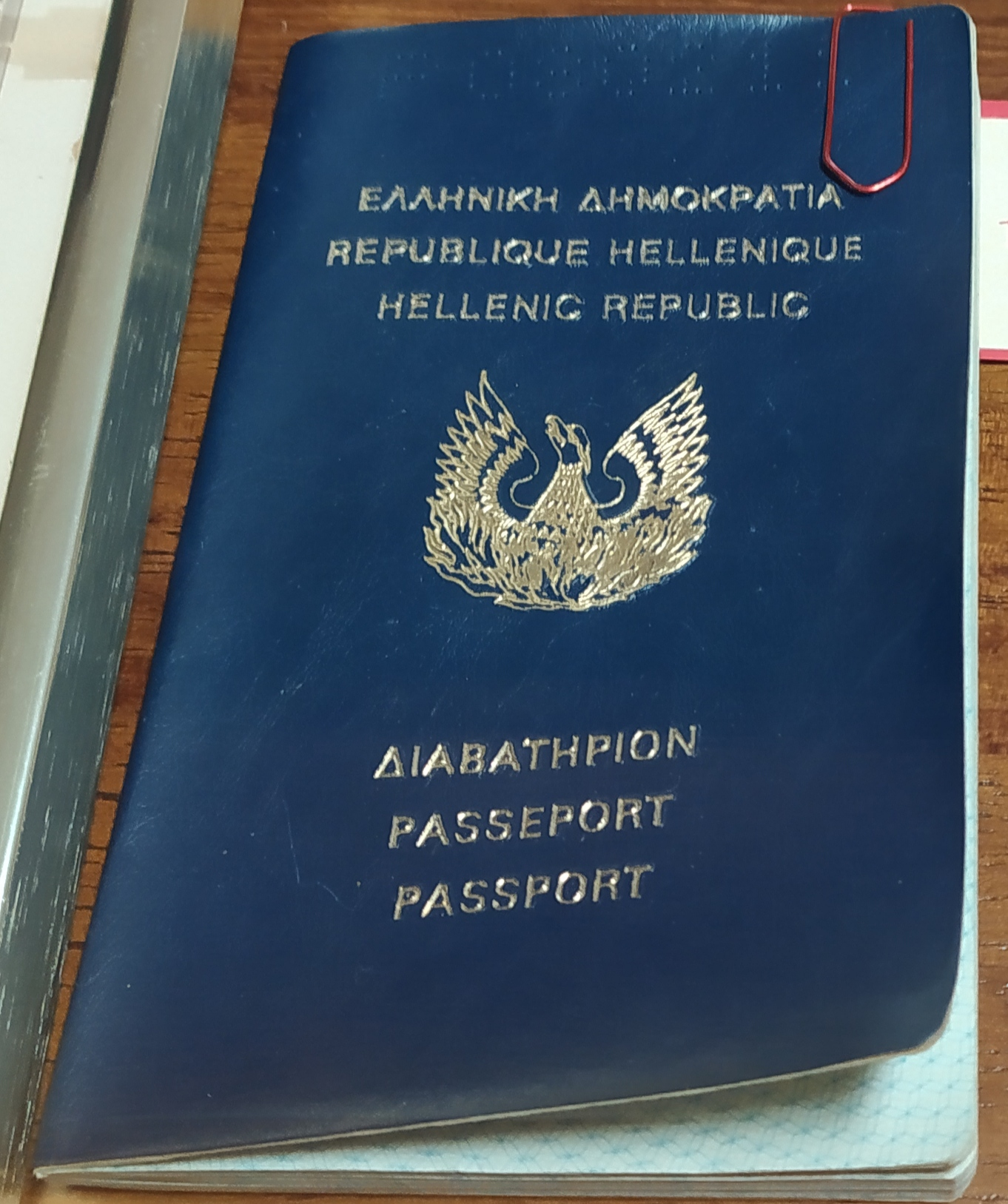
1973 passport bearing the second instance of the phoenix emblem

Third version of the phoenix emblem (July 5, 1973 – June 7, 1975)

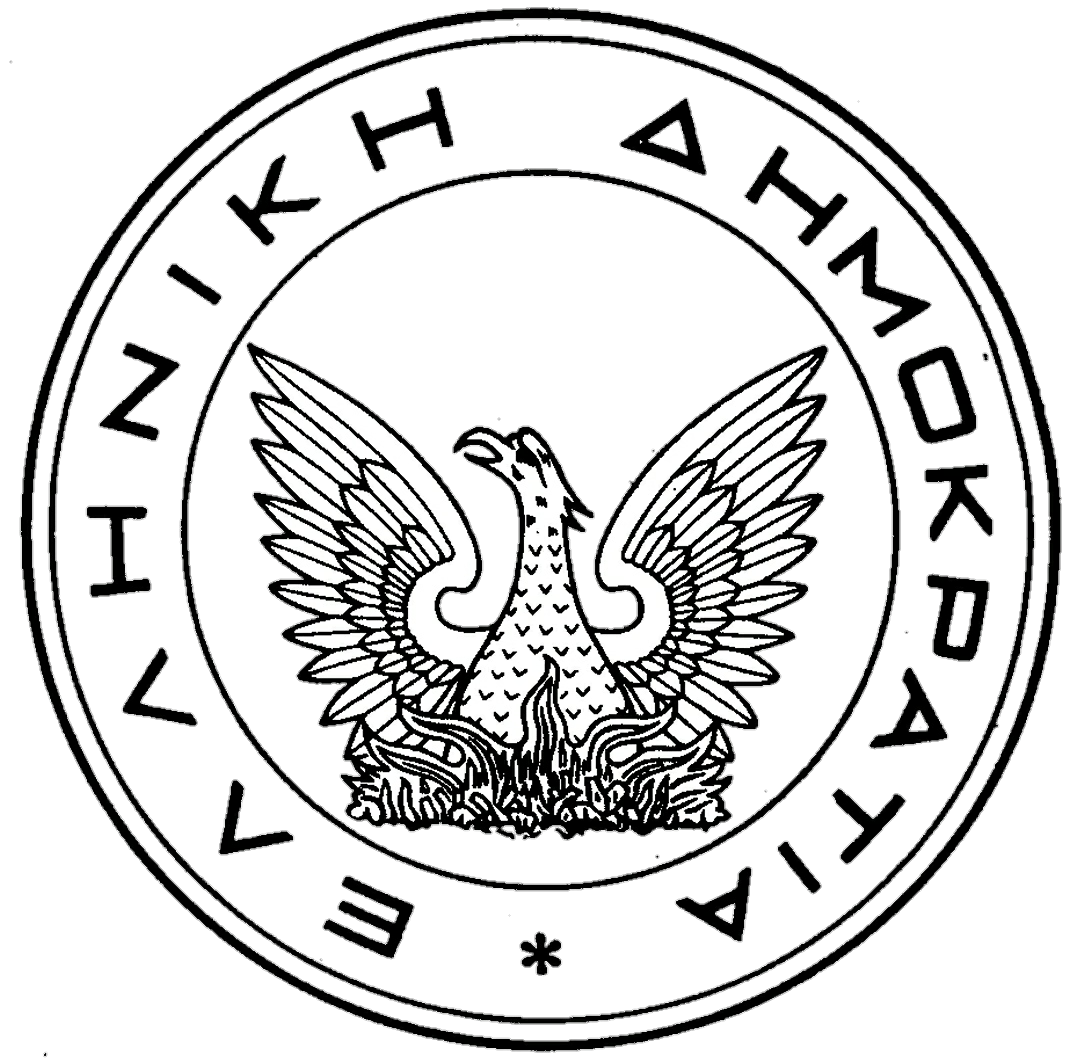
Great Seal of the State with the third version of the phoenix emblem

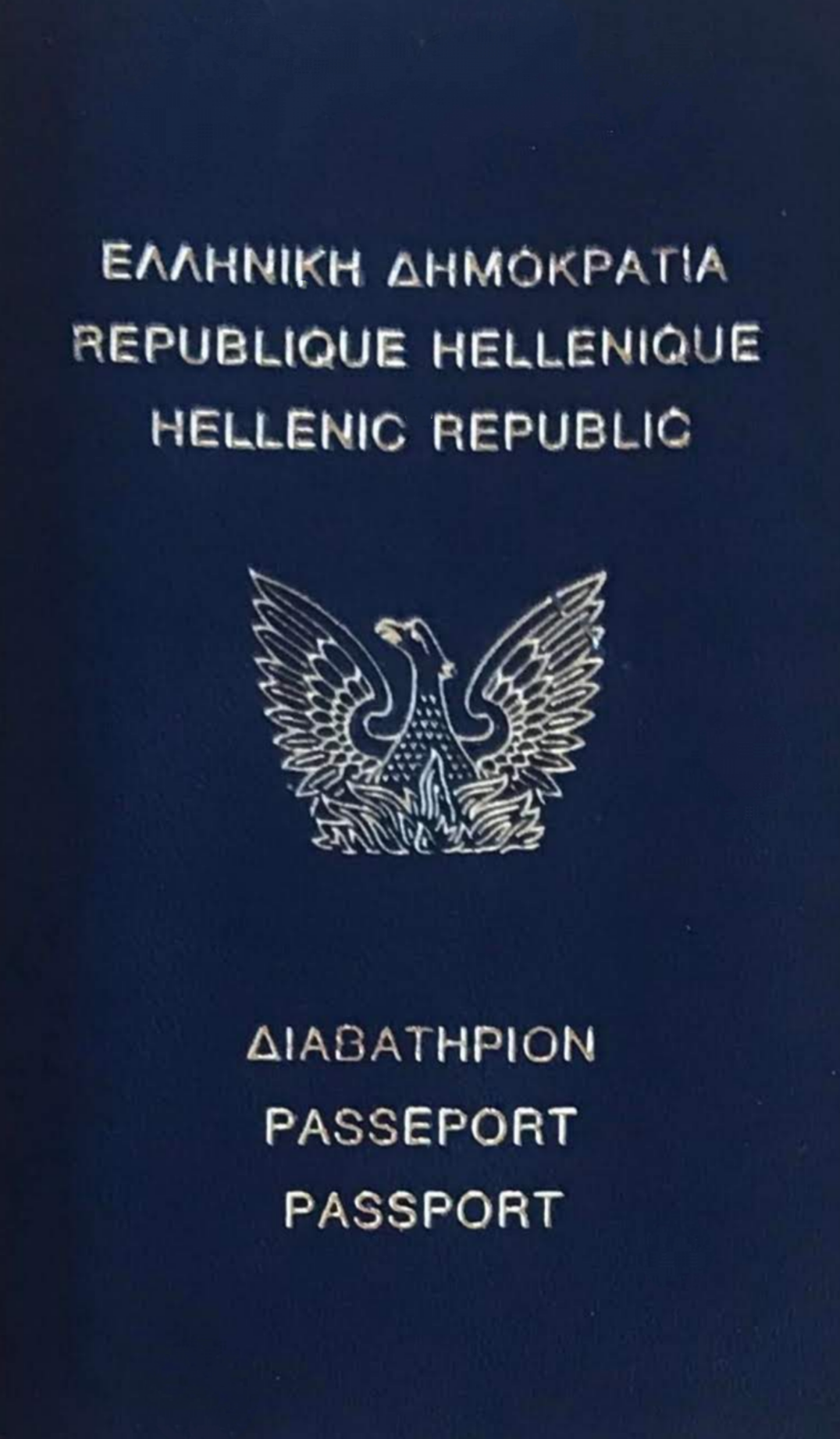
1973-1974 passport bearing the third instance of the phoenix emblem

After the collapse of the military regime in 1974, the new government decided to hold another referendum regarding the form of government as acts of the junta were considered to be illegal. The 1974 referendum resulted in the republican form of government being maintained. This confirmed the abolition of the royal coats of arms, but the achievement remains in use by the current pretenders of the Greek royal family.

== Current design ==
The current Great Seal (shown here in actual size), containing the coat of arms

The current emblem is defined by Law 48/1975. The blue shield with the white cross was restored, and the proportions of the escutcheon specified as 1/8 longer than its width. The shield is surrounded entirely by two branches of laurel; their colour is not specified but in practice they are almost universally shown as monochromatic. The coat of arms was designed in 1974 by Greek artist Kostas Grammatopoulos. The government uses a stylised version of the coat of arms as a government logo. The design was implemented beginning in 2010 as a means of standardising the branding of the various Greek government ministries. It specified the design and colour of the national emblem when used as a logo, and designated FF Meta as the official typeface for use across all media to represent the Government of Greece. Instead of showing the blue parts of the shield as solid colour, the government logo utilises heraldic hatching, with horizontal lines signifying azure (blue).

The Great Seal of the State (Μεγάλη του Κράτους Σφραγίς) is Greece's official Great Seal, used to confirm official documents. The current design was set out in the same law that specified the coat of arms in 1975; it is made up of the coat of arms, surrounded by the words Hellenic Republic (Ελληνική Δημοκρατία) in capital letters, contained within a circle 60 millimetres (2.4 in) in diameter. Previous Great Seals were also specified by previous decrees specifying the older coats of arms in 1833 and 1863.

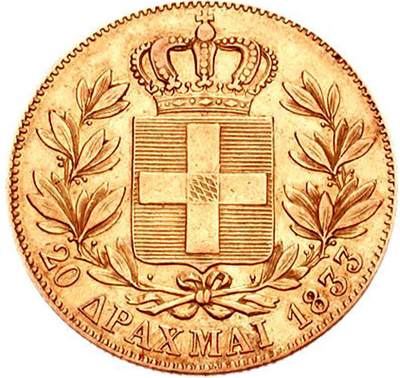
Minor version of the coat of arms with crown and laurel wreath on a 20-drachma coin (1833)

1975–present
Third Republic

1975–present
Third Republic
(military & presidential)

2003–present
Third Republic
(old government logo)

2010–present
Third Republic
(current government logo)

=== Colour ===
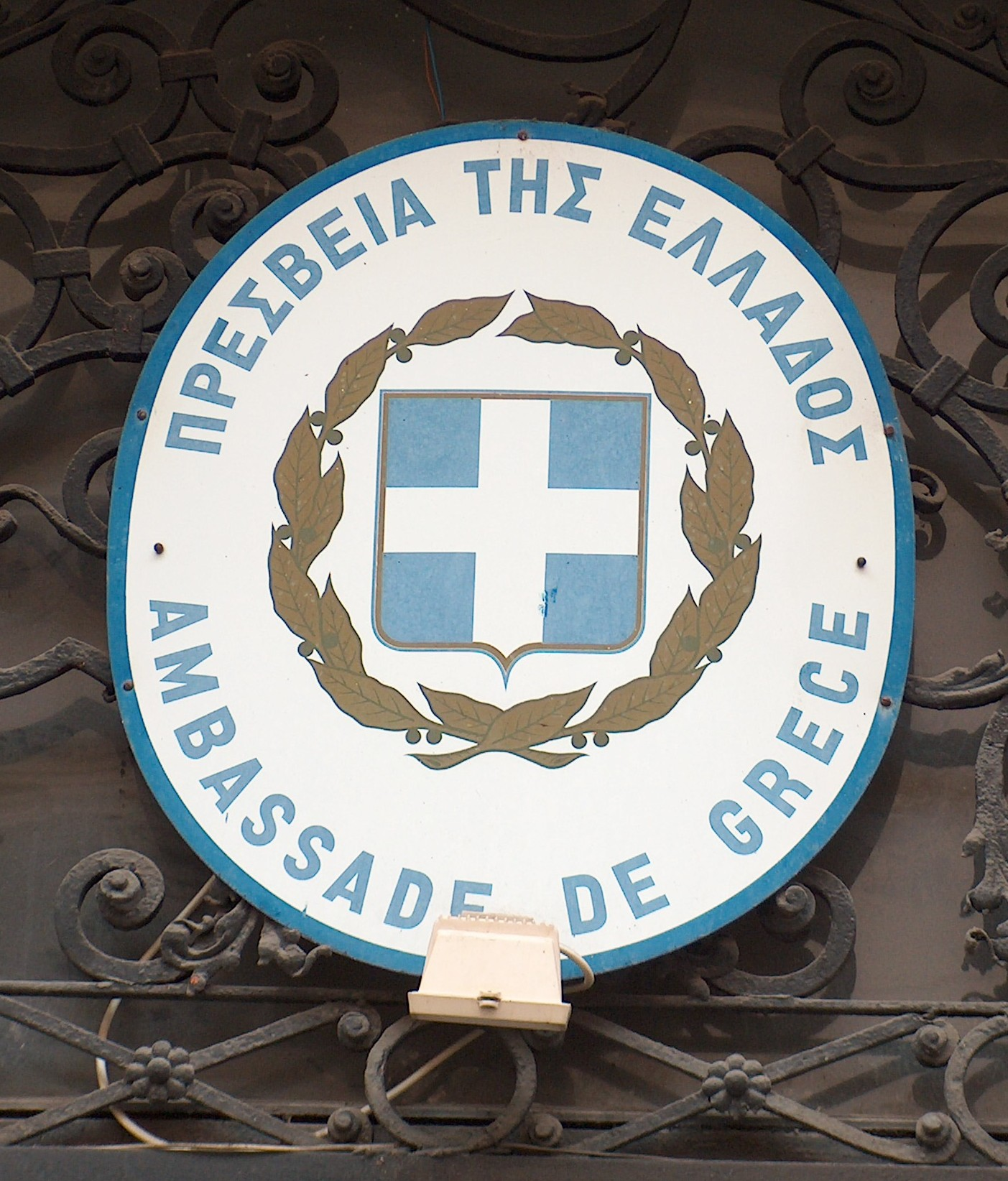
A Greek coat of arms with coloured laurel branches, used at an embassy

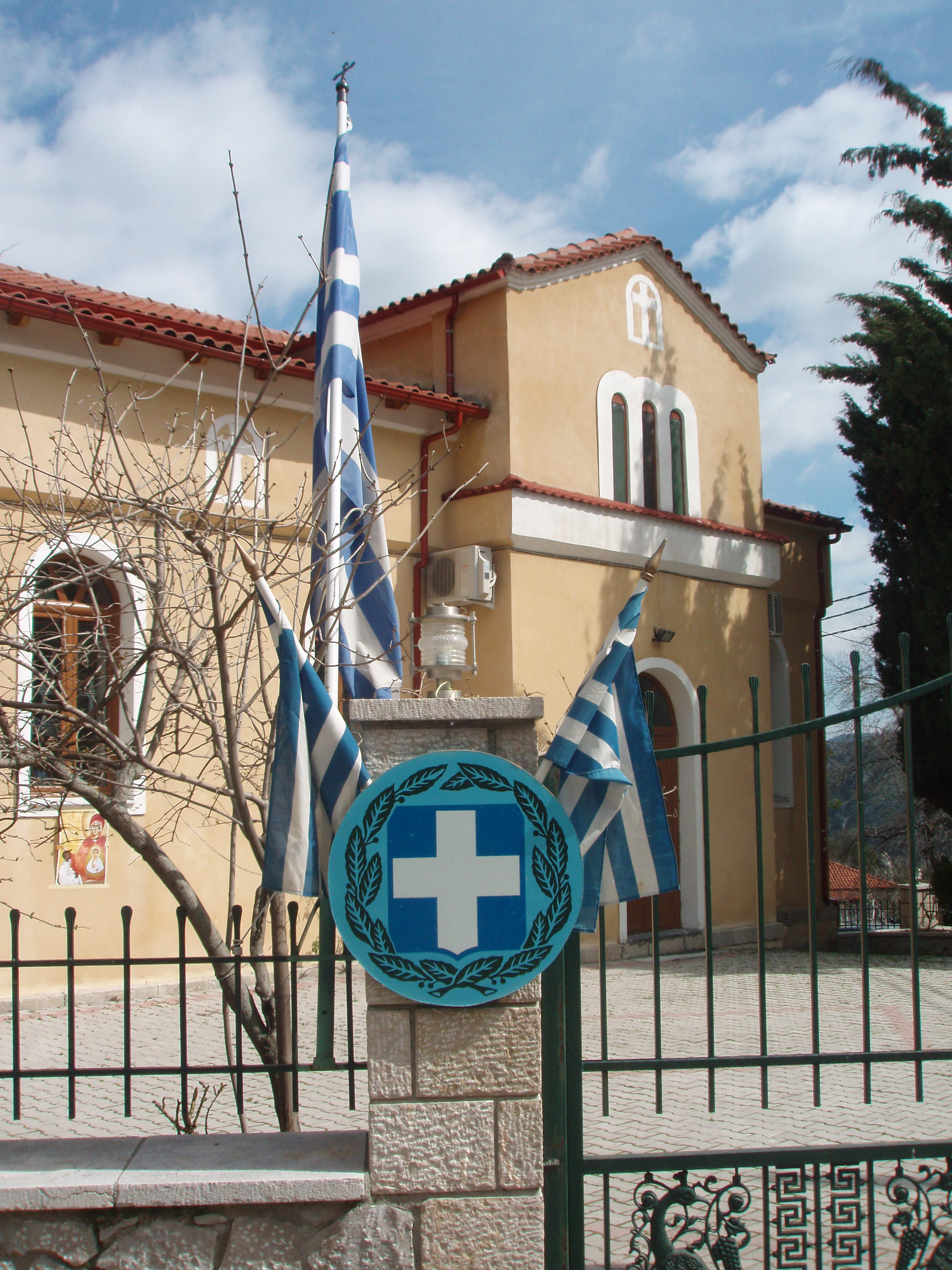
Common but unofficial rendering in proper tincture

The colours used to render the coat of arms are inconsistent. The original regulation does not specify a colour for the branches of laurel surrounding the escutcheon, implying that they should be green, or proper tincture. In effect, however, usage varies greatly. The 2003 version of the Civil Service Communications Regulations provide a scalable vector graphic file of the coat of arms in black, without specifying any colours. Other government guidelines, such as that used in the Publicity Guidelines for public works (as part of the European Globalisation Adjustment Fund), are heraldically inconsistent and require the laurel branches to be green (if not black-and-white), but the blue of the escutcheon is shown as horizontal hatching instead of solid colour. Similar guidelines were issued by the Independent Authority for Public Revenue as late as 2017. The most common usage is that of the laurel branches in monochrome. The general government guidelines which regulate the government logo are monochromatic, and so the laurel branches are not coloured.

The official shade of blue that the coat of arms should be rendered in is also not specified. Historically, the shade has varied from light blue under King Otto to darker shades in later years. Differing shades of blue were also used by different departments of the Government of Greece, until the guidelines regulating the government logo were implemented in 2010. These specified the various colour codes to be used:

- HEX #004588 as displayed digitally
- Pantone 280 U/C/M or CMYK 100/70/0/20

The military of Greece uses a version of the coat of arms which has the laurel branches in gold. The standard of the president of Greece also uses this design, in his capacity as nominal commander-in-chief of the armed forces. The various branches of the military have their own specifications for different types of usage. For example, the 2009 specifications for the colours of threads to be used on service caps, specified in CIELAB color space coordinates, were:

- 86.20/–2.66/49.65 for caps of type I (yellow thread)
- 73.49/4.58/42.12 for caps of type II (goldwork)
- 92.86/2.70/–9.50 for all caps
- 28.58/10.69/–39.83 for all caps

== See also ==
- Flag of Greece
- Armorial of Europe

== Sources ==
=== Primary ===
- Οδηγός επικοινωνίας και σχεδιασμού – Εφαρμογών εθνόσημου και υπουργείων [Communication and design guide – Applications for the national emblem and ministries] (PDF) (in Greek), Athens: Ministry of Culture and Sports, November 2010, archived from the original (PDF) on 25 December 2019

==== Government Gazettes ====
- Ἑφημερίς τῆς Κυβερνήσεως τοῦ Βασιλείου τῆς Ἑλλάδος / Regierungs-blatt des Koenigreichs Griechenland [Government Gazette of the Kingdom of Greece] (PDF). Α (in Greek and German). Vol. 2. Nafplio: Royal Printing House. 22 February 1833. p. 60. Archived from the original on 5 December 2024.
- Ἑφημερίς τῆς Κυβερνήσεως τοῦ Βασιλείου τῆς Ἑλλάδος / Regierungs-blatt des Koenigreichs Griechenland [Government Gazette of the Kingdom of Greece] (PDF) (in Greek and German). Vol. 8. Nafplio: Royal Printing House. 30 March 1833. p. 6. Archived from the original on 5 December 2024.
- Ἑφημερίς τῆς Κυβερνήσεως τοῦ Βασιλείου τῆς Ἑλλάδος [Government Gazette of the Kingdom of Greece] (PDF). A (in Greek). Vol. 44. Athens: National Printing House. 28 December 1863. pp. 230–231. Archived from the original on 5 December 2024.
- Ἑφημερίς τῆς Κυβερνήσεως τῆς Ἑλληνικὴς Δημοκρατίας [Government Gazette of the Hellenic Republic] (PDF). A (in Greek). Athens: National Printing House. 1 June 1973. p. 1068. Archived from the original on 5 December 2024.
- Ἑφημερίς τῆς Κυβερνήσεως τῆς Ἑλληνικὴς Δημοκρατίας [Government Gazette of the Hellenic Republic] (PDF). A (in Greek). Athens: National Printing House. 7 June 1975. pp. 617–618. Archived from the original on 5 December 2024.
- Ἑφημερίς τῆς Κυβερνήσεως τῆς Ἑλληνικὴς Δημοκρατίας [Government Gazette of the Hellenic Republic] (PDF). A (in Greek). Athens: National Printing House. 17 April 1979. p. 726. Archived from the original on 5 December 2024.

==== Legislative Decrees ====
- "Νομοθετικὸν Διάταγμα 180" [Legislative Decree 180] (PDF), Ἑφημερίς τῆς Κυβερνήσεως τῆς Ἑλληνικὴς Πολιτείας, A (in Greek), no. 196, Athens: National Printing House, pp. 975–976, 16 June 1941, archived from the original on 13 December 2024

=== Tertiary ===
- "Ἐμβλήματα καὶ θυρεός" [Emblems and arms]. Μεγάλη Ἐλληνικὴ Ἐγκυκλοπαιδεῖα, Τόμος Δέκατος. Ἑλλάς – Ἑλληνισμὸς (in Greek). Athens: Pyrsos Co. Ltd. 1934. p. 243. Archived from the original on 5 December 2024 – via the Digital Library of Modern Greek Studies "Anemi".
