= Charles du Fresne, sieur du Cange =

French philologist (1610–1688)

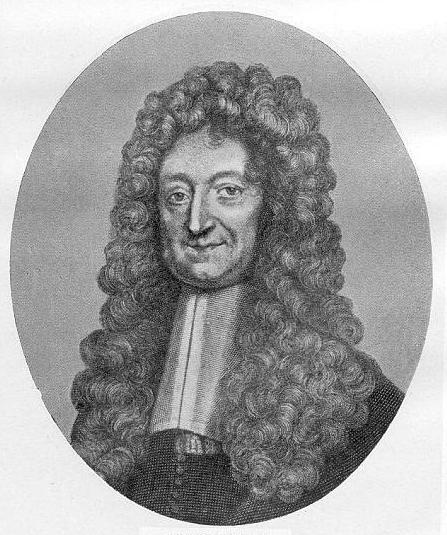
Charles du Fresne, medallion by David d'Angers in 1911

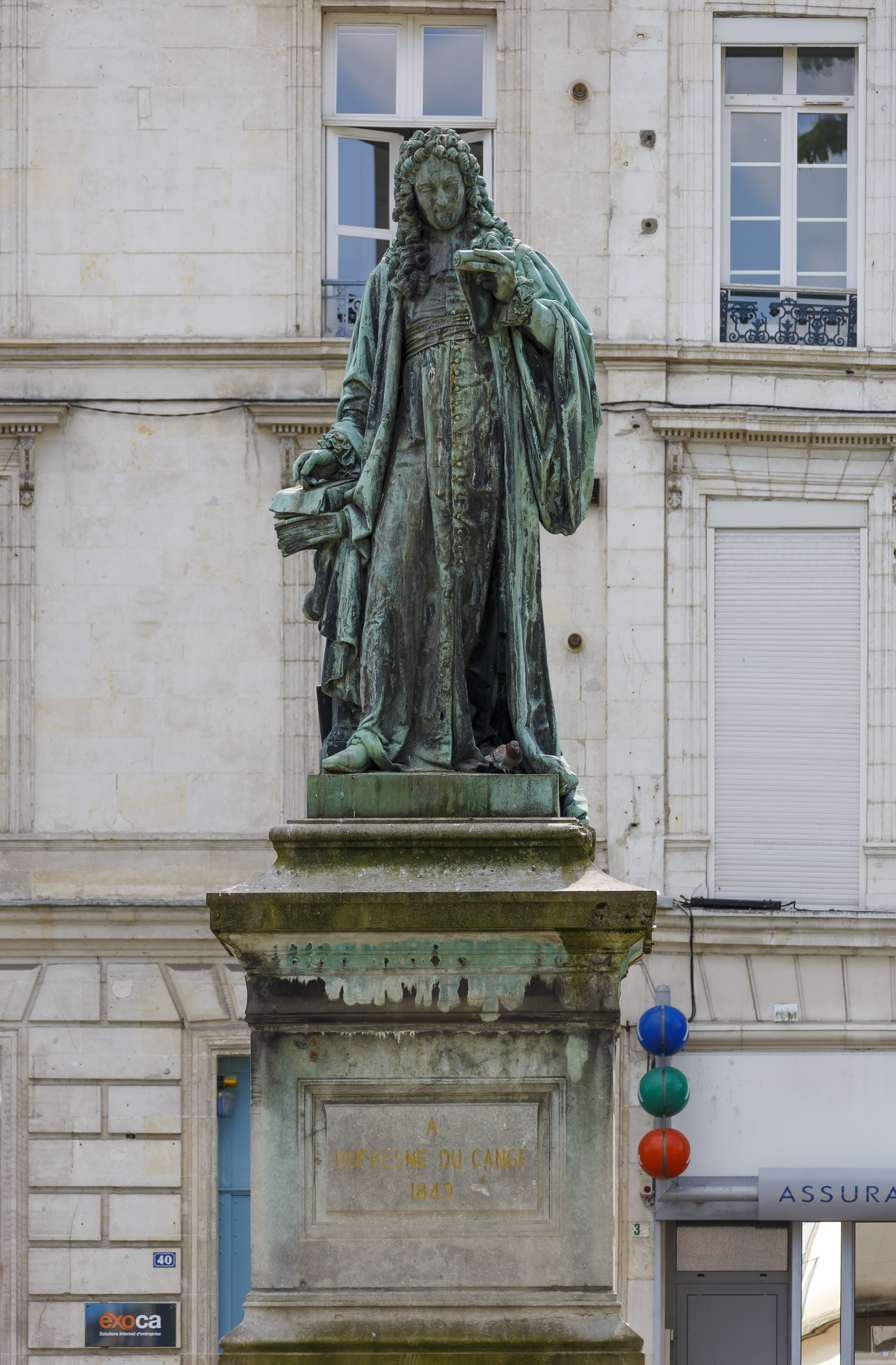
Monument of du Cange ("Dufresne du Cange") at the René Goblet Square, Amiens

Charles du Fresne, sieur du Cange (French: [ʃaʁl dy fʁɛn sjœʁ dy kɑ̃ʒ]; December 18, 1610 in Amiens – October 23, 1688 in Paris, aged 77), also known simply as Charles Dufresne, was a French philologist and historian of the Middle Ages and Byzantium.

== Life ==
Educated by Jesuits, du Cange studied law and practiced for several years before assuming the office of Treasurer of France. Du Cange was a busy, energetic man who pursued historical scholarship alongside his demanding official duties and his role as head of a large family.

Du Cange's most important work is his Glossarium ad scriptores mediae et infimae Latinitatis (Glossary of writers in medieval and late Latin, Paris, 1678, 3 vol.), revised and expanded under various titles, for example, Glossarium manuale ad scriptores mediae et infimae Latinitatis (Halae, 1772–1784) or from 1840 onward, Glossarium mediae et infimae Latinitatis (Glossary of medieval and late Latin). This work, together with a glossary of medieval and late Greek that he published ten years later, has gone through numerous editions and revisions and is still consulted frequently by scholars today. Du Cange's pioneering work distinguished medieval Latin and Greek from their earlier classical forms, marking the beginning of the study of the historical development of languages.

Du Cange mastered languages in order to pursue his main scholarly interests, medieval and Byzantine history. He corresponded voluminously with his fellow scholars. His great historical and linguistic knowledge was complemented by equally deep learning in archaeology, geography and law. In addition to his glossaries, he produced important new editions of Byzantine historians and a number of other works. His extensive history of Illyria was not published until 1746 by Joseph Keglevich, who partially corrected it.

Du Cange is one of the historians Edward Gibbon cites most frequently in his Decline and Fall of the Roman Empire. In one footnote he calls du Cange "our sure and indefatigable guide in the Middle Ages and Byzantine history."

== Works ==
- Du Cange, Charles du Fresne, sieur (1680). Historia Byzantina duplici commentario (in Latin). Paris: Louis Billaine.
- Du Cange, et al., Glossarium mediae et infimae Latinitatis, Niort: L. Favre, 1883–1887 (10 vol.). searchable full-text online edition, by the École nationale des chartes
- Glossarium mediae et infimae Latinitatis images online on the French National Library's website
- Glossarium mediae et infimae Latinitatis 7-volume (1840-1850) on the Stanford University Library website
- Glossarium ad scriptores mediae et infimae Graecitatis, Lugduni: Apud Anissonios, 1688 (2 vol.). Glossarium ad scriptores mediae et infimae Graecitatis from the Digital Library of Modern Greek Studies "Anemi", University of Crete, Greece
- Les Familles d'Outremer at the Internet Archive
- Du Cange, Charles (1610–1688). Historia Byzantina Familiae Byzantinae (in Latin). Paris.
