= List of Greek flags =

This is a list of flags used in the modern state of Greece or historically used by Greeks.

== National flag ==
Flag	Date	Use	Description
	In use since 1822 (as the Greek naval ensign), and from 1978 onwards as the sole national flag.	The current flag of Greece was adopted by the First National Assembly at Epidaurus in January 1822 as the official naval ensign of the country. Between 1822 and 1978, this flag was flown on Greek vessels and also used for foreign service. In 1978, it was established as the sole national flag of Greece, and as the war and civil ensign, and has been used in that capacity ever since.	Nine horizontal stripes of equal width; five blue alternating with four white. Number nine stands for the syllables of the national motto of Greece. Blue canton of square shape, five stripes wide, bearing a white Greek cross at its center, with the arms of the cross being one stripe wide. Canton and stripe elements combined properly, in a harmonious and complementary fashion. Flag ratio is 2:3 and color shade is traditionally intermediate, neither light, nor dark, although its precise shade is not officially stipulated by law.

== Presidential standard ==
Flag	Date	Use	Description
	Since 1979	Distinguishing flag of the president of the Hellenic Republic (president of Greece). Used to show the presence of the President of the Republic (in vehicles, buildings etc.). This flag also used as a rank flag in the Hellenic Navy's ships mainmast when the President of the Republic is aboard.	Square blue flag bearing the coat of arms of Greece at its center: Greek cross argent, escutcheon azure, laurel wreath or, field azure. (A white Greek cross on a blue shield, surrounded by a golden laurel wreath.)
	1973–1974	Presidential flag during the republican phase of the Regime of the Colonels (June 1973 – July 1974).	A golden phoenix rising from the flames on a dark "midnight blue" background.
	1924–1935	Presidential flag during the Second Hellenic Republic.	A white cross on a blue field.

=== Royal standards ===
Flag	Date	Use	Description
	1936–1974	Royal standard of the king, adopted in 1936.	Like the Navy jack, with the royal family arms in the centre and four crowns in the quarters.
	1936–1974	Standard of the crown prince, adopted in 1936.	Like the Navy jack, with the Greek royal family arms in the centre and one crown in the first quarter.
	1936–1974	Standard used by the Greek royal family, adopted in 1936.	Like the Navy jack, with the Greek royal family arms in the centre but no additional crowns.
	1963–1964	Personal flag of Queen Frederica of Greece.	
	1914–1924	Standard used by the crown prince, adopted in 1914. The flag was made redundant after the abolition of the monarchy in 1924. Following the restoration of the monarchy in 1935, the 1914 decrees regarding Greek flags and those of the royal family were reinstated by decree of 7 November 1935. This flag was replaced in 1936 with a new design.	Like the Navy jack, but in a light blue field. In the first and third quarter is a royal crown.
	1935–1936	Standard used by the crown prince, adopted in 1914. The flag was made redundant after the abolition of the monarchy in 1924. Following the restoration of the monarchy in 1935, the 1914 decrees regarding Greek flags and those of the royal family were reinstated by decree of 7 November 1935. This flag was replaced in 1936 with a new design.	Like the Navy jack, but in a light blue field. In the first and third quarter is a royal crown.
	1914–1924	Standard of the queen of Greece (in this case, showing the arms of Sophia of Prussia), adopted in 1914. The flag was made redundant after the abolition of the monarchy in 1924. Following the restoration of the monarchy in 1935, the 1914 decrees regarding Greek flags and those of the royal family were reinstated by decree of 7 November 1935.	
	1935–1936	Standard of the queen of Greece (in this case, showing the arms of Sophia of Prussia), adopted in 1914. The flag was made redundant after the abolition of the monarchy in 1924. Following the restoration of the monarchy in 1935, the 1914 decrees regarding Greek flags and those of the royal family were reinstated by decree of 7 November 1935.	
	1914–1924	Standard used by the other members of the royal family, adopted in 1914. The flag was made redundant after the abolition of the monarchy in 1924. Following the restoration of the monarchy in 1935, the 1914 decrees regarding Greek flags and those of the royal family were reinstated by decree of 7 November 1935.	
	1935–1936	Standard used by the other members of the royal family, adopted in 1914. The flag was made redundant after the abolition of the monarchy in 1924. Following the restoration of the monarchy in 1935, the 1914 decrees regarding Greek flags and those of the royal family were reinstated by decree of 7 November 1935.	
	1914–1917	Royal standard of the king, adopted in 1914. The crossed marshal's batons refer to King Constantine I, who was raised to the rank in 1913. The flag was in use during Constantine I's two reigns, 1913–1917 and 1920–1922.	Like the Navy jack, but in a light blue field with the Arms of King Constantine I at the center. Behind the arms are two crossed Field Marshal's batons.
	1920–1922	Royal standard of the king, adopted in 1914. The crossed marshal's batons refer to King Constantine I, who was raised to the rank in 1913. The flag was in use during Constantine I's two reigns, 1913–1917 and 1920–1922.	Like the Navy jack, but in a light blue field with the Arms of King Constantine I at the center. Behind the arms are two crossed Field Marshal's batons.
	1913–1914	Personal flag of Queen Olga of Greece as Queen Mother, as specified in the Royal Decree of 3 June 1914.	
Personal flag of King George I of Greece	1863–1913	Standard used by King George I of Greece.	The flag consists of the plain cross version of the national flag, with a royal coat of arms of Greece superimposed in the center of the cross.
	1863–1913	Royal standard reported during the early years of King George I's reign.	Swallow-tailed Greek flag and the coat of arms of House of Glücksburg.
Flag of the Principality of Samos	1832–1862	Royal standard during reign of King Otto.	The flag consists of a square plain cross version of the flag with the monogram of King Otto of Greece in the middle.
Royal standard during the late reign of King Otto	1858–1862	Royal standard for use on ships during the late reign of King Otto, adopted in 1858.	The flag consists of the plain cross version of the national flag in 3:2 proportions, with the Bavarian arms of the Wittelsbach dynasty superimposed in the center of the cross, topped by a crown. The blue color is of a lighter shade than usual today.
Royal standard during the reign of King Otto	1833–1858	Royal standard for use on ships during most of the reign of King Otto, adopted in 1833.	The flag consists of the plain cross version of the national flag in 10:7 proportions, with the Bavarian arms of the Wittelsbach dynasty superimposed in the center of the cross, topped by a crown. The blue color is of a lighter shade than usual today.

== Military flags ==
=== Hellenic Armed Forces ===
Flag	Date	Use	Description
	1950–present	Flag of the Hellenic National Defence General Staff.	
	1950–present	Rank flag of the Chief of the Hellenic National Defence General Staff – Army variant.	
	1950–present	Rank flag of the Chief of the Hellenic National Defence General Staff – Navy variant.	
	1950–present	Rank flag of the Chief of the Hellenic National Defence General Staff – Air force variant.	

=== Hellenic Army ===
Flag	Date	Use	Description
		Army war flag (regimental colour)(Πολεμική Σημαία Στρατού Ξηράς)	A square flag with a white cross on blue field with an image of Saint George slaying the dragon.
	1904–present	Flag of the Hellenic Army General Staff.	The seal of the Hellenic Army on three stripes red, green, and red with white borders in-between.
	?–present	Hellenic Army general flag.	A red flag with four white six-pointed stars in the centre.
	?–present	Hellenic Army lieutenant general flag.	A red flag with three white six-pointed stars in the centre.
	?–present	Hellenic Army major general flag.	A red flag with two white six-pointed stars in the centre.
	?–present	Hellenic Army brigadier general flag.	A red flag with one white six-pointed star in the centre.

=== Hellenic Navy ===
Flag	Date	Use	Description
	1822–present	Jack of the Hellenic Navy.	A square flag with a white cross on a blue field. A golden crown was added in the centre during the periods of monarchy (1833–1924 and 1935–1973).
	1822–present	Commissioning pennant (Greek: Επισείων Πολεμικού Πλοίου, i.e., "Warship Pennant") flown by all Hellenic Navy's ships and establishments in commission, unless displaced by a senior officer's rank flag.	"Warship pennant, blue coloured, has shape of isosceles triangle elongated, bearing a white cross near the base of the triangle". The flag has typically base to length (height of triangle) 1 to 20. The cross has arms width 1/5 base length and each arm length 3/5 of base length. The pennant flown on the top of mainmast.
	?–present	Flag of the Hellenic Navy General Staff.	The seal of the Hellenic Navy on three stripes white, red, and white with a blue outer border.
	?–present	Rank flag of the admiral of the Hellenic Navy.	A square flag with a white cross on a blue field with a star in all four quarters.
	1956–present	Rank flag of the prime minister of Greece aboard Hellenic Navy vessels.	Like the Hellenic Navy jack, with three white rising diagonal stripes in the first quarter.
	1956–present	Rank flag of the Greek minister of national defence aboard Hellenic Navy vessels.	Like the Hellenic Navy jack, with three white rising diagonal stripes in the first quarter and three descending stripes in the third.
	1956–present	Rank flag for ministers of the Hellenic Republic.	Like the Hellenic Navy jack, with three white rising diagonal stripes in the first and the third quarter.

=== Hellenic Air Force ===
Flag	Date	Use	Description
	?–present	Air Force war flag (regimental colour) (Πολεμική Σημαία Αεροπορίας)	A square flag with a white cross on a blue field with an image of Archangel Michael in the middle.
	?–present	Flag of the Hellenic Air Force General Staff.	The seal of the Hellenic Air Force on three stripes blue, yellow and blue with red borders in-between.
	?–present	Air chief marshal flag.	A light blue flag with four white six-pointed stars in the centre.
	?–present	Air marshal flag.	A light blue flag with three white six-pointed stars in the centre.
	?–present	Air vice-marshal flag.	A light blue flag with two white six-pointed stars in the centre.
	?–present	Brigadier of the Air Force flag.	A light blue flag with one white six-pointed star in the centre.

=== Hellenic Coast Guard ===
Flag	Date	Use	Description
	?–present	Service flag of the Hellenic Coast Guard.	Seven horizontal stripes, white and blue, with the emblem of the Hellenic Coast Guard.
	?–present	House flag of Hellenic Coast Guard vessels.	Fifteen vertical blue and white stripes with two blue anchors crossed and a white canton in the upper hoist corner with the national emblem of Greece in the centre.

== Regional and municipal flags ==
Flag	Date	Use	Description
Regional Flags
Flag of Macedonia	1980–present	Flag of the historical region of Macedonia.	Blue field with the golden Vergina Sun in the centre. The flag is unofficial but widely recognized in Greece.
Municipal Flags
Link to flag		Municipal flag of Athens.	The flag is blue with an inner gold and outer red border. A white Greek cross lies in the middle, charged with a disc with a white border featuring gold olive branches. The blue disc in the center features the head of the goddess Athena.
		Municipal flag of Thessaloniki.	Dark blue with a stylized depiction of the city's main landmark, the White Tower, and an ancient Macedonian coin depicting Alexander the Great.
		Municipal flag of Rhodes (city).	The seal of the city of Rhodes, depicting the head of Helios, on a blue gray background.
		Flag of Corfu island.	The flag of Corfu had a dark red/maroon/purple large outer border, a dark gold thin inner border and a very dark blue field with the seal in the centre in dark gold. The seal shows an ancient Greek Corfiot sailing ship. ΔΗΜΟΣ (Municipality) is written above the seal, ΚΕΡΚΥΡΑΣ (of Corfu), below the seal. The flag, on which the image shown above is based, had a ratio of 11:19.
		Flag of Zakynthos island.	Dark green with an orange depiction of Zakynthos with the island's motto "Freedom needs virtue and courage" (ΘΕΛΕΙ ΑΡΕΤΗ ΚΑΙ ΤΟΛΜΗ Η ΕΛΕΥΘΕΡΙΑ, from Andreas Kalvos' The Lyre).
		Flag of Aegina island.	
	1821–present	The flag of Kastelorizo, used as an ensign for ships from Kastelorizo during the Greek War of Independence, now a municipal flag.	
	1821–present	The flag of Hydra island, used as an ensign for ships from Hydra during the Greek War of Independence, now a municipal flag.	
	1821–present	The flag of Psara, used as an ensign for ships from Psara during the Greek War of Independence, now a municipal flag.	White cloth bordered with red with a large red cross and the inscriptions of the motto Eleftheria i Thanatos (Liberty or Death) in capital red letters. The cross is standing on an upside down crescent, symbolizing the Ottoman Empire, flanked on one side by a lance, on the other by an anchor, around which is coiled a serpent eating a bird.
	1821–present	The flag of Spetses, used as an ensign for ships from Spetses during the Greek War of Independence, now a municipal flag.	

== Historical flags ==
Flag	Date	Use	Description
	1970–1975	Flag of Greece used by the Regime of the Colonels.	Similar to the current flag, but with two major differences: instead of intermediate blue, the shade of midnight blue is used; also, instead of 2:3 the aspect ratio is 7∶12 in this variation.
State and War flag on land during the Greek royal family	1863–1924	State and war flag of the Kingdom of Greece.	The flag consists of a white cross on a field of blue with a golden royal crown superimposed in the center of the cross.
State and War flag on land during the Greek royal family	1935–1970	State and war flag of the Kingdom of Greece.	The flag consists of a white cross on a field of blue with a golden royal crown superimposed in the center of the cross.
First National Flag of Greece	1822–1863	In January 1822, the First National Assembly at Epidaurus adopted this design to replace the multitude of local revolutionary flags then in use. Since 1828, this flag was flown inside the country, while the current flag was flown on naval vessels and abroad.	White cross on a blue field. During the periods of monarchy (1833–1924 and 1935–1973), a golden crown was often added in the centre of official flags (see examples below).
First National Flag of Greece	1924–1935	In January 1822, the First National Assembly at Epidaurus adopted this design to replace the multitude of local revolutionary flags then in use. Since 1828, this flag was flown inside the country, while the current flag was flown on naval vessels and abroad.	White cross on a blue field. During the periods of monarchy (1833–1924 and 1935–1973), a golden crown was often added in the centre of official flags (see examples below).
	1955–1959	Flag of EOKA, the Cypriot Greek nationalist guerilla organisation from the 1950s.	White cross on a blue field. The inscription reads: "Ελευθερία ή Θάνατος, Ζήτω η Ελλάς" (Freedom or Death, Long live Greece).
	1944–present	Known as the Flag of Athenian Liberty, it was first hoisted on the Acropolis of Athens on the liberation of the city from Nazi occupation on 12 October 1944, a ceremony which is repeated every year on the anniversary of liberation.	The old national flag, with a depiction of the seal of the Athenian association in the centre.
	1919–1923	Flag of the proposed state of the Republic of Pontus.	The naval version of the Greek flag with a facing black eagle superimposed in the centre of the cross in the canton.
	1914–1923	Flag used by pontic Greek self-defense groups and guerillas during the Pontic Greek Genocide.	Resembles the land flag but with a black facing eagle on a golden disc superimposed in the middle. The eagle design derives from 4th century BC coins from Sinope.
	1914	Flag of the Autonomous Republic of Northern Epirus. It is used until today by many Northern Epirotes.	Resembles the land flag but with a black two-headed eagle superimposed in the middle. Beneath it are the Greek letters "Α" and "Η" that stand for "Αυτόνομη Ήπειρος" (Autonomous Epirus) and the year 1914, the year of its foundation.
	1912	Flag of the Free State of Ikaria.	During the Balkan wars, the inhabitants of the Greek island of Ikaria revolted against the Ottoman Empire establishing a short-lived independent nation called the Free State of Ikaria (Ελευθέρα Πολιτεία Ικαρίας). The neighboring islands complex of Fournoi-Korseon also joined Ikaria.
Flag of the Principality of Samos	1834–1912	Flag of the autonomous Principality of Samos, tributary to the Ottoman Empire.	The flag consists of the plain cross version of the Greek national flag, with the upper half field in the red of the Ottoman flag.
	1834–1912	Princely flag of the autonomous Principality of Samos, tributary to the Ottoman Empire.	The flag consists of a white triangle on blue background, bearing a red Greek cross in the centre.
Flag of the Cretan State	1898–1908	Flag of the autonomous Cretan State.	The flag consists of the plain cross version of the Greek national flag, with the canton in red with a white five-pointed star, symbolising Ottoman suzerainty. It was not popular during its period of official use, as Cretans wanted union with Greece, and was de facto abolished following the island's unilateral proclamation of union with Greece in September 1908.
	1897–1898	Cretan revolutionary flag of the 1897 revolt.	
	1878–1885	Flag of Eastern Rumelia in Northern Thrace.	Three horizontal stripes red, white, and blue.
	1878	Flag of the 1878 Cretan Insurrection.	The design of the flag above is a series of six stripes, the blue ones only stretching to 4/5 of the flag. The banner contains the words "ΗΤΑΝ ΗΕΠΙΤΑΝ" (expression of the Spartan women, when they would send off their sons into war implying: [I will wait for you] either with this [the shield, victorious], or on this [wounded or dead]) on the second white stripe, followed by a likely date of the rebellion, August 16, on the third white stripe. On the first two stripes, on the extreme right corner, a Greek cross is displayed.
	1878	Flag of West Macedonia during the 1878 revolt.	
Flag used during the siege of Arkadi	1866	Flag used in the Arkadi Monastery by Christian Cretans supporting union with Greece, during the Great Cretan Revolt of 1866–1869.	The flag consists of the plain cross version of the Greek national flag, featuring the initials of the motto Κρήτη, Ένωσις, Ελευθερία ή Θάνατος ("Crete, Enosis, Freedom or Death"), and the cross with the inscription ΙΣ ΧΣ ΝΙΚΑ ("Jesus Christ Conquers").
Flag of the Ionian Islands under British rule	1817–1864	Flag of the United States of the Ionian Islands, a British protectorate from 1815 until its unity with Greece in 1864.	The flag is a variation of the British colonial Blue Ensign, with red bordering. It is defaced with the islands' emblem, a variant of the Venetian "Lion of St. Mark" holding seven bundled arrows, representing the unity of the seven Ionian Islands, with the Bible superimposed on them.
Flag of the Septinsular Republic	1800–1807	Flag of the Septinsular Republic, the first modern Greek self-governing state, comprising the Ionian Islands, under joint Russian and Ottoman suzerainty.	The flag depicts the "Lion of St. Mark", the symbol of the Republic of Venice, under whose rule the Ionian Islands were until 1797. The lion holds seven bundled arrows, representing the unity of the seven islands, with the Bible superimposed on them.
	1807	Flag of captain Ioannis Stathas, designed in the island of Skiathos. It resembles the old flag and the jack of the Hellenic Navy.	White cross on an azure field.
	1807	Flag of Central Macedonia designed by chieftain Nikolaos Tsamis against the Ottoman Empire.	An azure Greek cross on a white field. The flag also bore the inscription: "Σημαία Ελληνική, Νικόλαος Τσάμης" (Greek Flag, Nikolaos Tsamis).
	c.a 1800	Flag of the Kallergis family used before the revolution.	The flag shares a lot of similarities with the current flag and bears the phrase "EN TOYTΩ NIKA" (In hoc signo vinces, eng: In this sign thou shalt conquer). Heraldic ensembles containing the Kallergis family coat of arms (bendy argent and azure) can be found all over the island of Crete, in churches and other monuments.
Flag of the Maniots	c.a 1793	Flag proposed by Rigas Feraios for his envisioned pan-Balkan Federation.	Three red, white, and black horizontal stripes. Red stands for the imperial purple, white for the righteousness of the fight against tyranny, and black for the death in the struggle for liberty. It also features three crosses for the Christian nations of the Balkans, and the club of Hercules in the middle.
	1774–1800s	This flag, the so-called "Graeco-Ottoman" ensign (Γραικοθωμανική παντιέρα), was allowed for use by Greek merchant ships during the latter stages of Ottoman rule.	The flag consists of three horizontal stripes in the colours red (for the Ottoman Empire), blue (for the Greeks), and red.
	1770–1821	This design appeared in the Orlov revolt, based on older patterns. Used among others by the Kolokotronis family, this flag, with variations, was the most widely used throughout Greece during the initial stages of the 1821 revolution.	A blue or cyan cross over a white field.
Greek War of Independence
Flag of Filiki Eteria	1814–1821	The flag of the Filiki Eteria.	
Flag of the Maniots	1821–1822	The flag of the fighters of the autonomous Mani Peninsula.	A blue Greek cross on white background, with the words "Victory or Death" and the ancient Spartan motto "With it or upon it" in gold.
	1820–1823	Flag raised by the leader of the Souliotes, Markos Botsaris, in Souli, October 1820, after their exile in the Ionian islands.	The flag depicts St. George and reads in Greek: "Freedom", "Fatherland", "Religion".
	1821–1825	The flag of the Areopagus of Eastern Continental Greece, a regional administration during the Greek Revolution.	The flag consists of three vertical stripes in the colours green, white, and black. The cross stands for Orthodox Christianity, the flaming heart for the will to fight for independence, and the anchor for the steadfastness of purpose.
	1821–1829	Flag used by admirals of the revolutionary navy during the Greek War of Independence.	Horizontal tricolor of yellow, blue, and white with a wreath and cross, the motto "Ελευθερία ή Θάνατος" (Freedom or Death) is written on the bottom.
Flag of Samos	1821–1834	Flag of the Military-Political System of Samos during the Greek War of Independence.	
Flag of the Sacred Band	1821	Flag of the Sacred Band.	Three red, white, and black horizontal stripes with a golden phoenix rising in the middle and reads in Greek: "Εκ της κόνεώς μου αναγεννώμαι" (From my ashes I am reborn.)
Flag of Athanasios Diakos	1821	Used by Athanasios Diakos and his irregulars during the Greek War of Independence.	The figure of St. George slaying the dragon, with the motto "Ελευθερία ή θάνατος" (Freedom or Death).
Flag of Andrea's Miaoulis	1821	Flag used by Andreas Miaoulis.	
Flag of Andreas Londos	1821	The first Greek revolutionary flag, raised at the beginning of the Greek War of Independence by Andreas Londos.	A black Latin cross in the center of a red field.
Flag of Alexander Ypsilantis	1821	Used by Alexander Ypsilantis.	
Flag of Anthimos Gazis	1821	Used by Anthimos Gazis and his irregulars from Thessaly during the Greek War of Independence.	
	1821	Another flag used also in Thessaly during the War of Independence, created also by Anthimos Gazis.	
Flag of Chalkidiki	1821	Flag of the revolutionaries from Chalkidiki during the Greek War of Independence.	
Flag of Thrace	1821	Flag of the revolutionaries from Thrace and Samothrace during the Greek War of Independence.	A black Greek cross on blue background
	1822	Flag of the revolutionaries from Naousa, in Macedonia during the Greek war of Independence.	Azure cross on a white field with a golden the phoenix rising from the flames. The flag bears the inscriptions: "ΕΝ ΤΟΥΤΩ ΝΙΚΑ" (In hoc signo vinces, eng: In this sign thou shalt conquer) and "ΜΑΧΟΥ ΥΠΕΡ ΠΙΣΤΕΩΣ ΚΑΙ ΠΑΤΡΙΔΟΣ" (Fight in favor of faith and fatherland) which was the title of the Declaration of the Greek Revolution by Alexander Ypsilantis.
Medieval
	1431–1500s	Flag (reconstruction) used by the Greek sipahis of the Ottoman army from the 15th to 17th century. A surviving flag exists in the Harbiye Military Museum, in Istanbul.	A blue or cyan cross over a white field with the figure of St. George slaying the dragon superimposed in the centre of the cross.
	1431–1799	The flag of Himara, an autonomous district in Epirus, during the Ottoman period.	The Archangels Michael and Gabriel depicted on a white field.
Flag of the Greek spachides	1218–1566	Flag of Republic of Genoa used in Genoese domains of Greece.	Saint George's flag, a red cross on white field.
Flag of the Greek spachides	1204–1797	Flag of the Republic of Venice from the portolan chart attributed to A. Dulcert, used in Venetian domains of Greece.	The red lion of Saint Mark on a white field.
	ca. 1445	Flag of the Byzantine Empire as depicted on the Filarete Door, showing the Byzantine Emperor's John VIII Palaiologos departure for the Council of Florence (1439) to discuss the possible reunification of the Orthodox Catholic and Western Catholic churches.	The triangular flag depicts a double headed eagle. Perhaps the flag was red adorned with a golden eagle as seen in armorial manuscripts of later centuries.
	ca. 1400	The Byzantine imperial flag as depicted in several different charts in the late 14th and early 15th century.	Golden cross on a red field with each of its quarters taken by golden Betas, also known as the tetragrammatic cross, that may represent the initials of the Palailogos family's motto King of Kings, Ruling Over Rulers (Βασιλεύς Βασιλέων, Βασιλεύων Βασιλευόντων).
Tetragrammatic cross flag	ca. 1385	Imperial banner of the Palaiologos dynasty, as recorded by Pseudo-Kodinos in the "Treatise on Offices" and one of the Byzantine flags depicted in the Castilian "Book of Knowledge of All Kingdoms" (Conosçimiento de todos los reynos). The flag is presented as the flag of "the real Greece and Empire of the Greeks (la vera Grecia e el imperio de los griegos)" but also as a flag of Salonica (Thessaloniki), Lodomago (Heraclea Perinthus) and Castelle (Sinope).	Golden cross on a red field with each of its quarters taken by golden Betas (though originally described as chain links in the Book of Knowledge of All Kingdoms and as fire steels by the native Byzantine Pseudo-Kodinos).
	ca. 1385	Flag of "Empire of Constantinople" also in the "Book of Knowledge of All Kingdoms".	A quartered flag; the first and fourth quarters are white with a red cross, the second and third are red with a golden cross, with each of its quarters taken by golden fire steels which are probably corrupted Greek Betas. The flag is a mixture of the imperial banner and the flag of the Genoese colony of Galata.
	ca. 1375	Banner with the double-headed eagle, used in various portolan charts to mark the Empire of Trebizond in the 14th century as well as in the "Book of Knowledge of All Kingdoms".	Golden double-headed eagle on a red field.
	ca. 1330	The Byzantine imperial ensign (βασιλικόν φλάμουλον) according to a depiction from the La Conquête de Constantinople of Geoffreoy de Villehardouin.	Another version of the banner with the tetragrammatic cross.
	ca. 1320	The Byzantine imperial ensign (βασιλικόν φλάμουλον) of the 14th century according to Pietro Vesconte's portolan chart.	
	ca. 1320	The flag of Salloniq (Thessaloniki) in the 14th century, also according to Pietro Vesconte's portolan chart.	
	12th century	Examples of Byzantine military banners (bandon), according to the Madrid illuminated manuscript of John Skylitzes' chronicle.	The flags shown in the manuscript vary widely in appearance and no singular pattern can be discerned, apart from a relatively restricted range of colours (red, white, and blue) used either monochromatically or in alternating bands. Their veracity is open to question, as the Madrid manuscript was painted in 12th-century Sicily, but is supposed to represent events of the 9th–11th centuries.
	10th–13th century	A Byzantine banner (φλάμουλον) (speculative) reconstruction, probably borne by cavalry. Depictions of flags with crosses quartered with golden discs from the 10th century exist, preceding the later tetragrammatic cross. A mention of a banner with a cross is mentioned in De Cerimoniis. Also, a depiction of a flag almost identical to the Palaiologian tetragrammatic ones exists from the early 13th century.	The banner depicted a Greek cross quartered with golden discs (bezants) on a red field. The flag was a square shape with pointed streamers.
	10th–12th century	Byzantine ceremonial labarum during the Macedonian, Doukid, and Komnenian dynasties according to various coins from Constantinople. On the coins of the following Byzantine emperors, the labarum was replaced by the Patriarchal cross.	

=== Other historical flags ===
Flag	Date	Use	Description
First Merchant Navy Flag	1822–1828	First flag of the Greek Merchant Navy, adopted in January 1822. In 1828 it was discontinued, as it was decided that the cross-and-stripes naval flag (today's national flag) should be flown by both military and merchant ships.	Blue flag with an inverse state flag on the canton (blue cross on white field).
Naval ensign for military vessels during the reign of King Otto	1833–1858	War ensign at sea during most of the reign of King Otto, adopted in 1833.	The flag consists of the naval version of the national flag in 25:18 proportions, with the Bavarian arms of the Wittelsbach dynasty superimposed in the center of the cross, topped by a golden royal crown superimposed in the canton. The shade of blue is undefined, but was usually of a lighter shade.
Naval ensign for military vessels during the late reign of King Otto	1858–1862	War ensign at sea during the late reign of King Otto, adopted in 1858.	The flag consists of the naval version of the national flag in 3:2 proportions, with the Bavarian arms of the Wittelsbach dynasty superimposed in the center of the cross, topped by a golden royal crown superimposed in the canton. The shade of blue is undefined, but was usually of a lighter shade.
	1914–1924	The flag of the Minister of Naval Affairs, adopted in 1914.	
Royal Flag during the Greek royal family	1936–1970	Royal version of the state flag during the Kingdom of Greece.	The flag consists of the plain cross version of the national flag, with a detailed golden royal crown superimposed in the center of the cross. The field is bordered by a gold fringe.
	1863–1924	Jack of the Royal Hellenic Navy.	A square flag with a white cross on a blue field with the Hellenic royal crown in the centre. The crown was added during the periods of monarchy (1833–1924 and 1935–1973).
	1935–1970	Jack of the Royal Hellenic Navy.	A square flag with a white cross on a blue field with the Hellenic royal crown in the centre. The crown was added during the periods of monarchy (1833–1924 and 1935–1973).
War ensign for naval vessels during the Kingdom of Greece	1863–1924	War ensign for naval vessels during the Kingdom of Greece.	The flag consists of the naval version of the national flag, with a golden royal crown superimposed in the center of the cross in the canton.
War ensign for naval vessels during the Kingdom of Greece	1935–1974	War ensign for naval vessels during the Kingdom of Greece.	The flag consists of the naval version of the national flag, with a golden royal crown superimposed in the center of the cross in the canton.
	1973	Ensign of the Royal Hellenic Air Force until 1973.	A white cross on a blue field with the roundel of the Hellenic Air Force in the centre, the royal crown in a circle on the canton.
	1973–1978	Ensign of the Hellenic Air Force (1973–1978) and Greek Civil Air Ensign, until 1978.	A white cross on a blue field with the roundel of the Hellenic Air Force in the centre.
	1919–1973	Service flag of the Hellenic Coast Guard.	The naval version of the national flag, with a golden royal crown superimposed in the centre of the cross in the canton and two silver anchors crossed in the upper hoist corner.
	1973–1980	Service flag of the Hellenic Coast Guard.	The naval version of the national flag, with two golden anchors crossed in the centre of the cross in the canton.

=== Current and historical variants used outside of Greece ===
Flag	Date	Use	Description
	Since 1964	Jack of the Cypriot Navy.	A square flag with a white cross on a blue field, with a crossed anchor, trident and cross in gold superimposed.
	Since 1950s	Unifying flag of Cyprus (Enotiki Simaia)	Used by many Greek Cypriots until today. It represents the willing of Greek Cypriots for union with Greece (Enosis).
	Since 2008	Flag of ELAM, a far-right, ultra-nationalist movement and political party in Cyprus.	The old Greek flag superimposed by a white sword on a black Boeotian shield.

== Political flags ==
Flag	Date	Party	Description
Current
	2018–present	New Democracy	
	2020–present	SYRIZA (Coalition of the Radical Left – Progressive Alliance)	
	1974–present	Communist Party of Greece	
	1940s	Communist Party of Greece	
	1974–present	PASOK (Panhellenic Socialist Movement)	
	1973–present	Flag of the Kingdom of Greece. Today used by Greek monarchists.	
Former
	1993–2020	Golden Dawn	
	1975–2002	Revolutionary Organization 17 November	
	1946–1949	Democratic Army of Greece	
	1943–1950	Organization X	
	1942–1945	ELAS	
	1936–1941	National Youth Organisation (EON)	
	1932–1943	Greek National Socialist Party	
	1927–1944	National Union of Greece	
	1922–1936	Freethinkers' Party	

== Religious flags ==
Flag	Date	Use	Description
	1980s–present	Flag of the Greek Orthodox Church and the autonomous Monastic State of the Holy Mountain (Mount Athos). Earlier versions of this flag were in use at least as far back as the early 1900s as evidenced by posters from that period.	Black double-headed eagle on a golden field.
	?–present	A widely used ahistorical "byzantine flag" of the Greek Orthodox Church, usually hoisted on churches.	The flag is a version of the tetragrammatic cross banner with the fire steels. There is the inscription "TOYTΩ NIKA" in white while the top arm of the cross is charged with the Christogram in white. In the centre of the flag there is a white double-headed eagle fimbriated red, charged upon its breast with a red shield with a cross between four fire steels, all in gold.

== Ethnic Greek subgroup flags (used unofficially) ==
Flag	Date	Use	Description
	?–present	Flag of the Cappadocian Greeks.	
	?–present	Flag of the Pontic Greeks.	
	?–present	Flag of the Sarakatsani.	

== Yacht clubs of Greece ==
Flag	Club
	Burgee of Nautical Club of Palaio Faliro

== See also ==
- List of Cypriot flags
- Flag of Greece
