= Great Greek Encyclopedia =

General knowledge Greek-language encyclopedia

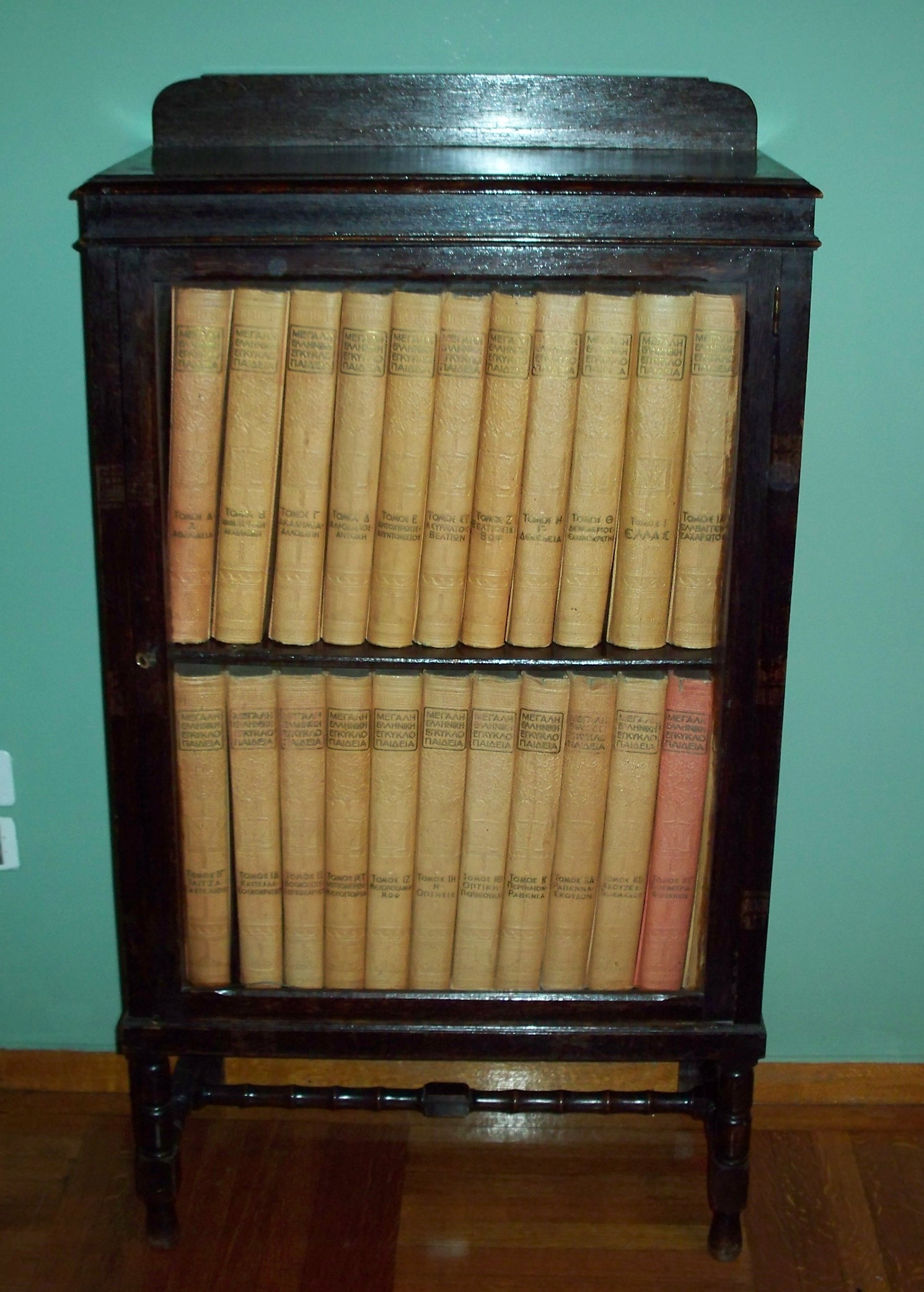
The Great Greek Encyclopedia in its purpose-built bookcase.

The Great Greek Encyclopedia (Greek: Μεγάλη Ελληνική Εγκυκλοπαίδεια, romanized: Megáli Ellinikí Enkyklopaídeia) is a general knowledge Greek-language encyclopedia, printed initially between 1926 and 1934.

The encyclopedia was founded in 1926 by Pavlos Drandakis (1896–1945) after the model of Encyclopædia Britannica. He was helped by many well-known and qualified contributors and the result was deemed to be excellent. Iraklis Apostolidis was the editor-in-chief of the encyclopedia, while approximately 700 people contributed in the writing of the encyclopedia. Pyrsos, Ltd. was commissioned with printing the encyclopedia and its printing began on March 1, 1926. It was issued approximately at the same time as another Greek encyclopedia of the time, the Eleftheroudakis Encyclopedic Dictionary. As the target group of the two encyclopedias was the same, in order to decrease the financial strain of the readers, the two encyclopedias were circulating in issues and they were even sold in installments. Pavlos Drandakis reserved some rights of the encyclopedia which he later claimed in court. After he won the trial, his descendants published a second edition of the encyclopedia in 1956 with Phoinix, Ltd.

The encyclopedia consists of 24 volumes, of which the tenth is especially dedicated to Greece. The encyclopedia contains 23,000 pages in its 24 volumes. It includes approximately 280,000 articles and 37,000 images, paintings and maps. The encyclopedia is known for the extensive use of Katharevousa. Later on, four further volumes were issued in order to update the facts written in the encyclopedia. The supplements' general title was "Supplement volume X" (with X meaning from I to IV, Α΄ to Δ΄ in Greek), increasing the volumes' sum in 28.
