= Anemi =

Anemi is a digital library that aims to provide access to a collection of digitized material related to Modern Greek Studies. Apart from finding bibliographic information, the researcher can also browse the documents themselves in electronic form. They can find a great number of old and rare documents, as well as recent publications for which their creators allowed the digitization and free distribution over the Internet.

== Collections ==
- Neoellinistis the digital library of bibliographies, dictionaries and handbooks for the Greek Modern Studies

This collection provides free access to bibliographies, dictionaries, encyclopaedias, handbooks, chronologies and other tools related with Greek Modern Studies. It also provides the users with the possibility of locating relevant alternative information where the digitization is prohibited by the Greek law. The material that it is included in Neoellinistis is organised according to the work of Politis Alexis, THE HANDBOOK OF MODERN GREEK STUDIES, Crete University Press, 2005.

- Greek Digital Bibliography 15th - 20th century

By using the digital technology, the Greek Digital Library regenerates the national bibliographic landscape of the period 1476-1900. Entries that concern it, are catalogued electronically and, where feasible, are linked with the corresponding digital item. Since December 2006, 8,000 bibliographic records are available in Anemi's data base as well as a vast amount of corresponding digitized pages.

- Anacharsis

Rare collections from the Library of University of Crete, with travel literature, have been catalogued. The bibliographical records are linked with the corresponding digital items which are hosted either in the local library or other bibliographic agents elsewhere.

- Markos Mousouros

It is a digital collection with books and archival materials about Crete. The main part of the items that are available in the collection come from the Library of the University of Crete. Among them is, the incunabulum: Etymologikon Mega, which was printed by the Cretans Zacharias Kalliergis and Nikolaos Vlastos in Venice in 1499.

== History ==
Anemi was founded in 2006 by the University of Crete Library. It embodies the final result of the Programme "Digital Library of Modern Greek Studies" which was funded by the Operational Programme "Information Society" (3rd CSF 2000-2006).
