= Konstantinos Smolenskis =

Greek military officer and politician

- Κωνσταντίνος Σμολένσκης
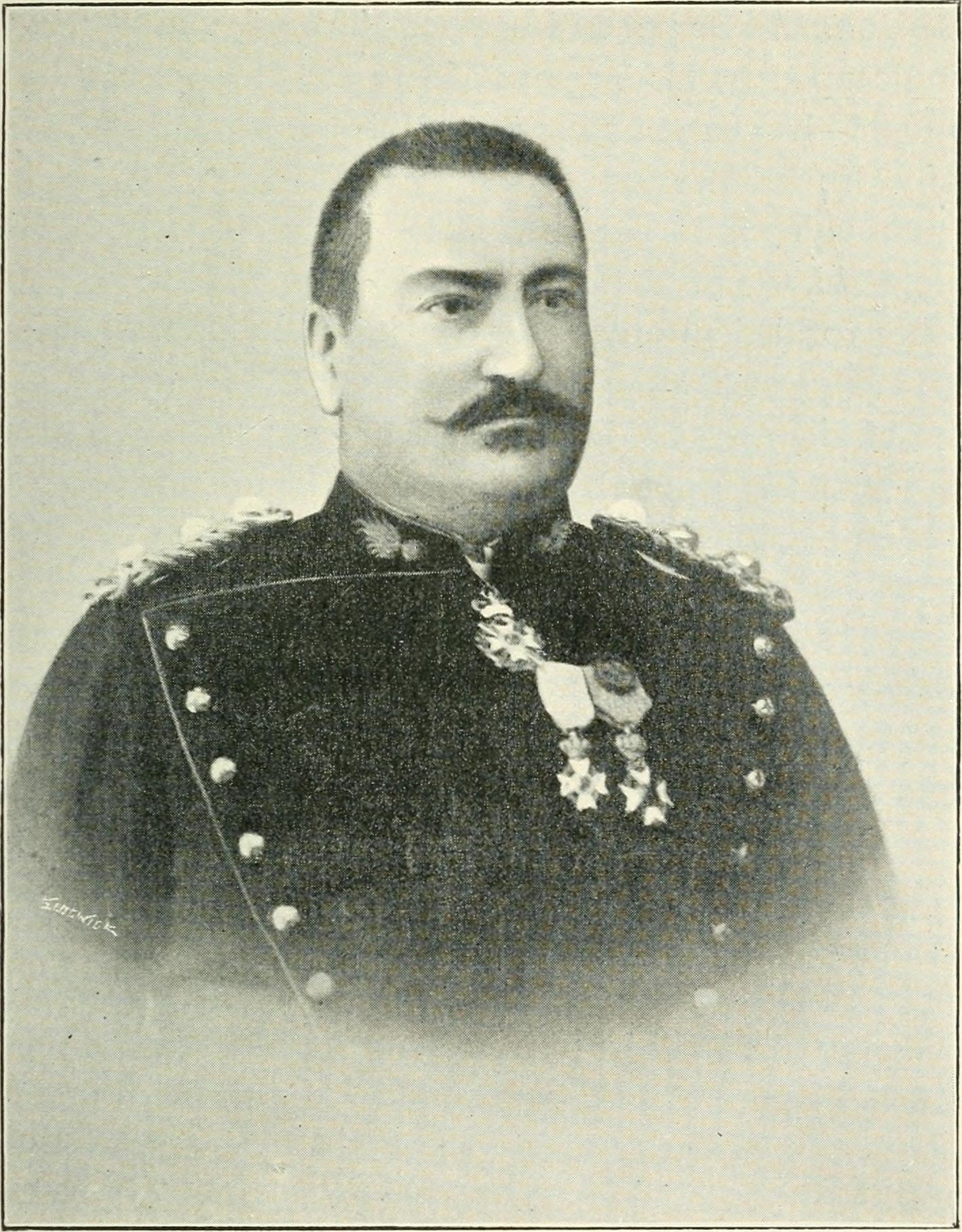
- A lithograph depicting Smolenskis and the Greco-Turkish War (1897).

Minister of Military Affairs
- In office 21 September 1897 – 30 October 1898
- Monarch: George I
- Prime Minister: Alexandros Zaimis
- Preceded by: Nikolaos Tsamados
- Succeeded by: Geogrios Korpas
- In office 6 December 1903 – 16 December 1904
- Monarch: George I
- Prime Minister: Georgios Theotokis
- Preceded by: Ioannis Konstantinidis
- Succeeded by: Kyriakoulis Mavromichalis

Member of Parliament for Attica and Boeotia
- Monarch: George I

Personal details
- Born: February 1843 Athens, Kingdom of Greece
- Died: 27 September 1915 (aged 71–72) Athens, Kingdom of Greece
- Resting place: First Cemetery of Athens
- Spouse: Charikleia Mela
- Relations: Simon von Smolik (Great-Great-Grandfather); Konstantinos Axiotis (Grandfather); Leon Melas (Father-In-Law)
- Children: Maria Smolenski (daughter); Rallou Smolenski (daughter); Sofia Smolenski (daughter)
- Parent(s): Leonidas Smolents; Maria Axiotis
- Education: Hellenic Military Academy (expelled); Belgian Royal Military Academy
- Awards: Grand Commander of the Order of the Redeemer

Military service
- Allegiance: Kingdom of Greece
- Branch/service: Hellenic Army
- Years of service: 1862-1912
- Rank: Lieutenant General
- Battles/wars: Cretan Revolt (1866–1869); Greco-Turkish War (1897); Battle of Velestino; Battle of Domokos

Konstantinos Smolenskis or Smolents (Greek: Κωνσταντίνος Σμολένσκης/Σμόλεντς, 1843–1915) was a Hellenic Army officer. Descendant of a family that had settled in the Habsburg monarchy and returned to Greece after the Greek War of Independence, early in his career he was distinguished as a well-educated and capable officer. He particularly distinguished himself in the Greco-Turkish War of 1897, where he led the Greek defenders at the Battle of Velestino. This rendered him a national hero and earned him widespread popularity; he was twice elected Member of the Hellenic Parliament, and served twice as Minister for Military Affairs.

== Origin and family ==
Konstantinos Smolenskis was born in 1843 in Athens. His family was of Greek–Aromanian descent from Moscopole, where they had been landowners and tax officials before moving to the Habsburg monarchy. There they received the surname "Smolenc" or "Smolenic", derived from Mount Smolikas. The family settled in Hungary. The first important member, Simon Smolenic, became a wealthy merchant and was ennobled by Francis II of the Holy Roman Empire in 1797 as an Imperial Knight with the surname "von Smolik". Konstantinos' father was Leonidas Smolents, a great-grandson of Simon who had tried to come to Greece as a volunteer during the Greek War of Independence, and joined the nascent Greek Army in 1830. Leonidas Smolents reached the rank of major general and served several times as Minister for Military Affairs.

Konstantinos' mother was Maria Axioti, daughter of a distinguished military officer and politician Konstantinos Axiotis, after whom Smolenskis was named. The couple had two sons: Konstantinos and the older Nikolaos Smolenits, who also became an army officer and general.

Konstantinos, who Hellenized his surname to Smolenskis, married on 22 November 1875 Charikleia Mela, daughter of the author Leon Melas and aunt of the later hero of the Macedonian Struggle, Pavlos Melas. They had five daughters, of whom only three survived infancy: Maria, Rallou, and Sofia. After the death of her mother, Rallou committed suicide at the age of 20.

== Career ==
After finishing his school studies, Smolenskis enrolled in the Hellenic Army Academy in 1857, but had to interrupt his studies due to his unruly behaviour: he was reported as repeatedly striking his fellow students during arguments with them. His own father, who was Minister for Military Affairs at the time, signed the decree expelling him from the academy. Instead, Smolenskis enrolled in the Brussels Military Academy in 1860, from where he graduated in 1862. Returning to Greece he was commissioned into the Hellenic Army as an artillery warrant officer on 5 December 1863.

On 5 May 1864, he was promoted to second lieutenant. He took part in the Cretan revolution of 1866–1869 as the commander of a company of Philhellenes, taking part with some distinction in battles at Kastelli, Kissamos, Tylissos, Gerakari, Ambelakia, and Mylopotamos. On 7 September 1868 he was promoted to lieutenant. After the suppression of the Cretan uprising, the ability he had shown led to him being sent to pursue further studies in Germany and France. He witnessed the Franco-Prussian War of 1870–1871 from Paris, before returning to Greece in 1871.

His qualifications and studies earmarked him for senior staff and command appointments. In 1876 he published a manual for new officers. By 1877, he was a captain. In 1881, following the annexation of Thessaly and the Arta Prefecture, Smolenskis served in the commission for the drawing of the new Greek–Ottoman border. On 16 July 1881 he was promoted to major. In 1885–86, he led the fortification program in the new provinces, and received the Gold Cross of the Order of the Redeemer for his service. This was followed later by Belgian and Serbian decorations.

He then was appointed professor of fortifications in the Army Academy, a post which he held for several years. Promoted by special selection to lieutenant colonel on 19 September 1888, he served as prosecutor and president of the 1st Permanent Military Tribunal. As lieutenant colonel, he also served in the artillery's technical advisory board and commandant of the artillery fire school. On 26 May 1895 he was promoted to full colonel, and in 1896 assumed command of the 3rd Artillery Regiment.

=== Greco-Turkish War of 1897 ===
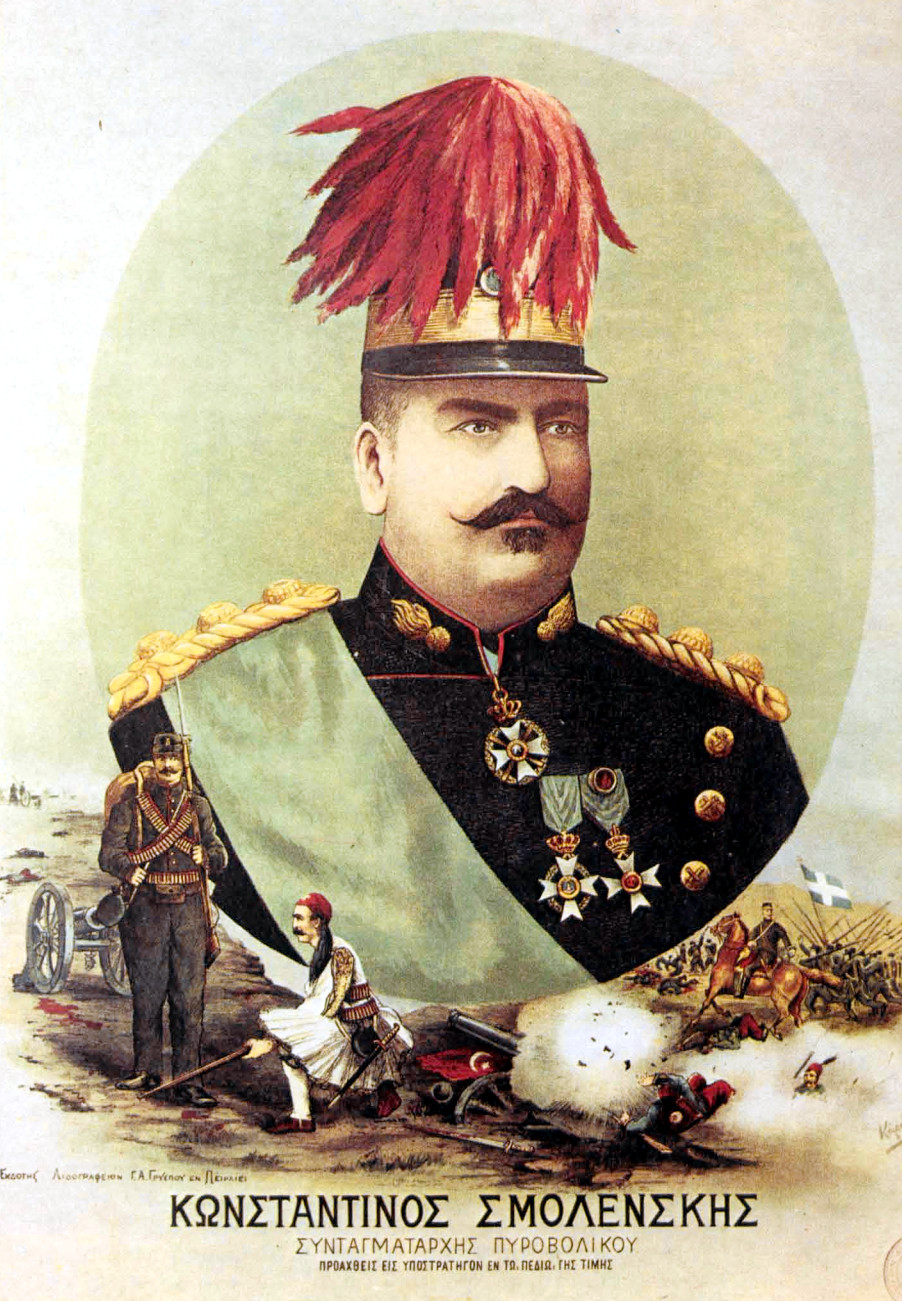
A lithograph depicting Smolenskis and the Greco-Turkish War (1897).

At the outbreak of the Greco-Turkish War of 1897, he was appointed to command the 3rd Brigade, comprising the 7th and 8th infantry regiments, the 6th, 8th, and 9th Evzone Battalions, along with two companies each of engineers, artillery, and cavalry. During the initial frontier battles, Smolenskis held back the Turkish attacks at Reveni for six days (6–12 April), before being forced to retreat due to the defeat of the Greek army in the other frontier sectors. Following the main army's retreat to Farsala, he was briefly nominated as chief of staff to the Army of Thessaly, but instead dispatched with his brigade to cover the approaches to Volos by occupying the pass of Velestino. There he fought the Battle of Velestino on 15–24 April, before retreating to Almyros.

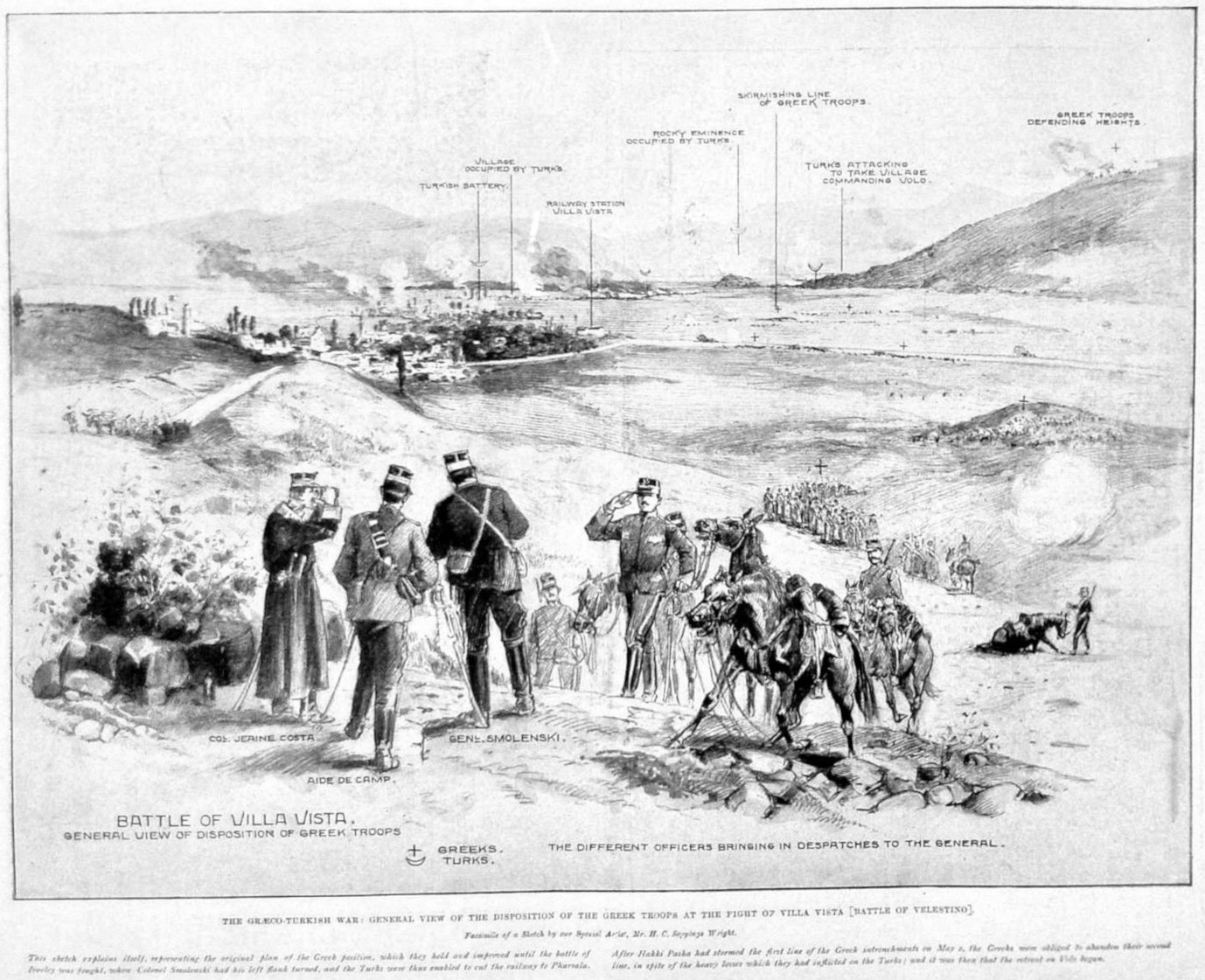
Smolenskis with his staff observing the Battle of Velestino from the hills south of the namesake village.

His conduct in this disastrous war, and especially his successful defence at Velestino, sharply contrasted with the general ineffectiveness of the rest of the military and political leadership. Lionized by the press, he became a national hero and won some international renown. Smolenskis received a field promotion to major general on 7 May 1897, and was placed in command of the 1st Infantry Division. The government decorated him with the Grand Commander of the Order of the Redeemer, and he enjoyed widespread popularity, in marked contrast to the hostility shown to him by palace circles. Already in 1897, the Municipality of Athens gave his name to a street, and he received honorary citizenships from several Greek cities. Medals and lithographs with his portrait were in widespread demand and prominently displayed for several years thereafter.

=== Post-war career ===
This popularity allowed him to launch a political career: Smolenskis was twice elected Member of the Hellenic Parliament for the Attica and Boeotia Prefecture, and he served twice as Minister for Military Affairs, in the 1897 Alexandros Zaimis cabinet, and in the 1903 Georgios Theotokis cabinet. During this time, he was given the chairmanship of the Revisionary Military Tribunal, and legislation was passed to make him commander-in-chief in case of war.

He retired on 27 March 1912 with the rank of lieutenant general, and died on 27 September 1915.

== Sources ==
- Evangelidis, Tryfon E. (1898). "Κωνσταντίνος Σμολένσκης: Βιογραφικόν Δοκίμιον" [Konstantinos Smolenskis: Biographical Essay]. Κων. Φ. Σκοκου Ετησιον Ημερολογιον Χρονογραφικον, Φιλολογικον Και Γελοιογραφικον Του Ετους 1898 (in Greek). Athens: 81–87. Archived from the original on 20 July 2019.
- Pontikas, Apostolos (2014). "Κων. Σμολένσκη, ο θρύλος του Eλληνοτουρκικού πολέμου του 1897 και ήρωας της Μάχης του Βελεστίνου" [Kon. Smolenski, the legend of the Greco-Turkish War of 1897 and hero of the Battle of Velestino]. In Karamberopoulos, Dimitrios A. (ed.). Υπέρεια, Τόμος Έκτος. Πρακτικά Στ′ Διεθνούς Συνεδρίου "Φεραί-Βελεστίνο-Ρήγας", Βελεστίνο, 4-7 Οκτωβρίου 2012. Μέρος Α′, Φεραί-Βελεστίνο (PDF) (in Greek). Athens: Scientific Society of Studies on Pherae-Velestino-Rigas. pp. 613–622. ISBN 978-960-6733-17-8.
- Talantis, Efthymios (2014). "Η Μάχη του Βελεστίνου μέσα από τις στήλες της ημερησίας αθηναϊκής εφημερίδας ΕΜΠΡΟΣ" [The Battle of Velestino in the columns of the daily Athenian newspaper EMPROS]. In Karamberopoulos, Dimitrios A. (ed.). Υπέρεια, Τόμος Έκτος. Πρακτικά Στ′ Διεθνούς Συνεδρίου "Φεραί-Βελεστίνο-Ρήγας", Βελεστίνο, 4-7 Οκτωβρίου 2012. Μέρος Α′, Φεραί-Βελεστίνο (PDF) (in Greek). Athens: Scientific Society of Studies on Pherae-Velestino-Rigas. pp. 629–654. ISBN 978-960-6733-17-8.

Political offices
Preceded by Nikolaos Tsamados	Minister for Military Affairs; 21 September 1897 – 30 October 1898	Succeeded by Georgios Korpas
Preceded by Ioannis Konstantinidis	Minister for Military Affairs; 6 December 1903 – 16 December 1904	Succeeded by Kyriakoulis Mavromichalis
