= Erel (name) =

Arel, Erel, or Erell (Hebrew: אראל) can be both a masculine given name and a surname. Notable people with the name include:

== Israeli ==
=== Given name ===
- Erel Halevi (born 1991), Israeli swimmer
- Erel Margalit, Israeli venture capitalist
- Erel Segal, Israeli journalist

=== Surname ===
- Gal Arel (born 1989), Israeli former football defensive midfielder and central defender
- Shlomo Erell (1920–2018), Israeli major general
- Tal Erel (born 1996), Israeli baseball catcher

== Turkish ==
- Bülent Arel (1919–1990), Turkish composer
- Maide Arel (1907–1997), Turkish-Armenian painter
- Ayhan Erel, Turkish parliamentarian
- Hakkı Şinasi Erel (1871–1941), Turkish politician
- Korhan Erel (born 1973), Turkish-German musician
- Yankı Erel (born 2000), Turkish tennis player

== Others ==
- Jeremy Arel, American practitioner of Brazilian Jiu Jitsu
- Kadek Arel (born 2005), Indonesian football centre-back
- Roger Erell (1907–1986), French architect
