= Battle of Velestino =

Two battles during the Greco-Ottoman War of 1897

- Part of the Greco-Turkish War of 1897
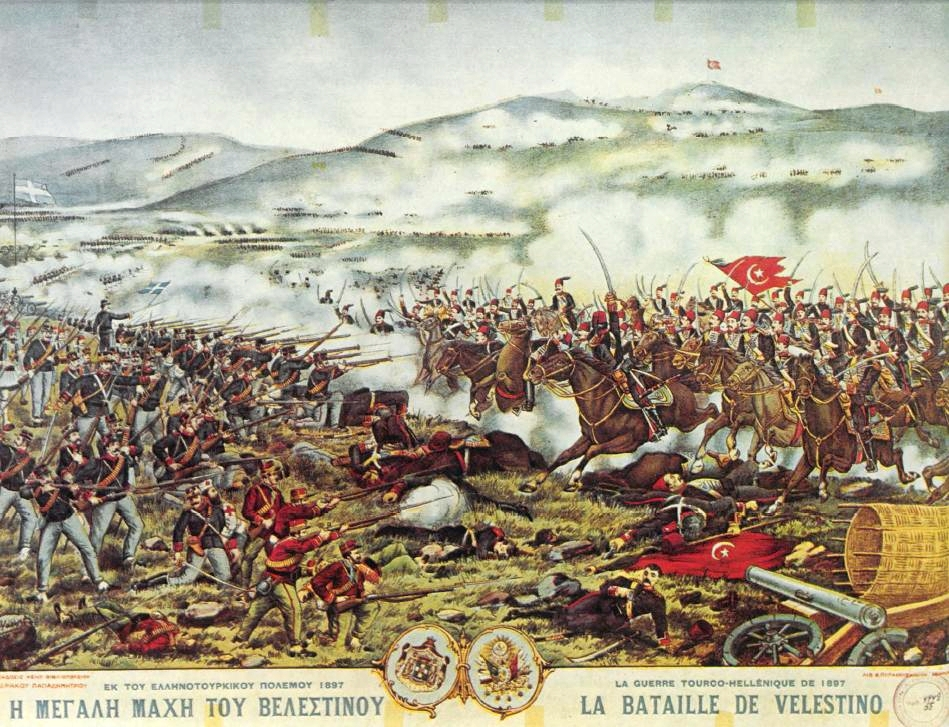
- Greek lithograph with an imagined depiction of the attacks of the Ottoman cavalry on the Greek infantry lines
Date	1st Battle: 27–30 April 1897; 2nd Battle: 5–6 May 1897
Location	Velestino, Thessaly, Greece 39°22.9′N 22°44.7′E
Result	1st Battle: Greek victory 2nd Battle: Ottoman victory

Belligerents
Ottoman Empire	(Kingdom of Greece) Greece

Commanders and leaders
1st Battle Edhem Pasha; Naim Pasha; Mahmud Muhtar 2nd Battle Hakki Pasha	Konstantinos Smolenskis

Strength
1st Battle 1 infantry regiment, 12 cavalry companies, 1 artillery battery 2nd Battle 17 battalions, 4 cavalry companies, 4 artillery batteries	1st Battle 6.5 (later 7.5) infantry battalions, 2 (later 3) artillery batteries 2nd Battle 11 battalions, 4 cavalry companies, 3 artillery batteries

Casualties and losses
1st Battle 138 killed, 254 wounded 2nd Battle 59 killed, 361 wounded	1st Battle 28 killed, 142 wounded 2nd Battle 73 killed, 306 wounded
- Location within Greece

The Battle of Velestino (Greek: Μάχη του Βελεστίνου, Turkish: Velestin Muharebesi) comprised two separate engagements, which took place on 27 April [O.S. 15 April] 1897–30 April [O.S. 18 April] 1897 and 5 May [O.S. 23 April] 1897–6 May [O.S. 24 April] 1897, between the Greek and Ottoman armies at Velestino in Thessaly, as part of the Greco-Turkish War of 1897.

The pass of Velestino controlled the road and railway lines linking the port city of Volos with the interior of the Thessalian plain. As the Greek army withdrew from Larissa to Farsala, a reinforced brigade under Colonel Konstantinos Smolenskis was sent to occupy the pass and cover Volos and the right of the new Greek position. At the same time, the Ottoman high command dispatched a mixed force of cavalry and infantry in the same direction to capture Volos. The first Greek detachments arrived in the area in the morning of 27 April, some hours ahead of the Ottomans, and occupied the heights around Velestino. As a result, a first clash developed in the same evening as the first Ottoman forces arrived in the area. The Ottomans were repelled and retreated to Kileler, while the bulk of Smolenskis' command arrived during the night and took up defensive positions on the next day, while the Ottomans remained inactive.

The Ottoman forces resumed their attack on 29 April, chiefly through the arrival of Colonel Mahmud Muhtar as the representative of the Ottoman commander-in-chief Edhem Pasha. The Ottoman forces advanced up to the Greek positions planning to concentrate their attack on the Greek right, but in the event the advance of the Ottoman left under Naim Pasha was delayed, while on the Ottoman right, Mahmud Muhtar launched attacks on the Greek left. As a result, the Ottoman commanders altered their plans to focus on the Greek left, planning to outflank the Greek positions on the next day. However, both the outflanking manoeuvre as well as frontal infantry attacks and an attempt to penetrate the Greek lines with a massed cavalry charge failed on 30 April, both due to Greek resistance and poor coordination among the Ottoman units. As a result, the Ottomans broke off their attack and withdrew. Edhem Pasha retired the cavalry from the battle to recuperate, and replaced it with the 5th Infantry Division. The First Battle of Velestino was thus a Greek victory; the only major battlefield success for the Greek army during the war, which propelled Smolenskis to the status of a national hero.

The Second Battle of Velestino began on 5 May, to coincide with the Battle of Farsala between the main body of the Ottoman army and the bulk of the Greek forces. Once again the Ottomans attempted to turn the Greek left flank, but the active Greek resistance thwarted them. On the next day, however, the Ottoman attack in the same area was more successful, as this time the Greeks were unable to bring in sufficient reinforcements to counter the outflanking manoeuvre. The Ottoman success forced the Greek left back, obliging Colonel Smolenskis to order a retreat. As the Ottomans did not exploit their success, the Greek forces were able to withdraw unmolested to Almyros, where they remained until the main Greek army was defeated at the Battle of Domokos.

== Background ==
Following the Greek defeats in the battles of the frontier, the Greek forces of the Army of Thessaly were forced to withdraw to Larissa, but a panic broke out and the withdrawal degenerated into chaos during the night of 11/12 April. This forced the Greek commander-in-chief, Crown Prince Constantine, to abandon any idea of defending the line of the Pineios River, and withdraw further to Farsala. The Greek withdrawal was disorderly, leaving behind large quantities of material. Ottomans followed hesitantly, losing the chance to destroy the Greek army or capture the port city of Volos. This gave the Greeks time to regroup and organize a defensive position at Farsala, and also send forces from there to cover the approaches to Volos at Velestino.

Velestino is a small town located in southwestern Thessaly. Its strategic significance lies in its geographic position in a pass between the Chalkodonion–Karadagh Mountains (the ancient Cynoscephalae Hills) to the west and a western spur of Mount Pelion on the east, through which the road and railway line linking the Pagasetic Gulf and the port of Volos to the inland Thessalian plain and Larissa. The railway line from Volos also branched off to Farsala, and was thus vital for the supply of the Greek army at Farsala by sea, since the overland route via Lamia was difficult due to the lack of transport means.

== First Battle of Velestino ==
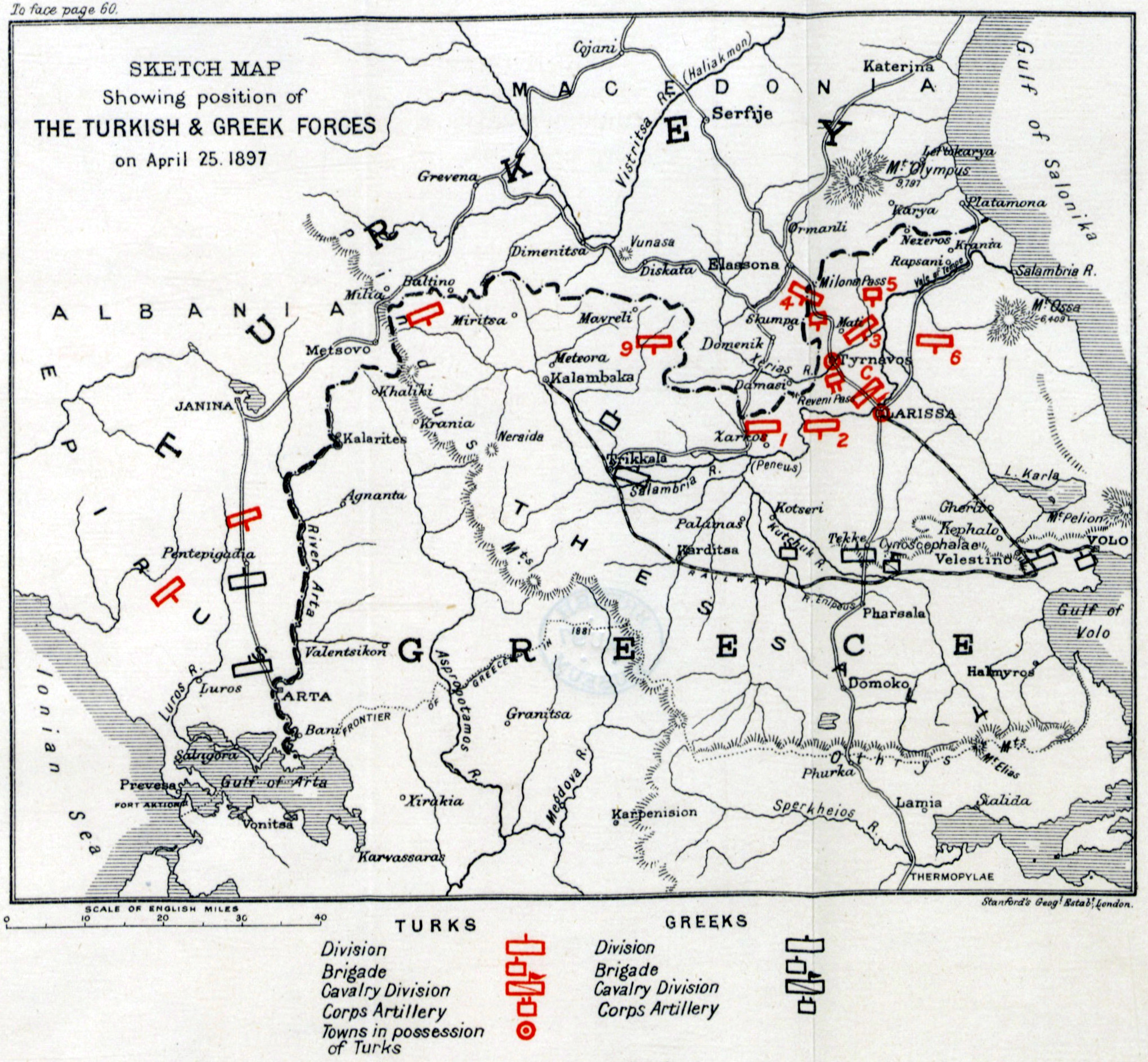
Dispositions of the Greek and Ottoman armies on 25 April 1897

=== 27 April ===
On 26 April, a "Mixed Brigade" was established to occupy the Velestino position. It was formed around the 3rd Brigade (7th and 8th Infantry Regiments) commanded by Colonel Konstantinos Smolenskis, with the addition of the 6th Evzone Battalion, a mountain artillery battalion, an engineer company from the 2nd Engineer Battalion, and a cavalry company. Two days later, a field artillery battery from the 2nd Artillery Regiment was added to it. Due to shortage of rail carriages, most of this force moved from Farsala to Velestino on foot. Only the Evzone Battalion, an engineer company, and an infantry company of the 7th Regiment's III Battalion (III/7) were sent by rail, arriving at Velestino at 11:00 on 27 April. There they established a defensive position around the Velestino railway station, and deployed a company to cover concealed forces in the forest to the east, near the fork of railway line from Larissa to Volos and Farsala. The artillery and cavalry arrived next, around 15:00, with the rest of the troops following behind on foot. Only towards the end of the day were trains found to carry the 8th Regiment's III Battalion (III/8), an infantry company, and Colonel Smolenskis himself to the area.

On the Ottoman side, the commander-in-chief, Edhem Pasha, dispatched a mixed force to capture Volos, as the Ottomans had received information that the latter city was held by only 200 men. The force, under Suleiman Pasha, was composed of the 13th and 14th Cavalry Regiments plus three companies of the 6th Imperial Horse Guards Regiment (12 companies in total), a horse artillery battery, and the 3rd Bursa Regiment of the 5th Infantry Division. Setting out from Larissa at 10:00 on 27 April, they moved via Gherli (modern Armenio) and its cavalry vanguard reached the area of Velestino at 17:30 on 27 April, when they crossed the bridge of Rizomylos.

The Greek forces at Velestino, themselves having arrived hours before, only became aware of the Ottoman approach at 17:00. Immediately the 6th Evzone Battalion, along with the other units on site, deployed its forces: two companies moved to the direction of the Ottoman advance, two others moved to occupy the height of Velestino and Ovrias Gala, and another company covered the artillery, which took position around the railway station. The two cavalry squadrons were ordered to launch a spoiling attack against the Ottoman advance. At 17:30, as the Ottomans were crossing the Rizomylos bridge and their leading cavalry company was approaching Velestino, the Evzones opened fire.

Unaware of the size of the opposing forces, Suleiman Pasha decided to break through in force, and sent three cavalry companies to capture the railway station. Faced with stiff resistance, Suleiman Pasha now employed his own artillery about one kilometre north of the Rizomylos bridge, and deployed his entire division: three companies were to continue the attack on the railway station, while the other seven were to advance towards Volos. Each of the two groups was divided into three echelons, the first in open order and the second and third in close-order formation. The firefight continued until 18:30, when the Greek forces launched a counterattack in the direction of the Rizomylos bridge. With their backs to the Rizomylos stream, (Note: The stream was dry, but represented a considerable obstacle to mounted troops, being about three metres wide and deep, and with steep banks.) Suleiman Pasha's forces were in danger of being cut off if the bridge were captured. Mistakenly estimating the Greek forces at much larger than they actually were, the Ottoman commander ordered a retreat, first to Gherli and then, along with the Bursa Regiment, to Kileler.

Despite the Ottoman withdrawal, rumours spread in the Greek rear that the heights around Velestino had been captured, and that the Greek forces were about to be encircled. This led to cases of panic, sporadic wild shots and desertions. The entire artillery battalion withdrew to Volos, followed by two cavalry platoons, and a few Evzones and infantrymen. The 2nd Company of the 2nd Cavalry Regiment took flight towards Almyros, spreading panic; the field hospitals also fled to Volos, while the peasant carters hired to carry supplies for the troops simply abandoned their carts and fled. When Smolenskis arrived at the nearby village of Aerino after nightfall, the local railway station staff informed him of the rumours that Velestino had been captured by the Ottomans. He nevertheless pushed on foot towards Velestino with the bulk of his brigade, which had begun arriving; but being unaware of the terrain, and due to the late hour, after making contact with the units of the 8th Regiment, both he and his men spent the night on the heights to the southwest of Velestino. On the next morning, Smolenskis busied himself with deploying his troops in a defensive position, and trying to restore discipline and morale. His requests to the Greek headquarters to be allowed to shoot deserters on the spot were denied, but his arrival did calm nerves and restore order in the Greek units.

=== 28 April ===
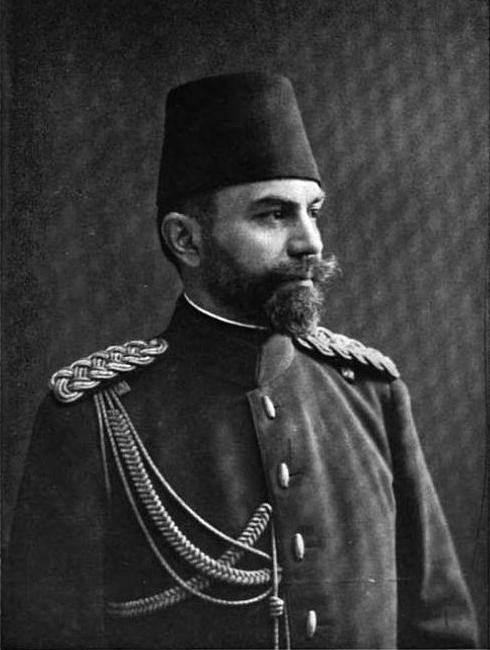
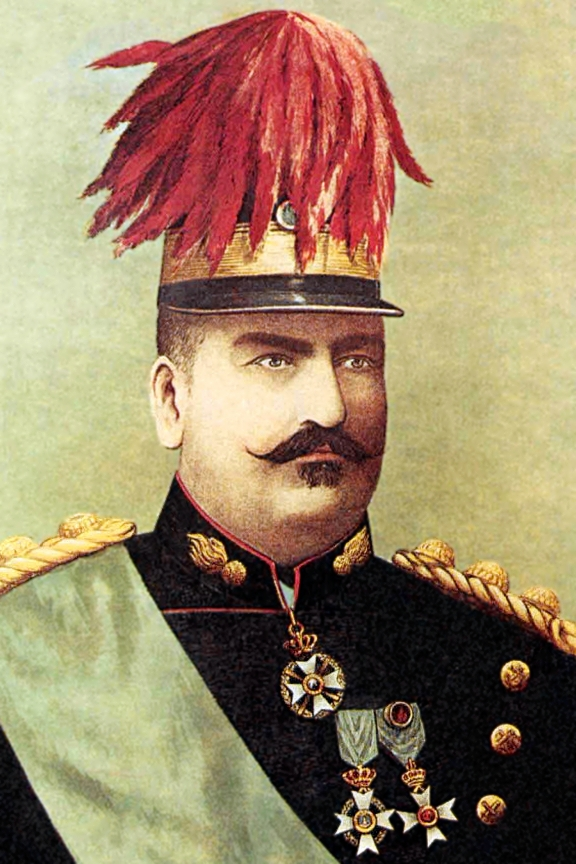
The protagonists of the First Battle of Velestino: Colonel Mahmud Muhtar (left), photographed as a general in 1916, and Colonel Konstantinos Smolenskis (right) in a contemporary Greek lithograph

The Ottoman commander-in-chief Edhem Pasha dispatched one of the 5th Division's brigade commanders, Naim Pasha, to take over command of the operation, and sent another infantry regiment and a mountain artillery battery as well. Arriving at Kileler around noon on the 28th, Naim Pasha sent two cavalry companies towards Velestino on reconnaissance at 13:30, while half an hour later his main force, comprising his entire infantry brigade and Suleiman Pasha's cavalry division, followed suit, encamping at Gherli. Apart from reconnaissance activity and torching the village of Rizomylos, the Ottoman forces remained quiet that day.

The cavalry detachments returned in the evening, reporting that the pass was held by a few Greek battalions and artillery. In the meantime, however, Edhem Pasha had become worried at the inactivity of Naim Pasha, and in the early hours of the 29th sent one of his staff officers, Cavalry Colonel Mahmud Muhtar, to examine the situation on the ground and take any necessary measures.

=== 29 April ===
After his arrival at Gherli around noon on 29 April, Mahmud Muhtar urged Naim Pasha and Suleiman Pasha to attack before the Greeks had had enough time to establish strong fortifications; he also pointed out that the rest of the Ottoman army was at the very same time preparing to advance on Farsala, and that the Greek forces opposing them were not as strong as they thought.The energetic Mahmud Muhtar would prove to be the driving force of the Ottoman efforts to break through the Velestino position, but the Ottomans remained hampered by the lack of unified command: Naim Pasha, who outranked Mahmud Muhtar, disregarded his advice and proved himself a dilatory and hesitant commander.

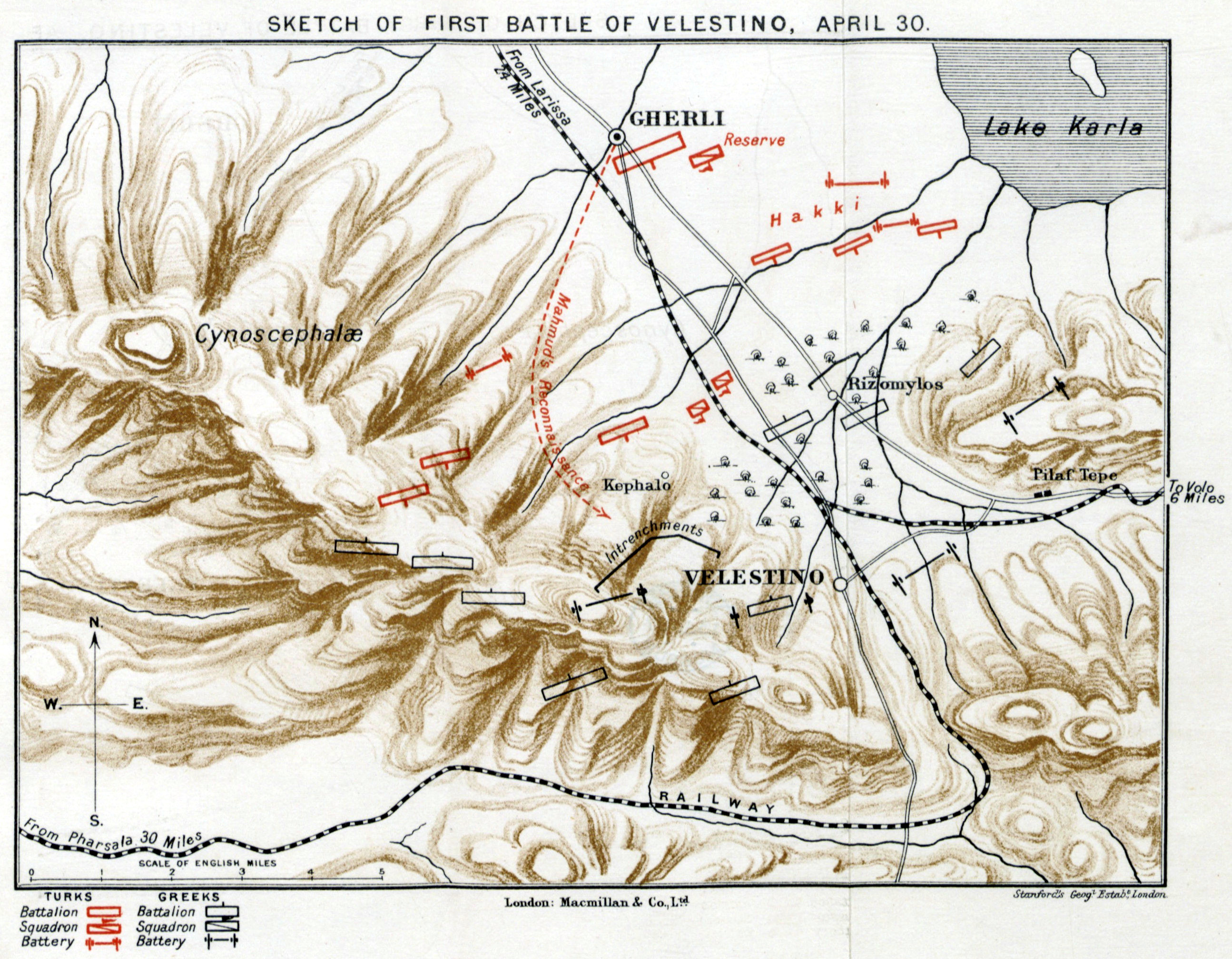
Sketch of the Ottoman and Greek positions prior to the Ottoman attack on 30 April

The Ottoman commanders worked out a plan of attack in two columns. Suleiman Pasha was put in charge of the right (western) column, although Colonel Mahmud Muhtar, who joined the column ostensibly as the commander-in-chief's liaison, was its de facto commander. It comprised the Bursa, Orhaneli, and Bilecik infantry battalions, a horse artillery battery, and 7 cavalry companies (three from the 6th Guards Regiment and the 13th Cavalry Regiment), and was intended to operate as a diversion, while the main attack would be led by Naim Pasha on the left (eastern) flank along the road to Volos, against the Greek centre and right. Naim Pasha's column comprised the Adapazarı, Elmalı, Çakırca, and Tuzca battalions and two companies from the Mihaliç battalion, the 14th Cavalry Regiment, and a field artillery battery.

On the Greek side, the forces under Smolenskis' command on 29 April numbered 6 infantry companies on the feet of Malouka Hill, to the west of Velestino, with an artillery battery on the Panagia height. A battalion occupied the low ground before the pass itself, between the Velestino railway station and the height of Ovrias Gala to the northeast, near Rizomylos. The 6th Evzone Battalion held the Ovrias Gala height itself. Another infantry battalion, with an artillery battery, was placed at the Pilaf Tepe height. Two battalions (minus a company sent to Volos) remained at Velestino as a reserve. The Greek troops had dug trenches and field works before their positions.

The Ottomans began their march at 14:00, and were detected by the Greek scouts an hour later, as the Ottoman vanguard detachments approached the village of Koniari (modern Chloi) in front of the Greek left. At around 16:00, Suleiman Pasha's troops occupied the heights around Koniari, and started firing on the Greek positions. After about half an hour, Mahmud Muhtar had gauged the Greek strength, which he estimated at 3–4 battalions with a few mountain artillery pieces, and, given the numerical superiority of the Ottoman forces, decided to launch an all-out attack. However, before giving this order, he had to coordinate with Naim Pasha's column, and set out to meet with him at Rizomylos, only to find that the latter's column had moved slowly and not yet reached its planned positions. Only at around 17:00 did the leading elements of Naim Pasha's column arrive at Rizomylos, with the main body following half an hour behind. Naim Pasha launched an attack against the Greek positions at Ovrias Gala at 18:00, but was repulsed, and nightfall halted any further operations.

According to Colmar von der Goltz, Mahmud Muhtar suggested a night attack against the Greek left at 03:00, but again this did not take place because the additional battalion promised by Naim Pasha for this operation failed to arrive on time. With the shift of troops and focus to their right, the Ottomans effectively reversed their original plan and made their main effort against the Greek left.

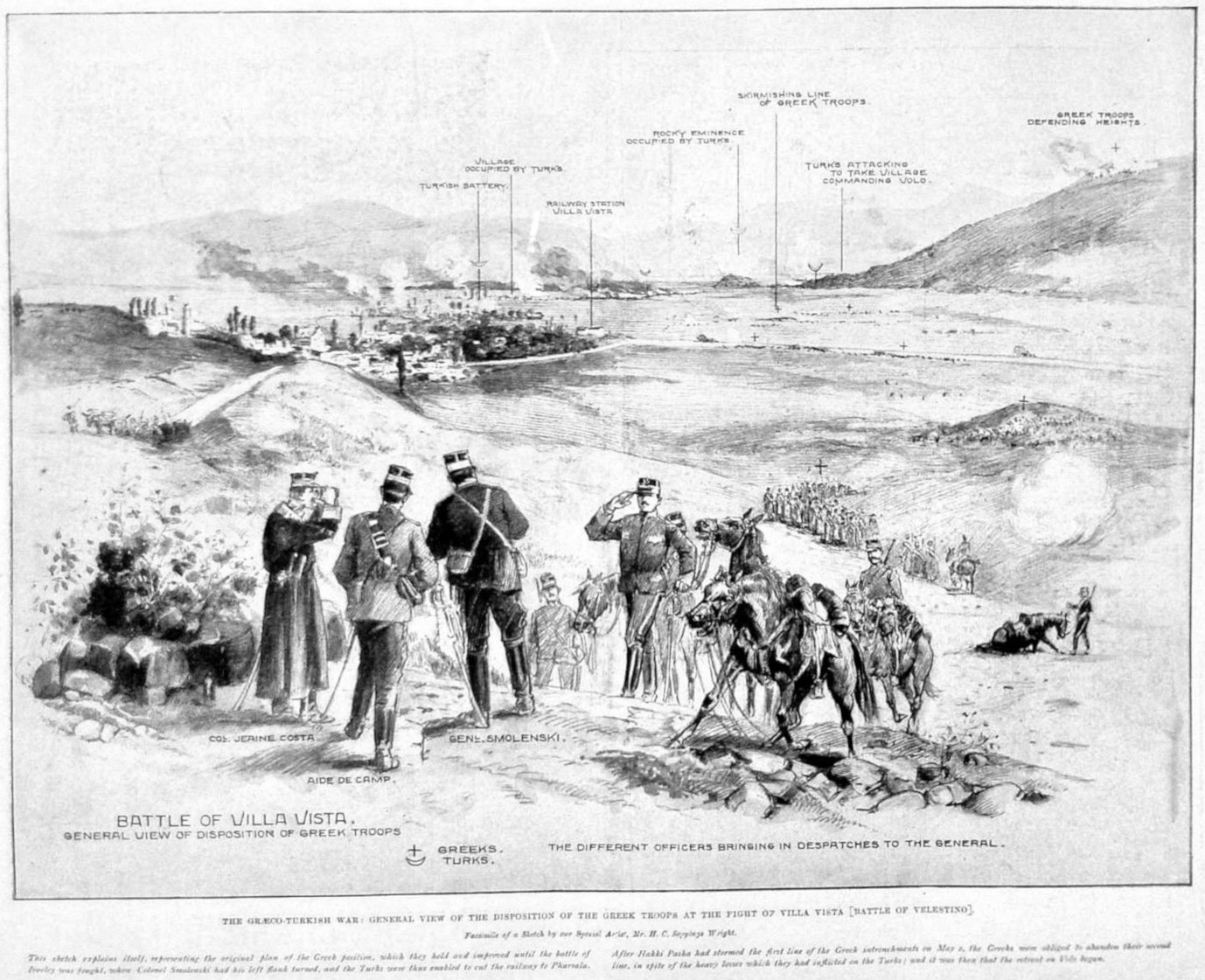
View of the battle from the Greek command post on the hills south of Velestino

On the Greek side, Colonel Smolenskis asked Crown Prince Constantine for urgent reinforcements, and in the same night received by rail the 4/2 field artillery battery, which took up position near the railway station, and the 4th Evzone Battalion, which took up positions at Ayvali (modern Rigaion) to cover Smolenskis' left flank. As a result, by the next morning, the heights of Malouka Hill on the Greek left were defended by the equivalent of two full battalions (III/7 Battalion minus two companies, IV/8 Battalion, two companies of 8th Regiment) and two mountain batteries (12 guns), while the positions on the low ground between the railway station and the Ovrias Gala height also strengthened to six companies (II/7 Battalion and two companies from 8th Regiment), leaving 7 companies of 8th Regiment as a reserve. On the right, Ovrias Gala was held by six companies: the 6th Evzone Battalion, minus a company detached to cover the village of Kapourna (modern Glafyra), along with a company from III/7 Battalion. The engineer company was placed on the Latomi heights east of the Velestino railway station, while the last company of III/7 Battalion had been detached to maintain order in Volos.

=== 30 April ===
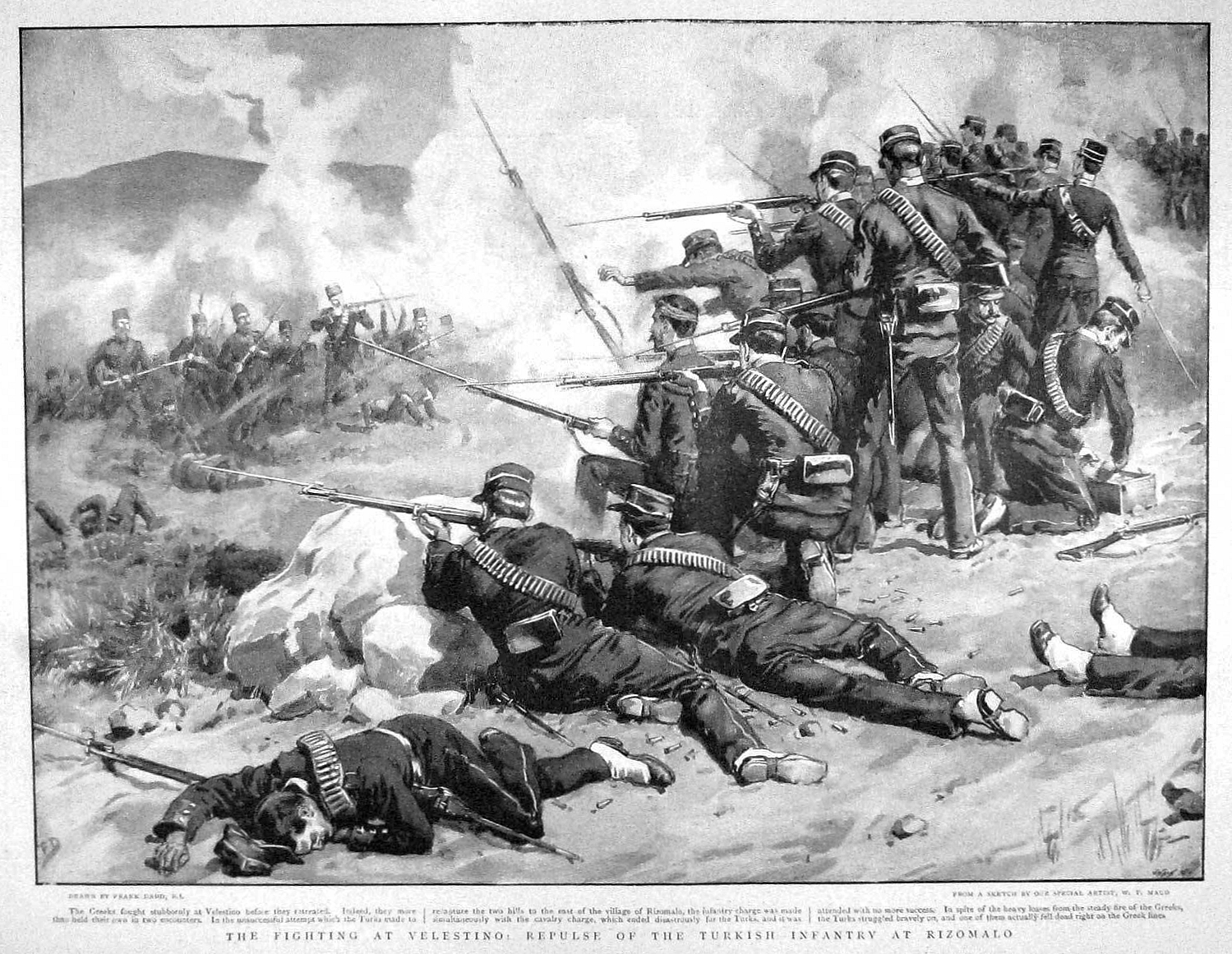
Sketch of the firefight between the Ottoman and Greek infantry at Rizomylos

The Ottoman attack began at dawn (5:00) on the 30th, with Naim Pasha's column attacking the Ovrias Gala and Pilaf Tepe heights, with support from a battery at Rizomylos. The attacking Ottoman forces, however, were repulsed both at Ovrias Gala and in front of Velestino. The Greeks were aided by the recently arrived field battery, which took position near the railway station at 9:00.

At Ovrias Gala, the commander of the Greek II/7 Battalion, Major Kopsidas, launched a counterattack with two companies against the Ottoman reserves, throwing them into panic and dispersing them, until an Ottoman battalion and cavalry company came to their rescue, and attacked the Greeks' left. Eventually, the Greek column withdrew back to its trenches before the railway station around noon. The Ottomans then launched an attack on the Megavouni height with a battalion, but the attack was repulsed by 17:00. Likewise, in the centre, the repeated attempts of the Adapazarı battalion and the two companies from the Mihaliç battalion to evict the Greek defenders from the forest north of Velestino, failed. At 11:30 a Greek company attempted to launch a counterattack but was likewise repulsed.

On the Ottoman right, Mahmud Muhtar left the Bursa battalion with the horse artillery battery to pin down the Greek left, while personally leading six infantry companies from the Orhaneli and Bilecik battalions on a wide outflanking manoeuvre around Mount Karadagh to the rear of the Greek left's positions. Two infantry companies of the Bilecik battalion and seven cavalry companies were kept as a reserve to exploit any success.

By noon, Mahmud Muhtar's manoeuvring element still had not made sufficient progress, hampered by the hard terrain, and thwarted by the reaction of the III/7 Battalion commander, Major Nikolaos Demestichas, who progressively sent out companies to extend the Greek left flank to the west and occupy crucial heights before the Turks arrived. At the same time, on the Ottoman left, Naim Pasha grew increasingly anxious about the situation of his forces, which were engaged already for seven hours without success, and pleaded with his fellow commanders to apply more pressure on their own front. The bad situation on Naim Pasha's front was exacerbated by the inept disposition of his forces: contrary to the advice of Mahmud Muhtar, he had strung out his entire force on an 8 kilometres (5.0 mi) wide front, without keeping any reserves. As a result, Mahmud Muhtar and Suleiman Pasha decided to launch a frontal attack against the Greek left at Karadagh with the infantry they had held in reserve, and the seven cavalry companies, 300 men under Ibrahim Bey, were instructed to stand by to intervene at the "suitable moment".

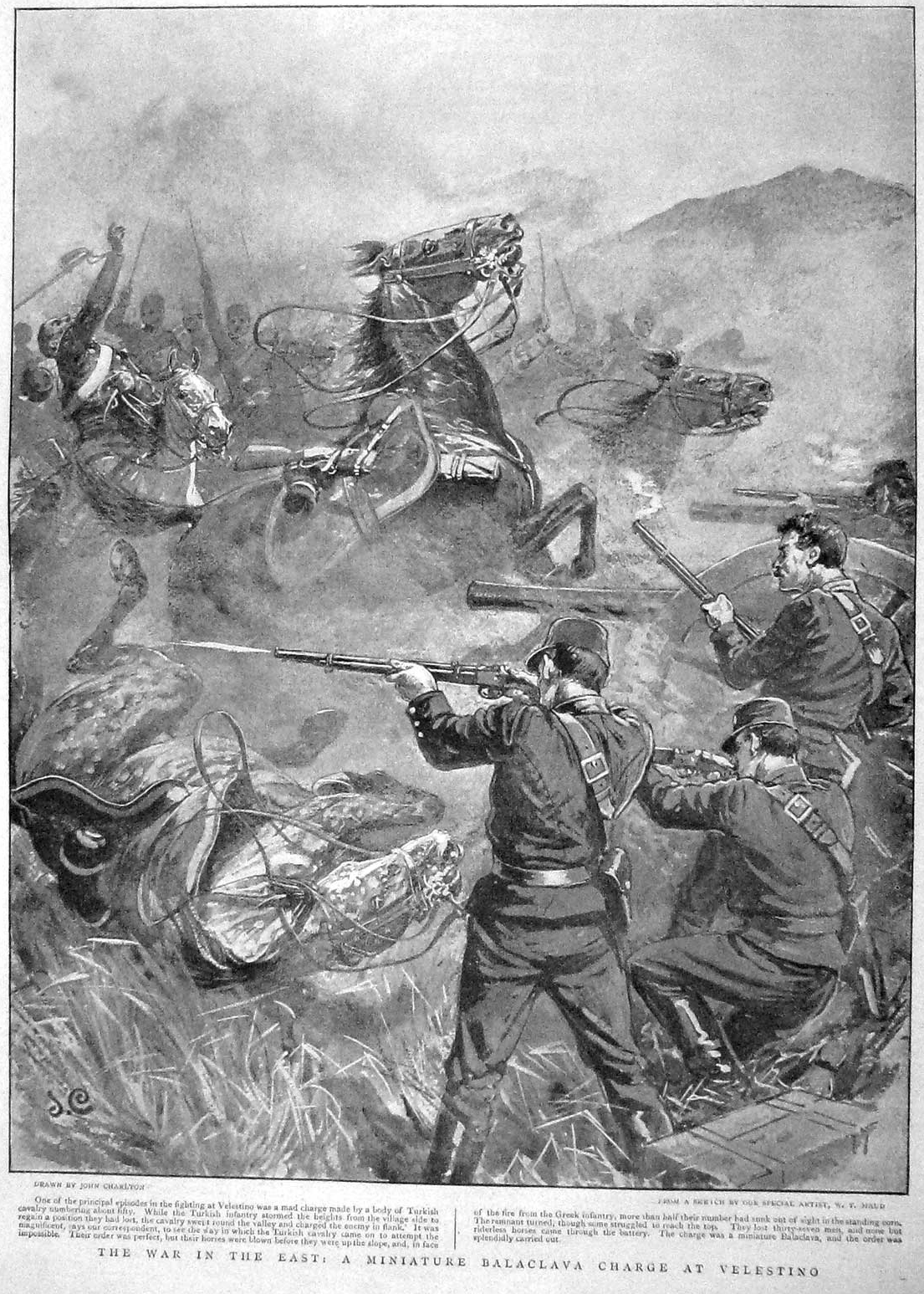
"A miniature Balaclava charge at Velestino": the failed Ottoman cavalry charge of 30 April, drawn by John Charlton

The Ottoman infantry quickly captured the first Greek line, while the Greeks withdrew to their second, main defensive position. Ibrahim Bey had sent an officer to the front line to determine the "suitable moment" and give the signal for the cavalry to attack; the officer did so at that point, when it was clearly premature, as the line of the Greek infantry had not yet been broken.

Consequently, at 13:00 the Ottoman cavalry began to move into position to attack: a first echelon of two companies under Colonel Mahmud Muhtar were tasked with penetrating the Greek positions at the western slopes of Panagia height; Ibrahim Bey led a second echelon of three companies to the left and rear of the first, to assist it in its breakthrough; and a third echelon of two companies followed to the right and rear as a reserve force. While Mahmud Muhtar's first echelon successfully reached the slopes of Panagia and turned south as planned, the second echelon missed the turn and continued advancing to the east. When Ibrahim Bey realized this, it was too late: if he tried to turn south, his men would suffer heavy casualties to the entrenched Greeks on its flank. Thus he ordered his bugler to signal the retreat north. The third echelon followed suit, returning to the positions it had started from. This left Mahmud Muhtar's first echelon, already charging against the Greek trenches west of Panagia, alone and without any support. The Ottoman attack reached the Greek trenches, with some of the cavalrymen fighting with their sabres or dismounting to shoot at the defending Greeks; in the end, the Ottomans were forced to retreat by the heavy fire of the well-entrenched infantry.

At about the same time, at 13:30, the Bursa battalion attacked the second Greek line on Karadagh, defended by IV/7 Battalion. By 15:00, the Ottoman troops found themselves separated from their comrades in the six outflanking companies by a single trench still held by the Greeks. The Greeks, with good artillery support, managed to force the Ottomans to withdraw, leaving two artillery pieces behind.

In the meantime, the six outflanking companies launched five successive attempts to break through or outflank the Greek positions, without success. At 16:30, the Greek III/7 Battalion's 2nd company launched a fierce counterattack which forced them back, leaving 40 dead. With the Greek positions intact, at 16:30 Naim Pasha and Mahmud Muhtar ordered their forces to retreat towards Gherli. By 18:00, with the Ottoman withdrawal in full effect, fire ceased.

Although the day had been a success for the Greeks, the Greek commanders, committed to the doctrine of passive defence, completely failed to exploit their success by launching a pursuit against the strung-out Ottoman forces, even though they disposed of twice as much infantry (7,000 men) as the Ottomans. The counterattack launched by Major Kopsidas, if properly supported, might have destroyed the eastern Ottoman column, but the opportunity was allowed to be lost.

The casualties of the two sides during the First Battle of Velestino were 138 killed and 254 wounded for the Ottomans, and 28 killed and 142 wounded for the Greeks.

== Second Battle of Velestino, 5–6 May ==
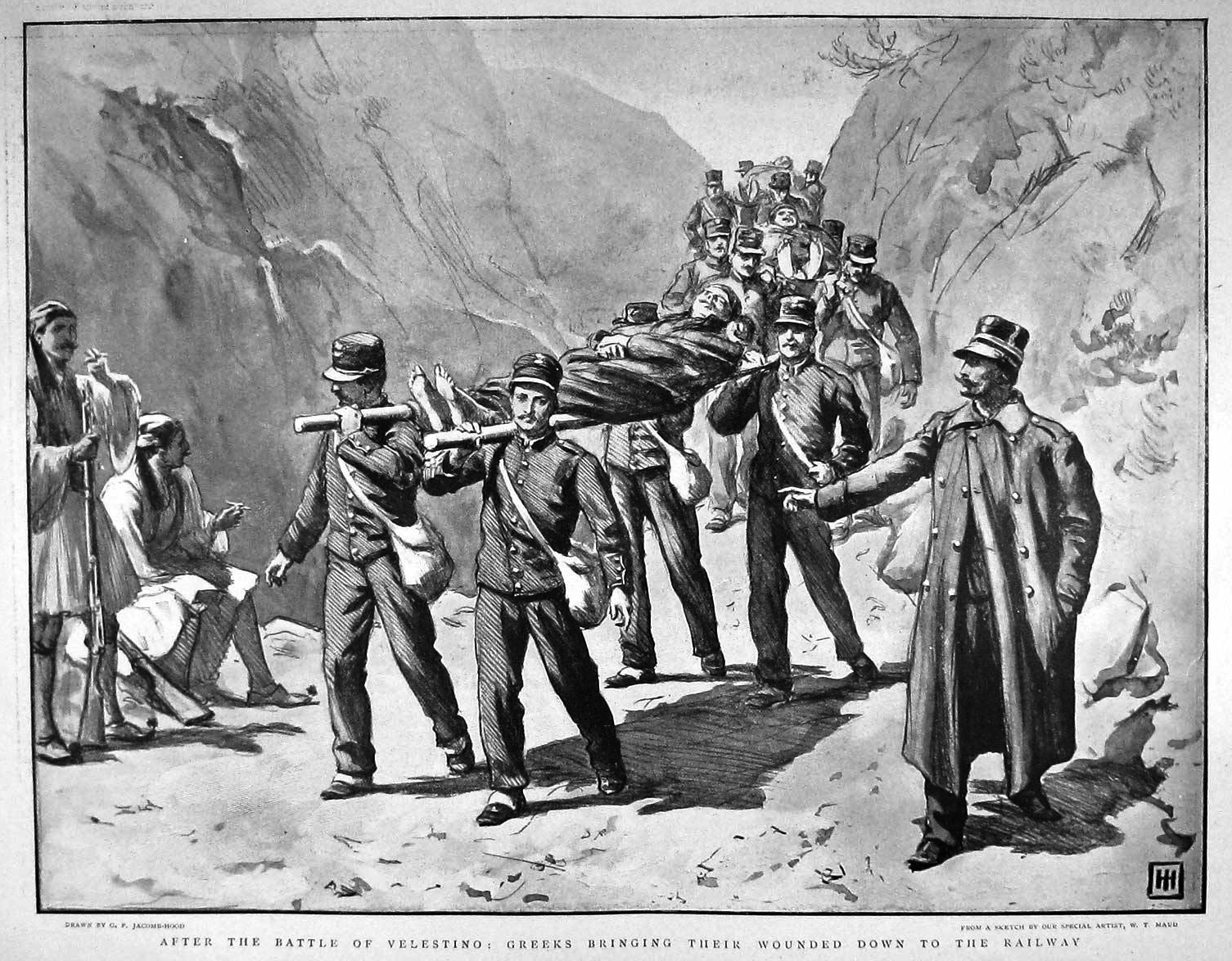
Sketch of a transport of wounded Greek soldiers on stretchers from the heights to the railway line after the battle

Smolenskis expected the Ottomans to try again on the next day, and therefore asked for and received ammunition and reinforcements in the form of the 1st Independent Infantry Battalion and three dismounted cavalry companies, which arrived on 3 May.

On the Ottoman side, Mahmud Muhtar reported to Edhem Pasha in person on 1 May, and expressed the opinion that the bulk of the Greek army was at Velestino, recommending an immediate attack with greater forces. Edhem Pasha disagreed, recalled the units of the Cavalry Division to Larissa, and instead sent the rest of the 5th Division, under Hakki Pasha, to assume a defensive position at Gherli. In preparation for renewing the attack, the division was reinforced during the next days to a total of 17 battalions, 4 cavalry companies, and 4 artillery batteries, a total of 8,500 infantry, 24 guns, and 160 cavalry. The role assigned to the 5th Division was to keep the Greek forces at Velestino pinned in place, so that they could not come to the aid of the rest of the Greek army, which faced the main Ottoman attack around Farsala.

By 5 May, Smolenskis' Mixed Brigade counted 11 battalions (7th and 8th Infantry Regiments, 1st Independent, 6th Evzones), an engineer company, three dismounted and one mounted cavalry companies, and three artillery batteries. At the nearby village of Ayvali, although not placed under Smolenskis' command until the morning of 6 May, was the 4th Evzone Battalion and a mixed sapper-firemen company. In total, the Greek forces numbered 10,228 infantry, 150 cavalry, and 18 guns. The Greek dispositions did not change much since 30 April, except that Smolenskis appointed 8th Regiment commander, Colonel Nikolaos Giannikostas, to command his right wing, while 7th Regiment commander Lieutenant Colonel Stylianos Reglis assumed command of the left wing.

=== 5 May ===
On 5 May in the morning, the Ottoman 5th Division began to move towards Velestino in four columns. Its rightmost (western) column, with the 2nd Infantry Regiment and one mountain artillery company, marched ahead, so as to engage the Greek left and prevent a possible Greek withdrawal towards Farsala. Furthermore, the column was to again attempt the flanking manoeuvre around Karadagh that had been attempted on 30 April. The central column, comprising the heavily reinforced 3rd Regiment (six battalions) and three artillery companies, was to attack the heights directly west of Velestino, while the 4th Regiment formed a left column and marched towards Ovrias Gala. The cavalry formed a separate column between the central and right columns, while an infantry regiment remained at Gherli as reserve. In total, the Ottoman forces deployed for the day's attack were estimated at 6,000 men, two batteries, and small numbers of cavalry.

The Ottomans deployed for battle at 9:00, and by 9:30 captured the Petroto height in front of the positions of the Greek left wing, while other detachments passed through the ravines of Karadagh to try and outflank the Greek positions. The remaining Ottoman columns did not seriously probe the Greek positions. Around 10:00, as the Ottoman forces had approached the Greek positions on the left, a sudden rain and hail storm broke out, reducing visibility to almost zero. The Ottomans exploited this to approach the Greek lines even closer, and managed to occupy some Greek trenches. This led to a brief panic on the Greek front, but order was quickly restored by the officers. As the storm passed after 10:30, the fighting resumed. The Greek batteries were particularly exposed, as the Ottoman artillery had greater range and could fire at them with impunity, and they were forced to cease fire. Nevertheless, aided by gradual reinforcements from the 1st Independent Battalion, the Greek line held against repeated Ottoman attacks. The Ottoman commander also fed 3.5 battalions as reinforcements into the attack, but to no avail. Ottoman artillery fire became more sparse after 18:30, and fighting ended entirely at 19:30. On the extreme Greek left, the Ottoman outflanking manoeuvre was stopped thanks to the timely intervention of two companies from the 4th Evzone Battalion at Ayvali.

Already at 16:30, Hakki Pasha had sent requests for reinforcement of at least a brigade or even an entire division to Edhem Pasha. As the continued presence of the Greeks at Velestino might threaten the flanks of the main Ottoman army, Edhem ordered the 3rd Infantry Division and a reserve brigade to Velestino on the next day, but they did not arrive in time to play any role in the battle. The Greek forces retained their previous dispositions, except that the two companies of the 4th Evzone Battalion were withdrawn as the entire battalion moved to occupy the Ayvali pass to secure the Mixed Brigade's rear from the direction of Farsala.

=== 6 May ===
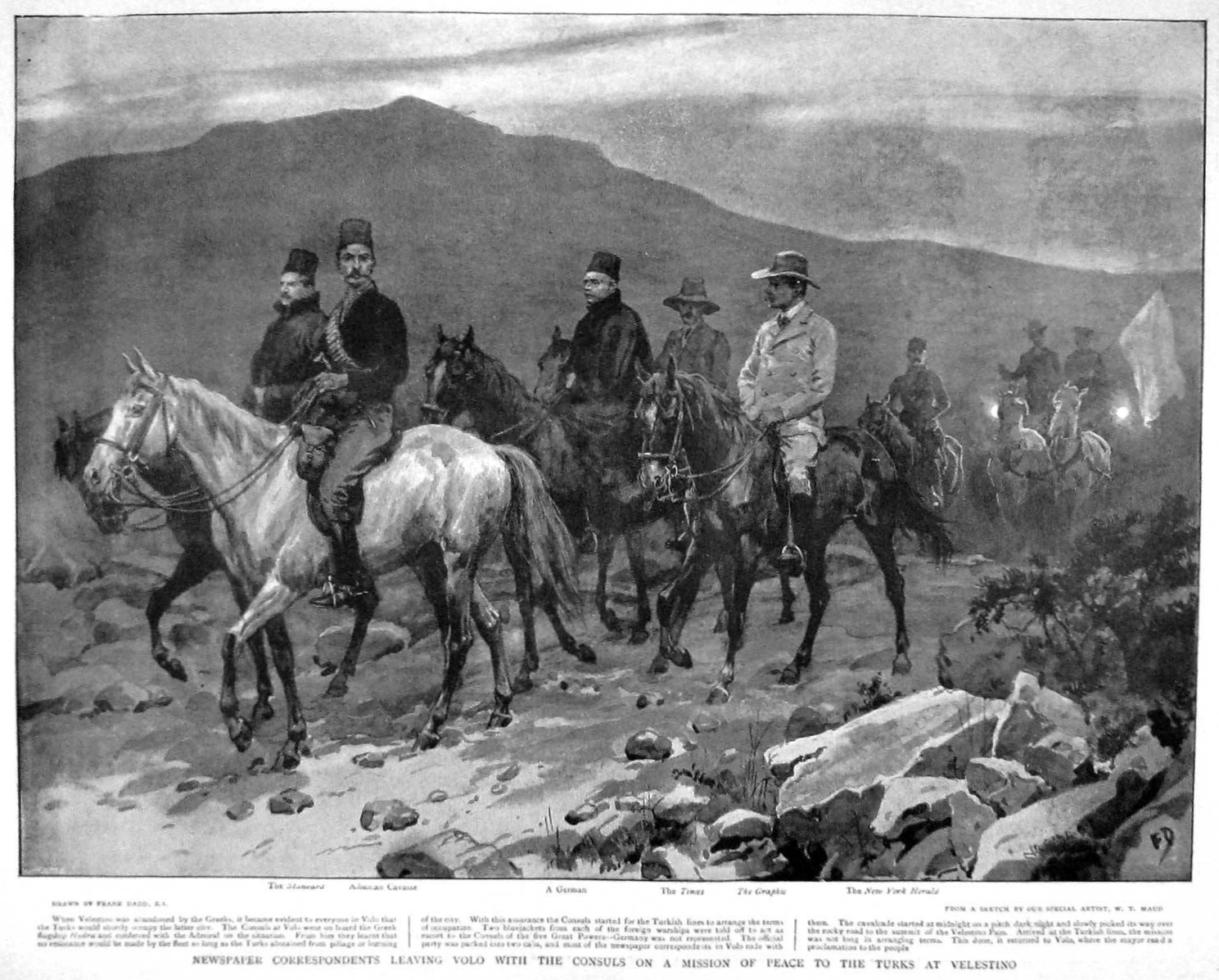
Sketch of the European press correspondents and consuls leaving Volos as peace envoys to Edhem Pasha

At 5:00 on 6 May, the Ottoman attack resumed, pushing against the Greek left with greater forces than the previous day, while applying pressure along the rest of the Greek front as well. Due to the withdrawal of the Evzone companies, the extreme Greek left flank was left exposed. Despite repeated requests of the III/7 Battalion commander, no reinforcements arrived, so that by noon, the Ottoman forces broke through and forced the Greek left to retreat. As the Ottoman forces did not force a pursuit, the Greek retreat did not degenerate to a collapse of the front.

Once informed of these developments, Colonel Smolenskis ordered 7th Regiment to hold at all costs and sent two reserve companies to bolster its position, but they arrived too late. At the same time, Smolenskis was informed by telegram of the defeat of the main Greek army at the Battle of Farsala and its withdrawal to Domokos. Combined with the critical situation on his left, around 15:00 Smolenskis ordered the Brigade to start retreating, beginning with the more exposed units of 8th Regiment in the lower ground. Although the Greek retreat was somewhat disorderly, the Ottomans did not exploit the situation: once they captured the Greek left, they stopped to rest, and another rain storm that broke out around 16:30 helped cover the Greek retreat. The Greeks managed to break off contact with the Ottomans and retire without trouble to Almyros, while some of the units of the right flank withdrew to Volos, where they were picked up by ships of the Greek fleet.

Velestino was captured by the Ottomans on 7 May, where Edhem Pasha met with the European consuls from Volos, who announced to him that the city had been evacuated by the Greek forces. As a result, Edhem sent only two battalions to occupy the city, while the 5th Division remained in the wider area of Velestino.

The total casualties for the Second Battle of Velestino were 59 killed and 361 wounded for the Ottomans and 73 killed and 306 wounded for the Greeks.

== Aftermath ==
The main Greek army withdrew to Domokos, where they began hastily setting up fortifications. The reinforcements that had been sent to Smolenskis' command—1st Independent Battalion, 4th Evzone Battalion, the dismounted cavalry companies, a field artillery battery and the sappers company—were recalled to bolster the defensive position there, while the 3rd Brigade remained at Almyros for the time being, covering the coastal road. The Ottoman 5th Division resumed contact with the positions of the Greek 3rd Brigade on 17 May, but no clashes occurred other than a brief bombardment of the Ottoman positions by Greek warships. On the same day, at the Battle of Domokos, the right flank of the main Greek army was turned back. Without any available reserves, the Greek army was likely to be surrounded, so Crown Prince Constantine decided to again withdraw south. As a result, 3rd Brigade was ordered to retreat to Lamia. An armistice took effect on the next day, which was finalized on 3 June, ending the war.

Amidst a string of humiliating Greek defeats, the successful ten-day defence of Velestino by Smolenskis stood out. Already during the battle, the press clamoured for promoting him to general and commander-in-chief, and contrasted his capable performance during the war with the general ineffectiveness of the military and political leadership. (Note: A typical sample, from Dimitrios Kalapothakis 's daily Empros, at Talantis 2014, pp. 632–652) On 19 May he received a field promotion to major general and was placed in command of the 1st Infantry Division. He was decorated with the Grand Commander of the Order of the Redeemer, and was propelled to the status of a national hero. Already in 1897, the Municipality of Athens gave his name to a street, and he received honorary citizenships from several Greek cities. Medals and lithographs with his portrait were in widespread demand and prominently displayed for several years thereafter. This popularity was quickly used to launch his political career: Smolenskis was twice elected Member of the Hellenic Parliament for the Attica and Boeotia Prefecture, and served twice as Minister for Military Affairs, in the 1897 Alexandros Zaimis cabinet, and in the 1903 Georgios Theotokis cabinet.

== Sources ==
- Ο Ελληνοτουρκικός Πόλεμος του 1897 [The Greco-Turkish War of 1897] (in Greek). Athens: Hellenic Army History Directorate. 1993. OCLC 880458520.
- Pikros, Ioannis (1977). "Ο Ελληνοτουρκικός Πόλεμος του 1897" [The Greco-Turkish War of 1897]. In Christopoulos, Georgios A. & Bastias, Ioannis K. (eds.). Ιστορία του Ελληνικού Έθνους [History of the Greek Nation] (in Greek). Vol. ΙΔ: Νεώτερος Ελληνισμός από το 1881 έως το 1913 [Modern Hellenism from 1881 to 1913]. Athens: Ekdotiki Athinon. ISBN 978-960-213-110-7.
- Pontikas, Apostolos (2014). "Κων. Σμολένσκη, ο θρύλος του Eλληνοτουρκικού πολέμου του 1897 και ήρωας της Μάχης του Βελεστίνου" [Kon. Smolenski, the legend of the Greco-Turkish War of 1897 and hero of the Battle of Velestino]. In Karamberopoulos, Dimitrios A. (ed.). Υπέρεια, Τόμος Έκτος. Πρακτικά Στ′ Διεθνούς Συνεδρίου «Φεραί-Βελεστίνο-Ρήγας», Βελεστίνο, 4-7 Οκτωβρίου 2012. Μέρος Α′, Φεραί-Βελεστίνο (PDF) (in Greek). Athens: Scientific Society of Studies on Pherae-Velestino-Rigas. pp. 613–622. ISBN 978-960-6733-17-8.
- Spyropoulos, N. (1928). "Βελεστῖνον". Μεγάλη Στρατιωτικὴ καὶ Ναυτικὴ Ἐγκυκλοπαιδεία. Tόμος Δεύτερος: Ἀλαρκόν–Γωνιόμετρον [Great Military and Naval Encyclopaedia. Volume II: Alarcon–Goniometer] (in Greek). Athens: Ἔκδοσις Μεγάλης Στρατιωτικῆς καὶ Ναυτικῆς Ἐγκυκλοπαιδείας. pp. 335–337. OCLC 31255024.
- Talantis, Efthymios (2014). "Η Μάχη του Βελεστίνου μέσα από τις στήλες της ημερησίας αθηναϊκής εφημερίδας ΕΜΠΡΟΣ" [The Battle of Velestino in the columns of the daily Athenian newspaper EMPROS]. In Karamberopoulos, Dimitrios A. (ed.). Υπέρεια, Τόμος Έκτος. Πρακτικά Στ′ Διεθνούς Συνεδρίου «Φεραί-Βελεστίνο-Ρήγας», Βελεστίνο, 4-7 Οκτωβρίου 2012. Μέρος Α′, Φεραί-Βελεστίνο (PDF) (in Greek). Athens: Scientific Society of Studies on Pherae-Velestino-Rigas. pp. 629–654. ISBN 978-960-6733-17-8.
