= Arel =

Arel can refer to:

- Erelim, type of angel
- Arlon, city in Belgium (called "Arel" in Luxembourgish)
- Erel (name), Hebrew and Turkish name

== See also ==
- Cynoglossus arel, tonguefish species
- Istanbul Arel University, university in Istanbul, Turkey
