= Edhem Pasha =

Ottoman field marshal

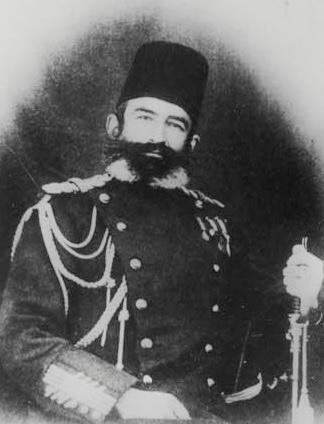
- Born: Edhem; 1844; Trabzon, Trebizond Eyalet, Ottoman Empire
- Died: 1909 (aged 57–58); Constantinople, Ottoman Empire
- Military career
- Allegiance: Ottoman Empire
- Branch: Ottoman Army
- Service years: c. 1868–1909
- Rank: Field marshal
- Commands: Thessalian front
- Conflicts: Russo-Turkish War (1877-1878): Siege of Plevna; Greco-Turkish War (1897): Battle of Domokos; Battle of Velestino; Cretan Revolt

Edhem Pasha (Turkish: Ethem Paşa; also known as Gazi Edhem Paşa, 1844–1909) was an Ottoman Turkish field marshal and leading figure in the propagation of the Ottoman military doctrine.

== Life and career ==
Edhem was born to a Muslim Turkish family in Trabzon which was then part of the Ottoman Empire. He was the deputy of Osman Nuri Pasha during the Siege of Plevna in 1877. He was the leading commander of the Ottoman army that defeated the Greek army on the Thessalian front during the Greco-Turkish War (1897), which would end in a decisive Ottoman victory. Edhem Pasha was especially successful in the Battle of Domokos on the front. He captured Larissa and Trikala, but other European states intervened in favor of Greece before he could advance on the capital, due to the danger that the Ottomans could once again capture the rest of the Morea and annex Greece. As a result, the Greco-Ottoman War resulted in a strategic stalemate despite the Ottoman military victory on the field. Due to his success on the battlefield, he was given the title of Gazi by Abdulhamid II. He later became the Ottoman minister of war, but he was only the minister for two weeks- he moved to Egypt because of ill health. Edhem Pasha died in Egypt, and he was buried in Constantinople (modern-day Istanbul) in 1909.
