= Leonidas Smolents =

Greek politician and soldier (1806–1882)

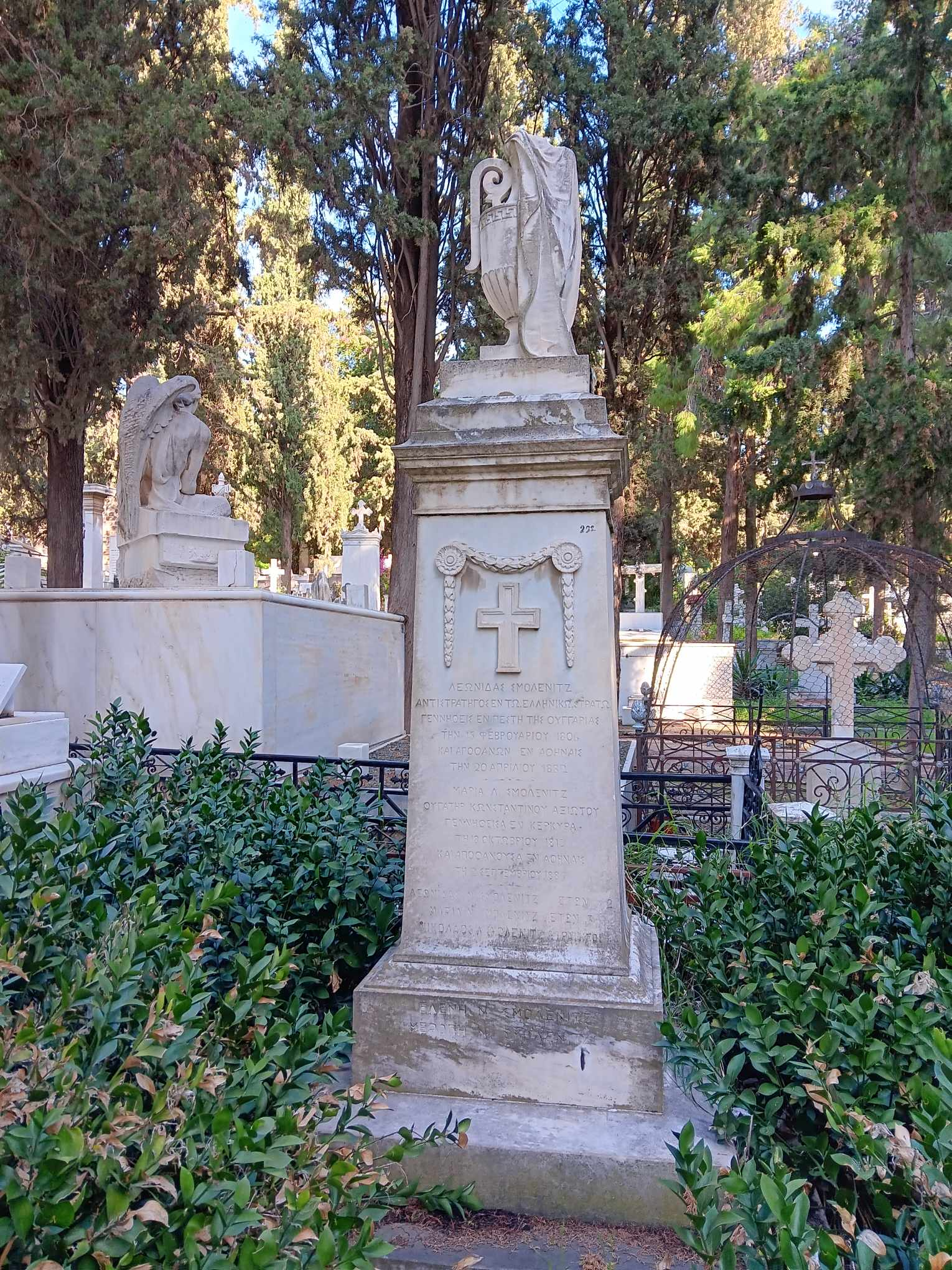
Tombstone of Leonidas Smolents

Leonidas Smolents, Smolenits or Smolenskis (Greek: Λεωνίδας Σμόλεντς/Σμόλενιτς/Σμολένσκης; 1806 – 21 April 1882) was an Austrian military officer of Greek origin, who after 1830 settled in the newly independent Kingdom of Greece and became a general and Minister for Military Affairs.

== Career ==
Leonidas Smolents was born in 1806, in Pest, Hungary, and grew up in Vienna. He originated from an Aromanian–Greek family from Moscopole, and was the great-grandson of Simon Smolenic, a merchant who had settled in Hungary, become wealthy, and been ennobled by Francis II of the Holy Roman Empire in 1797 as an Imperial Knight with the surname "von Smolik". After completing military studies at the Theresian Military Academy, he was commissioned into the Imperial Austrian Army as a second lieutenant of the engineers in 1822. From 1822 to 1824, he participated in the Austrian occupation of the Kingdom of the Two Sicilies.

In 1825, with the Greek War of Independence in full swing, he resigned and tried to come to Greece, but was prevented by the Austrian government. He finally managed to come to Greece in 1830, joining the nascent Greek Army as a lieutenant of engineers under Governor Ioannis Kapodistrias.

Under King Otto of Greece, he gradually climbed the military hierarchy, although after the 3 September 1843 Revolution, due to his foreign name he was exposed to the ire of the populace against the Bavarian officers that had dominated the state in the first decade of Otto's rule; the founder of the National Bank of Greece, Georgios Stavros, and two others who had known him in Vienna had to issue a certificate testifying to his Greek origin. Nevertheless, in the National Assembly elected to draft the Greek Constitution of 1843, he was elected as representative of Attica.

He served as Minister for Military Affairs in the Dimitrios Voulgaris cabinet of 1855–1857. He particularly distinguished himself in the combating of the banditry endemic in the country, resulting in the arrest of 313 bandits, the surrender of 35, the death of 156, and the capture of 117 dealers in stolen goods. King Otto decorated him with the Commander's Cross of the Order of the Redeemer.

Under King George I of Greece, he was promoted to major general, and served again as Minister for Military Affairs in the cabinets of Zinovios Valvis (1863), Thrasyvoulos Zaimis (1870) and Alexandros Koumoundouros (1871). He also was appointed twice as overall military commander of the Peloponnese and once of Attica, as well as serving as army inspector and president of the Revisionary Military Tribunal.

He died at Athens on 21 April 1882, aged 75 or 76.

== Family ==
Leonidas Smolents married Maria Axioti, daughter of a distinguished military officer and politician Konstantinos Axiotis. The couple had two sons: Nikolaos Smolenits and Konstantinos Smolenskis, both of whom became army officers, generals and Ministers for Military Affairs.

== Sources ==
- Evangelidis, Tryfon E. (1898). "Κωνσταντίνος Σμολένσκης: Βιογραφικόν Δοκίμιον" [Konstantinos Smolenskis: Biographical Essay]. Κων. Φ. Σκοκου Ετησιον Ημερολογιον Χρονογραφικον, Φιλολογικον Και Γελοιογραφικον Του Ετους 1898 (in Greek). Athens: 81–87. Archived from the original on 2019-07-20.
- Pontikas, Apostolos (2014). "Κων. Σμολένσκη, ο θρύλος του Eλληνοτουρκικού πολέμου του 1897 και ήρωας της Μάχης του Βελεστίνου" [Kon. Smolenski, the legend of the Greco-Turkish War of 1897 and hero of the Battle of Velestino]. In Karamberopoulos, Dimitrios A. (ed.). Υπέρεια, Τόμος Έκτος. Πρακτικά Στ′ Διεθνούς Συνεδρίου "Φεραί-Βελεστίνο-Ρήγας", Βελεστίνο, 4-7 Οκτωβρίου 2012. Μέρος Α′, Φεραί-Βελεστίνο (PDF) (in Greek). Athens: Scientific Society of Studies on Pherae-Velestino-Rigas. pp. 613–622. ISBN 978-960-6733-17-8.
