= Leon Melas =

Greek politician (1812–1879)

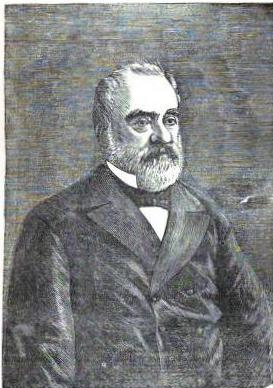
Leon Melas (Magazine Poikili Stoa, 1881)

Leon Melas (Greek: Λέων Μελάς, 1812–1879) was a Greek politician, representative to the National Assemblies of 1843 and 1862, and a writer. His greatest work was the novel Gerostathis. He excelled as Minister of Justice, Ecclesiastical Affairs and Education, as a university professor, magistrate and lawyer.

== Biographical information ==
Leon Melas was born in 1812 in Istanbul and was the eldest son of the merchant Georgios Melas. His childhood coincided with the preparation of the Greek Revolution of 1821 by the Filiki Etaireia and the environment in which he grew up comprised the Etaireia's most eminent members.

After the beginning of the Revolution his family fled to Odessa in the Russian Empire. There Leon received his general education. Then, after studying at the Ionian Academy of Corfu (then in the United States of the Ionian Islands) and the University of Pisa (then in the Papal States), he was acclaimed a doctor of law. He came to newly independent Greece in 1833 where he practiced law first in Syros and later in Nafplio. In 1837 he became professor of law at the newly created University of Athens. He participated as a representative to the National Assembly of 1843 and the National Assembly in 1862. He served as Minister of Justice several times, in the Alexandros Mavrokordatos cabinet (1841), in the revolutionary cabinet of Andreas Metaxas (1843) and in the cabinet of Konstantinos Kanaris (1844) but was persecuted later due to his democratic beliefs, since he had refused to impose censorship in the newspapers of the time.

In 1866, with the beginning of the Cretan Revolution against the Ottomans, he took over the presidency of the “Central Commission of Cretans in Athens” and offered important services. Furthermore, he was a distinguished scholar and educator. His most important work is considered the Gerostathis or memories of my childhood (1858), which was used for decades as a textbook. He also wrote the works: Christopher, The Handbook of Greek children, The Little Plutarch etc. Leon Melas was also chairman of the Council of the Educational Society and was the one who introduced the lesson of pedagogy in the Arsakeion college.

He died on 8 October 1879 in Athens . He left his legacy to many public welfare institutions and the rights to his books to the Association for the Dissemination of Greek Letters. His wife was Rallou Nikolaou Thoma and his nephews were Demetrios Vikelas and Pavlos Melas.

== Bibliography ==
- Vassilios Dimaratos, Γενικά τινα περί της οικογενείας Μελά: Ανατύπωσις εκ του Γ΄ βιογραφικού παραρτήματος των ‘Ηπειρωτικών Χρονικών’, Athens, τύποις ‘Φοίνικος’, 1931.
- Pavlos Drandakis, Μεγάλη Ελληνική Εγκυκλοπαίδεια, vol. 16, p. 861-2.
- Leon I. Melas, Ηπειρωτικές Μελέτες/Μια οικογένεια-Μια ιστορία, Athens, 1967.
- Εκδοτική Αθηνών, Παγκόσμιο Βιογραφικό Λεξικό, vol. 6, p. 117.
