= Battle of Domokos =

Battle of the Greco-Turkish War of 1897

- Part of the Greco-Turkish War (1897)
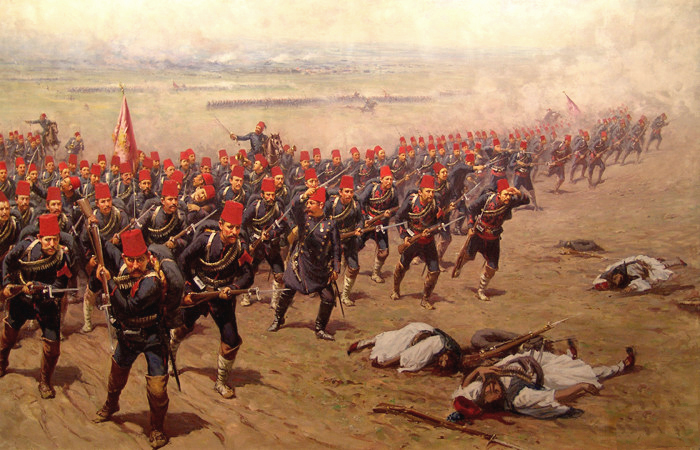
- The Attack, a painting of the Ottoman forces at Domokos, by Fausto Zonaro.
Date	May 17, 1897
Location	Domokos, Phthiotis, Greece
Result	Ottoman victory

Belligerents
Ottoman Empire	Greece: (Kingdom of Italy) Italian volunteers; Redshirts

Commanders and leaders
Edhem Pasha; Abdülezel Pasha; Halil Halit Bey	(Greece) Crown Prince Constantine (Kingdom of Italy) Ricciotti Garibaldi

Strength
45,000	(Greece) 40,000 (Kingdom of Italy) 2,000

The Battle of Domokos (Turkish: Dömeke muharebesi) took place between the Ottoman Empire and the Kingdom of Greece. This battle was a part of the Greco-Turkish War (1897). The battle resulted in an Ottoman victory, and prompted European powers to intervene on behalf of Greece to prevent further Ottoman advances into Greek territory.

== Background ==
After Greece tried to annex the island Crete the Ottoman porte declared war on Greece. The commander of the Ottoman army at Elassona (Turkish: Alasonya) was Edhem Pasha (later gained the title Gazi) . He was one of the younger generals of the Ottoman Army (then 46) and his appointment as commander perplexed many. The commander of the Greek army was the Prince Constantine. The Ottoman army in Domokos was 45,000 strong and the Greek army was 40,000 strong The Greek side also had 2000 Italian irregulars under the command of Ricciotti Garibaldi.

== The battle ==
According to a contemporary source following initial victories, Ethem Pasha had some of his troops in Velestino (which was the theatre of a battle) and most in Pharsala. But there was a momentary pause after the second battle of Valestino. The new Greek prime minister Dimitrios Rallis was anxious to accept the mediation which the Great Powers were willing to undertake. Failing to reach a compromise, Edhem Pasha marched from Phasla to the town of Domokos (Dömeke) on 17 May 1897. Domakos was the stronghold of the Greek army against the advancing Ottoman army.

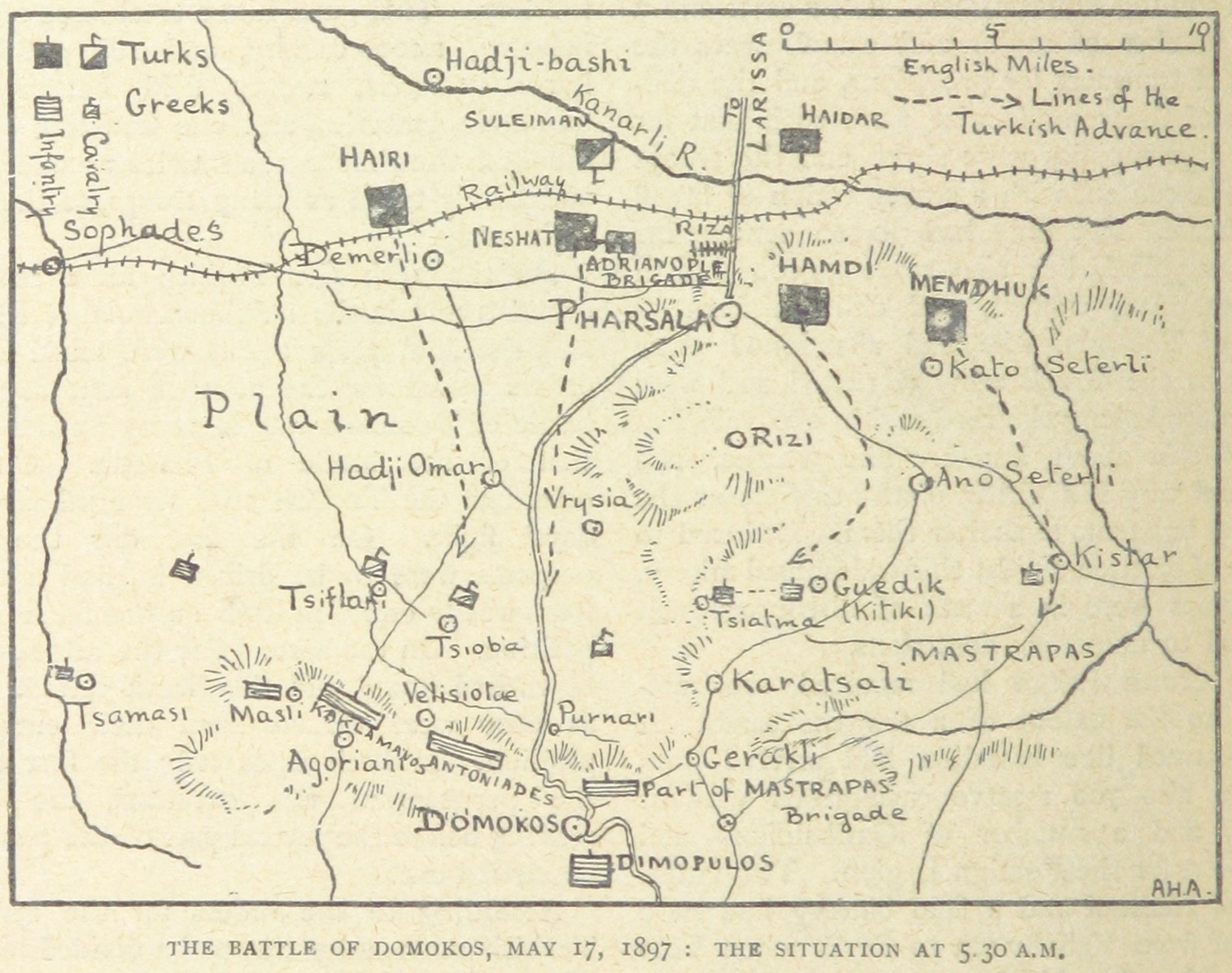
The Ottoman advance

The Turks advanced in several groups in the early morning of the 17th; Hayri Pasha's division on the right, heading towards Tsioba; Neşet Pasha's division to its left, on the main road to Domokos; Hamdi Pasha in the center; Mahmud Pasha's division on the left, intending to hit the Greek's right flank, and Haydar Pasha's division following Hamdi Pasha's.

The first shots were fired at around 10 am on the left of the Greek lines, when Hayri Pasha's forces encountered a small force of Greek cavalry in the village of Tsioba. Hayri Pasha overestimated the Greek force and advanced cautiously; it took his troops an hour to take the village. Neşet's troops were delayed as well, as they had orders not to advance forward of Hayri's troops. Hamdi also encountered Greek troops around 10 am.

The Turkish left wing under Hamdi and Memduh advanced slowly, hampered by the difficult ground and the resistance put up by the Greek troops under Colonel Mastrapas. The Greek Fourth Division held Hamdi's Albanian regulars back for some time before Hamdi forced his way forward with artillery. Memduh's forces faced similar difficulties against the Euzonoi defending against his advance.

By 3 pm the Greeks had withdrawn from the plains in front of Domlokos, and Neşet's artillery had begun shelling the Greek lines. The Turkish infantry from Neşet and Hayri's divisions pressed forward under Greek artillery fire, reaching positions 400-600 yards from the Greek trenches. At sunset, the artillery fire died down, and the Greek positions seemed intact.

At 11 pm Ethem Pasha received word from Hamdi. Hamdi and Memduh were in position on the Greek right, ready to attack the right or right rear of the Greek positions. Ethem gave orders for Hamdi to attack the Greek right the next day, while Memduh swung around to cut off the Greek line of retreat through the Phurka Pass. Prince Constantine realized the danger posed by the Turkish forces on their right, and retreated during the night, leaving their fires burning to keep the Turks from noticing the retreat.

== Aftermath ==
Ethem took the initiative and advanced to Thermopylae about 40 kilometres (25 mi) south. Although the pass was heavily defended by the Greek army it was captured. But the Ottoman grand vizier Halil Rifat Pasha was planning to capture Athens (to be used a bargaining chip in the future negotiations). Nevertheless, the great powers of Europe pressured the Ottoman government into signing a peace agreement. Two days after the battle both sides ceased fire. Although the Ottoman army was victorious on the battlefield, the porte lost the control of Crete.
