= Jeremy Arel =

American BJJ practitioner

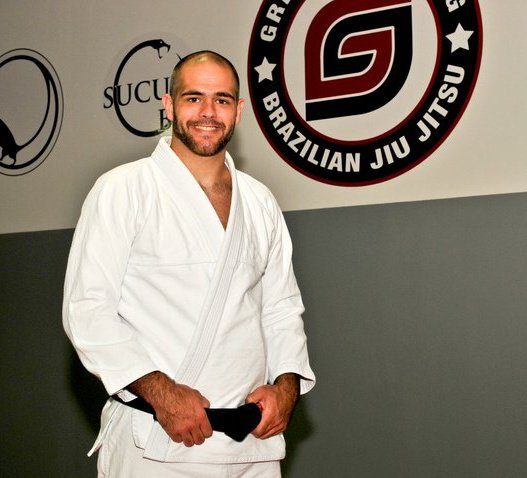
- Born: Jeremy James Arel; September 7, 1981 (age 45); Northampton, Massachusetts, U.S.
- Other names: The Gerbil
- Style: Brazilian Jiu-Jitsu
- Rank: 1st Degree Black belt in Brazilian Jiu-Jitsu

Other information
- Website: http://www.greatgrappling.com/

Jeremy Arel aka “The Gerbil” is an American grappler in the sport of Brazilian Jiu Jitsu who is well known for his blog on living and training in Rio de Janeiro as well as his YouTube tutorial channel.

== Early life ==
Jeremy James Arel was born September 7, 1981, in Northampton, Massachusetts. He began martial arts at an early age thanks to the inspiration from his uncle, Martial Arts Hall of Famer Robert Arel. At 7 he began Isshin-Ryu and then moved to Jeet Kune Do . During his time training Jeet Kune Do he began a rigorous training schedule that would set the pace for the rest of his martial arts career, training as much as possible outside of academic classes. After 6 years of Jeet Kune Do his academy changed directions and began opening up the style to encompass “MMA” training. Under his academy's belt system he achieved the rank of black belt and began competing in boxing, kickboxing, and grappling tournaments. During this time Arel also competed for an alternate position on the World Kickboxing Association's US National Kickboxing Team. In 2004, after serving with the US Army National Guard in Operation Iraqi Freedom, Arel began his career in Brazilian Jiu Jitsu when he joined an Alliance Jiu Jitsu affiliate in Charlotte, NC. He achieved the rank of purple belt under the guidance of the late Luis Togno. After several additional years of training in a no-gi combat style jiu jitsu, Arel made the decision to make Brazilian Jiu Jitsu his life's work and dedicate himself full-time to attaining the rank of black belt. In 2009 Arel moved to Rio de Janeiro, Brazil and achieved the rank of brown belt under the legendary Gracie Barra black belt Roberto “Gordo” Correa. After a brief return home he once again traveled to Rio where he was promoted to black belt under Gordo on December 11, 2010. Jeremy Arel is a graduate from Winthrop University with a degree in Health & Physical Education and is the owner/head instructor of Great Grappling Brazilian Jiu Jitsu in Fort Mill, SC, just outside Charlotte, NC.

== Sherdog Blog / Brazil ==
In May 2009 Jeremy made a decision that would alter the course of his life when he committed to moving to Rio de Janeiro, Brazil to continue his training in Brazilian Jiu Jitsu. Arel documented his travels, training, and stories through a blog maintained on Sherdog.com's grappling forums under the avatar “GerbilJiuJitsu”. This blog served to share his stories with the worldwide grappling community as he experienced life as a gringo in Brazil. On this thread he discusses life at the ConnectionRio house, training at Roberto “Gordo” Correa's school, and his progression from purple, to brown, and eventually black belt. The blog's popularity exploded with over 1 million views and BJJ players from around the world began traveling to ConnectionRio on the recommendation and experiences from Arel's writings. “The Gerbil” can be credited as having a tremendous influence on inspiring BJJ and MMA athletes from around the world to travel and train in Brazil.

== YouTube Channel ==
On the heels of the success of his Sherdog.com blog, Arel's new project is a series of instructional videos on YouTube.com. His opinion is that there are no secrets in BJJ and he wishes to share his knowledge with the community for the purpose of growing the level of competition in the sport worldwide. These videos follow the same curriculum taught by Arel in his academy. Once the 200+ videos from his core curriculum have been made available, he plans to begin producing no-gi and advanced technique videos as well.

== Competition Achievements ==
- 2004 Tennessee State Champion
- 2007 NAGA Champion (No-Gi Advanced)
- 2006 & 2007 NC State Champion (Gi Advanced)
- 2007 Hayastan Grappling Challenge Champion (No-Gi Advanced)
- 2006 NC State Silver Medalist (No-Gi)
- 2010 No-Gi & 2011 Gi Bud Cup Advanced Silver Medalist
- 2010 Rio Open Bronze Medalist
