= Hakkı Şinasi Erel =

Turkish politician (1871–1941)

Member of the Grand National Assembly

Personal details
- Born: 1871 Constantinople, Ottoman Empire
- Died: 22 October 1941 (aged 69–70)

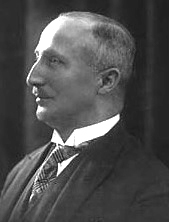
Hakkı Şinasi Erel, 1930s

İsmail Hakkı Erel (1871 – 22 October 1941) was a Turkish admiral, government minister and Kemalist politician, who was instrumental in modernizing the Turkish Navy in the 1920s. By profession he was a medical doctor.
