= Achilleas Protosyngelos =

Greek Army officer (1879–1943)

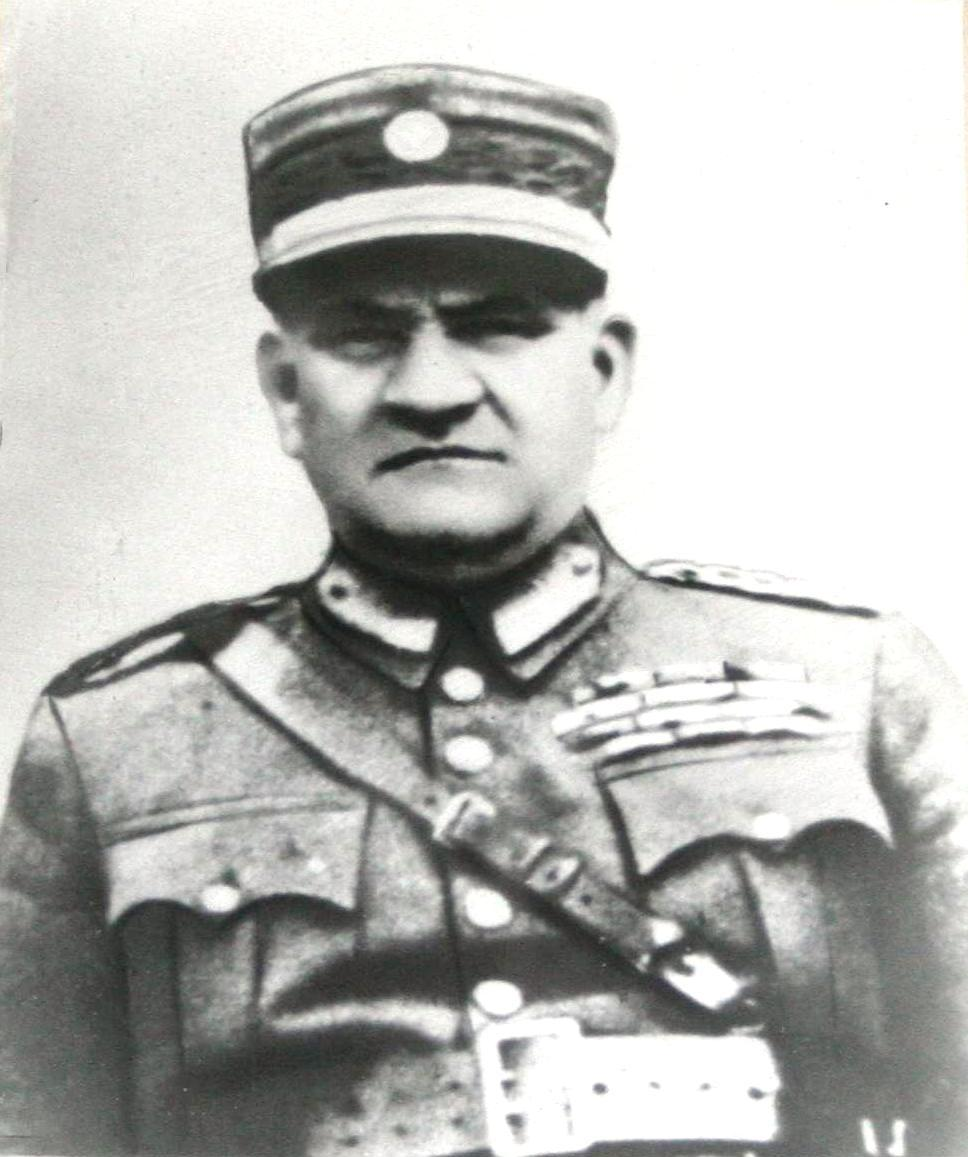
- Achilleas Protosyngelos c. 1935
- Native name: Αχιλλέας Πρωτοσύγκελος
- Born: 1 January 1879; Larissa, Kingdom of Greece
- Died: 15 December 1943 (aged 64) Athens, Hellenic State
- Allegiance: Kingdom of Greece; (Greece) Provisional Government of National Defence; (Greece) Second Hellenic Republic
- Branch: Hellenic Army
- Rank: Lieutenant General
- Commands: 3rd Infantry Regiment; 2nd Infantry Division; Deputy Chief of Hellenic Army General Staff; Commandant of the Supreme War School
- Conflicts: Balkan Wars, World War I, Southern Russia Intervention, Greco-Turkish War (1919-1922)
- Other work: Minister of Public Order; Director-General of the Ministry of Military Affairs; Member of the Secret Revolutionary Organization (MEO)

Achilleas Protosyngelos (Greek: Αχιλλέας Πρωτοσύγκελος, 1879–1943) was a Hellenic Army officer who fought in the Balkan Wars, World War I, the Asia Minor Campaign, and reached the rank of lieutenant general.

== Biography ==
Born in Larissa on 1 January 1879, he enlisted in the Hellenic Army as a volunteer in 1901, after finishing school. He then entered the NCO School and was commissioned as a 2nd Lieutenant of Infantry in 1909. He was a fellow student of Nikolaos Plastiras, who became a close friend. He participated in the Goudi Coup of the same year.

In the First Balkan War of 1912–13 he served as a staff officer in the 4th Infantry Regiment and in the Metsovo Brigade in the Army of Epirus. He participated in the Second Balkan War as a company commander in the 4th Regiment, and fought in the battles of Kilkis and Kresna Gorge. As an ardent follower of Eleftherios Venizelos, during the First World War and the National Schism he joined the Provisional Government of National Defence and fought in the Macedonian front in 1916–18. His crowning moment was the victory at the Battle of Skra in May 1918, where he participated as chief of staff of the Archipelago Division. For his service he was promoted from Major to Lt. Colonel.

In 1919 Protosyngelos participated in the unsuccessful Allied intervention in Ukraine, before going to serve in the staff of the Army of Asia Minor, where he was among the planners of the Greek summer offensive of 1920, which led to the capture of Prussa. He was then placed in command of the 3rd Infantry Regiment (later renamed as the 48th Regiment), a post he held until the defeat and collapse of the Greek front in August 1922. In the subsequent retreat to the coast of Asia Minor, he was able to successfully evacuate his unit to Lesbos. Protosyngelos was among the leaders of the 11 September 1922 Revolution, and became one of the twelve members of the Revolutionary Committee.

He served as Minister for Public Order in 1924, Inspector-General of Infantry (1926), Commander of the 2nd Infantry Division (1926–28) and of the Athens Garrison (1929), before becoming Director-General of the Ministry of Military Affairs (1930–34), Deputy Chief of the Hellenic Army General Staff (1934–35), and finally Commander of the Supreme War School (1935–36). He was discharged from service on 16 July 1936 with the rank of Lt. General. An opponent of the subsequent dictatorial 4th of August Regime of General Ioannis Metaxas, Protosyngelos joined the Secret Revolutionary Organization (MEO), which aimed to overthrow the regime.

Protosyngelos was married, but died childless at his home in Athens on 15 December 1943, during the Axis occupation of Greece.
