= Battle of Bergama =

1919 battle of the Greco-Turkish War

Coordinates: 39°07′N 27°12′E

- Part of the Greco-Turkish War (1919–22)
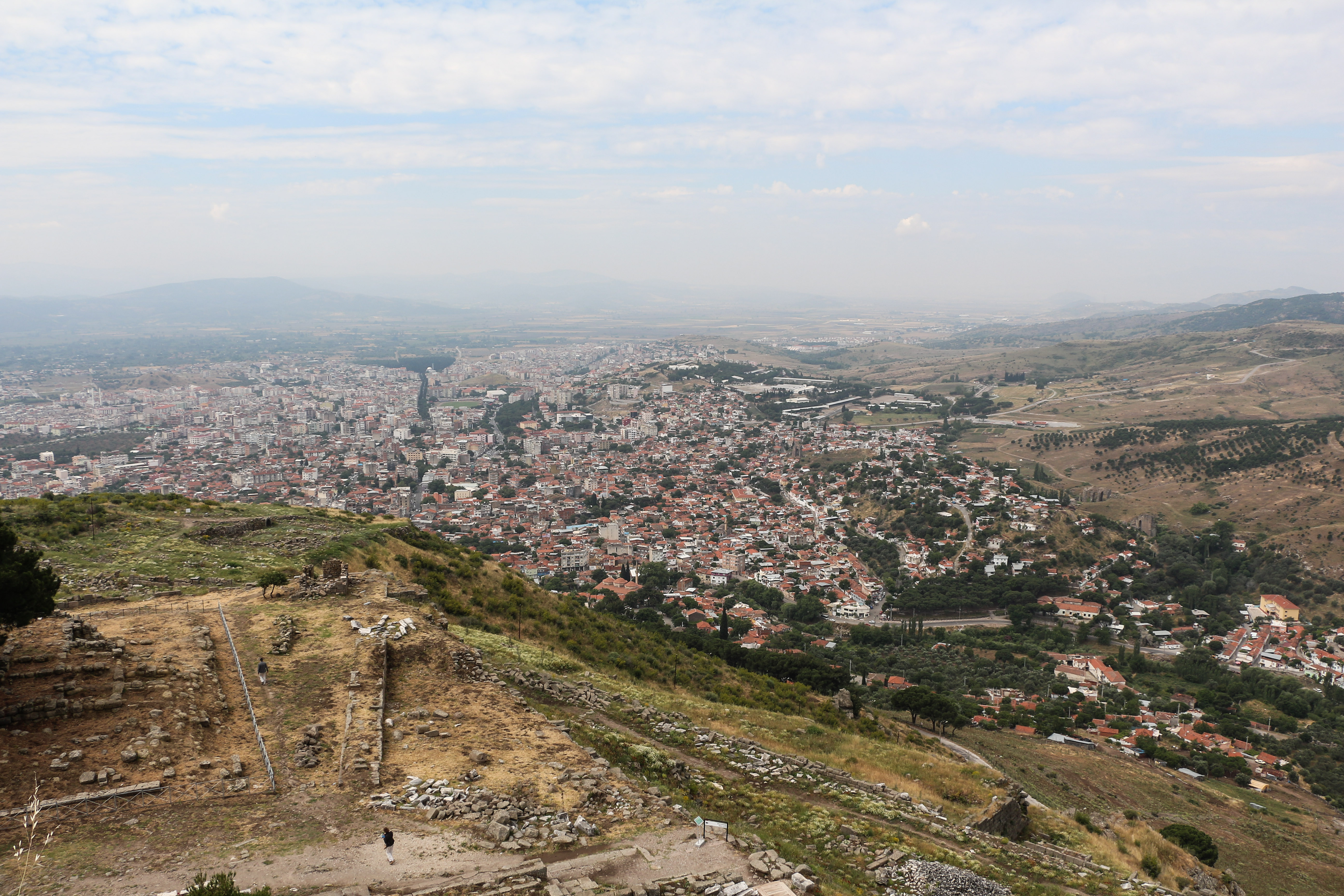
- The town of Bergama in 2014, seen from the ancient acropolis of Pergamon
Date	15–20 June 1919
Location	Bergama
Result	Greek victory

Belligerents
(Kingdom of Greece) Greece	Kuva-yi Milliye

Commanders and leaders
12 June: Major Apostolos Sermakezis; 18–20 June: Col. Charalambos Tseroulis; Col. Mavroudis	Kemal Muratoğlu

Strength
12 June: 800 infantry, 80 cavalry, 3 machine guns, 2 cannons 18–20 June: 3,000 infantry	1,000

Casualties and losses
10 dead, 9 wounded, 86 missing in action (mostly killed)	70+ (first day only)

The Battle of Bergama was fought at and near Bergama (ancient Pergamon, now a district center of İzmir Province, Turkey) between the Greek army and forces of the nascent Turkish National Movement (Kuva-yi Milliye) during the Greco-Turkish War of 1919–1922. The Turkish forces pushed the Greek army from Bergama on 15 June, but a Greek counterattack retook the town on 20 June and pushed the Turkish forces back towards Soma.

== Background ==
Following the decisions of the Allied Supreme War Council, on 14 May 1919 the city of Smyrna (İzmir) was occupied by the Greek army. Over the following weeks, the Greek army began expanding its zone of occupation around the city, The Greek occupation immediately faced armed resistance by irregular forces, and was hampered due to political considerations: as the Smyrna Zone was still officially Ottoman territory, Turkish officials remained in place in the civil administration, as well as in the telegraph and railways; censorship was not imposed and allowed the propaganda of the Turkish National Movement to be freely distributed; and the disarming of the civilian population (including demobilized Ottoman soldiers) was prohibited by the Allies. This allowed the Turks to freely recruit and gather arms and ammunition, creating armed groups often directed by discharged Ottoman Army officers.

General Yusuf İzzet Pasha, commander of the Ottoman XIV Corps, established his headquarters at Balıkesir. The 172nd Infantry Regiment at Ayvalık and the 188th at Soma were reinforced with Nationalist volunteers and organized into zone commands under Lieutenant Colonels Ali Çetinkaya and Akif, respectively. Many of the volunteers were veterans led by experienced officers. Yusuf İzzet issued orders for the recapture of Bergama on 11 June.

== Greek occupation of Bergama ==
Bergama (ancient Pergamon) is located some 90 kilometres (56 mi) north of Smyrna, in the valley of the Bakırçay (ancient Kaïkos) river. On 12 June 1919, it was occupied by a Greek detachment of the 1st Battalion of the 8th Cretan Regiment, a mountain artillery platoon, and a half-company of cavalry, under Major Apostolos Sermakezis. The local kaymakam protested that the occupation of the city was not included in the terms agreed between the Ottoman government and the Allies. The subsequent Inter-Allied Commission of Inquiry concluded that Bergama lay within the Smyrna sanjak and that its occupation was authorized by the Entente's instructions of 20 May. On the next day, part of the detachment (110 men with a machine-gun squad) was moved to the port town of Dikili, to ensure the supply of the Greek force. On the same day, Sermakezis notified his superior command in Smyrna (1st Infantry Division headquarters under Colonel Nikolaos Zafeiriou) that Turkish forces began assembling around Bergama to attack his position.

The Turkish forces around Bergama were commanded by Kemal Muratoğlu, the military commander of Soma. They comprised irregular and a few regular Turkish forces from Soma, Kınık, Balıkesir, Kaşıkçı, Turanlı, Ayvalık and Kozak.

The Greek forces in the town comprised two and a half infantry companies, three machine-gun squads, two mountain guns and the cavalry half-company. They occupied the heights around the town, and particularly the ancient acropolis hill to the northeast ("Old Bergama") and the bridge and aqueduct over the Bakırçay river.

== Battle ==
The Turkish attack on the town started at 10:00 of 15 June, with attacks on the entire defensive perimeter of the Greek detachment. On the same morning, the guard on the river bridge and a supply column heading to Dikili were also attacked by irregulars; the men of the latter were almost all killed. The supply column consisted of 38 men and eight two-wheeled carts and was ambushed approximately 6–7 kilometres outside Bergama. At the same time, the telegraph lines were cut. Once this became known in Smyrna, Colonel Zafeiriou ordered the 6th Archipelago Regiment (Col. Charalambos Tseroulis) to board ship to Dikili to come to the assistance of the garrison at Bergama. The regiment was embarked at midnight, and arrived at Dikili on the next morning.

In the meantime, however, the Turkish forces attacking Bergama had been steadily gaining ground, using the hills and woods of the area as cover. By 11:00, sizeable Turkish forces had approached the town in strength some 6 kilometres (3.7 mi) to the east, 4 kilometres (2.5 mi) to the south, and down to a few hundred meter to the north. At c. 11:30, the northern advance had been contained, but the Greek positions were attacked in the rear by armed locals; in the town, a Greek patrol was shot at from civilian buildings. As a result, Sermakezis left only a few second-line men to guard the barracks and deployed his entire remaining force to defend the perimeter around the town. Most importantly he sent his cavalry force to reinforce the small bridge garrison, and a detachment of 45 men to block the road towards Menemen. The capture of Old Bergama towards the afternoon placed the Greek detachment in jeopardy, and its commander decided to withdraw under cover of night.

The withdrawal began at 21:30, and initially proceeded smoothly, until the noise caused by the pack animals was perceived by the Turks, who began firing in the direction of the Greek column. This caused panic, and the detachment hastily and in great disorder abandoned much of its heavy equipment. The detachment arrived at the bridge, where it was reunited with its cavalry, and towards midnight made for Menemen. Half-way to Menemen, at the village of Ali Agha, at c. 11:30, the retreating detachment met with the reinforcements coming from Menemen (1 infantry and 1 machine-gun company, as well as the 8th Cretan Regiment's headquarters company). Nevertheless, after leaving two companies as a rear guard, the detachment continued its retreat to Menemen. The Greek forces advancing from Dikili towards Bergama likewise withdrew once the abandonment of the town became known.

The detachment suffered 1 officer and 9 other ranks dead, 1 officer and 8 other ranks wounded, but also 86 other ranks missing in action. When the Greek forces returned in the area they found most of the missing soldiers mutilated in the outskirts of the city. The Inter-Allied Commission reported that Turkish irregulars had killed Turkish residents who welcomed the Greeks and had massacred and frequently tortured Greek prisoners.

The Circassian chief Hamit Çavuş, "a sworn enemy of the Turks and a protector of the Greeks", appeared "like a deus ex machina" to guide the temporarily retreating Greek troops towards Menemen along unfamiliar paths in order to save the force. He was seriously wounded in fighting against a Turkish çete force, but ultimately managed to guide the Greeks to Menemen successfully. The retreating Greek troops from Bergama finally arrived at Menemen on 22:00 of 16 June. During their retreat, they lost most of the pack animals and their supplies, and were attacked periodically by Turkish cavalry and armed peasants. The detachment also faced armed opposition by Ottoman authorities in Menemen. General Konstantinos Nider at Smyrna ordered the 6th Archipelago Regiment from Dikili and from Menemen a mixed detachment under Col. Mavroudis, comprising the 5th Archipelago Regiment, a cavalry battalion and artillery. After landing at Dikili on the 16th, the 6th Regiment began its march to Bergama on the 18th, and after overcoming some resistance set up camp. At 4:00 on the 19th, both Greek columns began their final march on Bergama. They faced a force about 1,000 strong with 4–6 machine guns, deployed on the heights southwest of the town.

At around 6:15, the 6th Regiment met the first Turkish resistance at Ralli-Chiflik, which continued until 14:00. In the meantime, however, Col. Tseroulis had sent another column to capture the bridge over the Bakırçay river that clashed with the Turks around noon. A further two companies were sent to cut off the road towards Soma, and these two became engaged in a heavy firefight after 10:00. Nevertheless, by 13:00 Tseroulis managed to capture the heights to the north of the town, thus effectively encircling it, as the Menemen column under Mavroudis arrived at the bridge at 14:00 and united with Tseroulis' men fighting there. The Turkish forces were pushed back halfway to Soma, where the front stabilized. The Greeks finally retook Bergama on 20 June.

== Aftermath ==
Bergama remained under Greek occupation until 1922.

== Sources ==
- Allamani, Efi & Panagiotopoulou, Krista (1978). "Ἡ Μικρασιατικὴ ἐκστρατεία ἁπὸ τὸ Μάιο τοῡ 1919 ὣς τὸ Νοέμβριο τοῡ 1920" [The Asia Minor campaign from May 1919 to November 1920]. In Christopoulos, Georgios A. & Bastias, Ioannis K. (eds.). Ιστορία του Ελληνικού Έθνους [History of the Greek Nation] (in Greek). Vol. ΙΕ: Νεώτερος Ελληνισμός από το 1913 έως το 1941 [Modern Hellenism from 1913 to 1941]. Athens: Ekdotiki Athinon. pp. 116–144. ISBN 978-960-213-111-4.
- Ἐπίτομος ἱστορία τῆς εἰς Μικράν Ἀσίαν Ἐκστρατείας 1919-1922 [Concise History of the Campaign in Asia Minor 1919–1922] (in Greek). Athens: Hellenic Army History Directorate. 1967.
- "Πέργαμος". Μεγάλη Στρατιωτικὴ καὶ Ναυτικὴ Ἐγκυκλοπαιδεία. Tόμος Πέμπτος: Νάβα–Σαρακηνοί [Great Military and Naval Encyclopaedia. Volume V: Nave–Saracens] (in Greek). Athens: Ἔκδοσις Μεγάλης Στρατιωτικῆς καὶ Ναυτικῆς Ἐγκυκλοπαιδείας. 1930. pp. 294–296. OCLC 31255024.
