= Aristeidis Chasapidis =

Greek Army officer (c. 1875–c. 1941)

- Αριστείδης Χασαπίδης
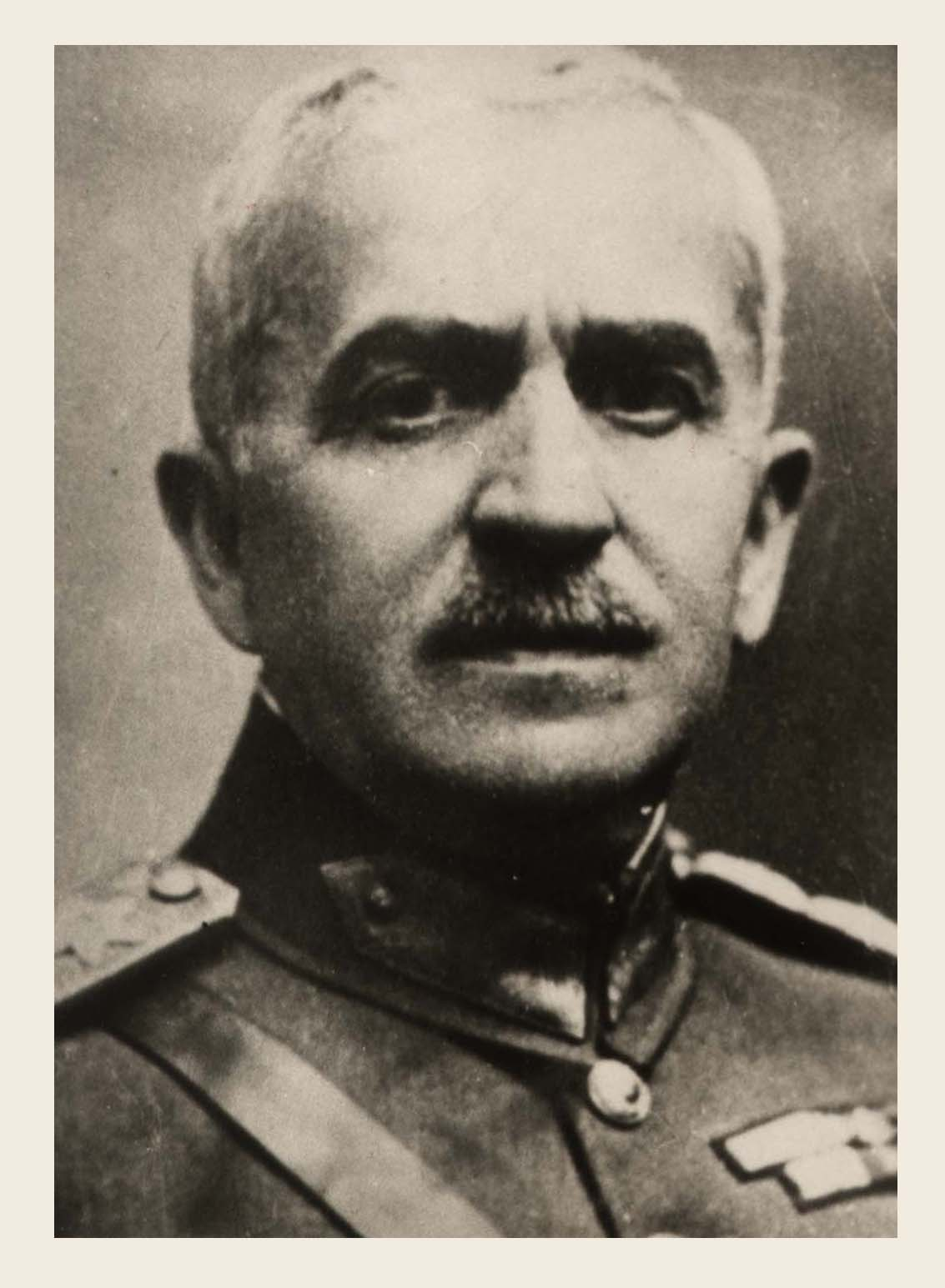
- Chasapidis c. 1936
- Born: 3 January 1875; Rentina, Kingdom of Greece
- Died: c. 1941; Athens, Hellenic State
- Military career
- Allegiance: Kingdom of Greece; Second Hellenic Republic
- Branch: Hellenic Army
- Service years: 1896–1936
- Rank: Lieutenant General
- Commands: 3rd Infantry Division (company commander); 9th Infantry Division (operations officer); 2nd Infantry Division (Chief of Staff); I Army Corps; II Army Corps (10th and 8th divisions); Chief of the Hellenic Army General Staff
- Conflicts: Greco-Turkish War (1897); Balkan Wars; First Balkan War; Second Balkan War; World War I; Macedonian front; Russian Civil War; Allied intervention in the Russian Civil War; Southern Front; Southern Russia Intervention; Greco-Turkish War of 1919–22; Greek Retreat

Aristeidis Chasapidis (Greek: Αριστείδης Χασαπίδης, 1875–1941) was a Hellenic Army officer who reached the rank of lieutenant general and served as Chief of the Hellenic Army General Staff in 1935–36.

== Life ==
Aristeidis Chasapidis was born on 3 January 1875 in the village of Rentina in Thessaly, then part of the Ottoman Empire. He enlisted in the Hellenic Army as a volunteer on 7 October 1896, and fought in the Greco-Turkish War of 1897 as a non-commissioned officer. He then attended the NCO School graduating on 26 July 1906 as a second lieutenant of infantry.

Promoted to lieutenant in 1912, he fought in the Balkan Wars of 1912–13 as a company commander in the 3rd Infantry Division's 10th Infantry Regiment. He was then promoted to captain in 1913 and major in 1916.

With Greece's formal entry into World War I in 1917, he was operations officer of the 9th Infantry Division, while in 1918 he was promoted to lieutenant colonel and assigned as chief of staff of the 2nd Infantry Division. He retained this post for the next four years, during the division's service in Ukraine as part of the Southern Russia Intervention (1919), and later in Anatolia during the Greco-Turkish War of 1919–22. He particularly distinguished himself during the decisive Turkish offensive in August 1922, where he repelled the Turkish attacks on his sector. During the subsequent Greek retreat to the Aegean shore, he served as chief of staff of I Army Corps and of Major General Athanasios Frangou's Southern Group of Divisions.

Following the evacuation from Anatolia, he immediately joined the 11 September 1922 Revolution, becoming again chief of staff of I Corps and member of the 12-man Revolutionary Committee, under the chairmanship of Colonel Stylianos Gonatas, which demanded the led the army to Athens and secured the abdication of the government of Petros Protopapadakis and of King Constantine I. Promoted to full colonel in 1923 and major general in 1928, he served as commander of the 10th and the 8th divisions and of II Army Corps. In 1934 he was promoted to lieutenant general, assuming the post of Chief of the Hellenic Army General Staff in 1935, until his retirement in 1936.

He died in 1941.

Military offices
Preceded by Lt. General Dimitrios Katheniotis	Chief of the Hellenic Army General Staff; March 1935 – July 1936	Succeeded by Lt. General Alexandros Papagos
