= Republic of Pontus =

1919 proposed Greek state on the Black Sea

Republic of Pontus Δημοκρατία του Πόντου
- Flag

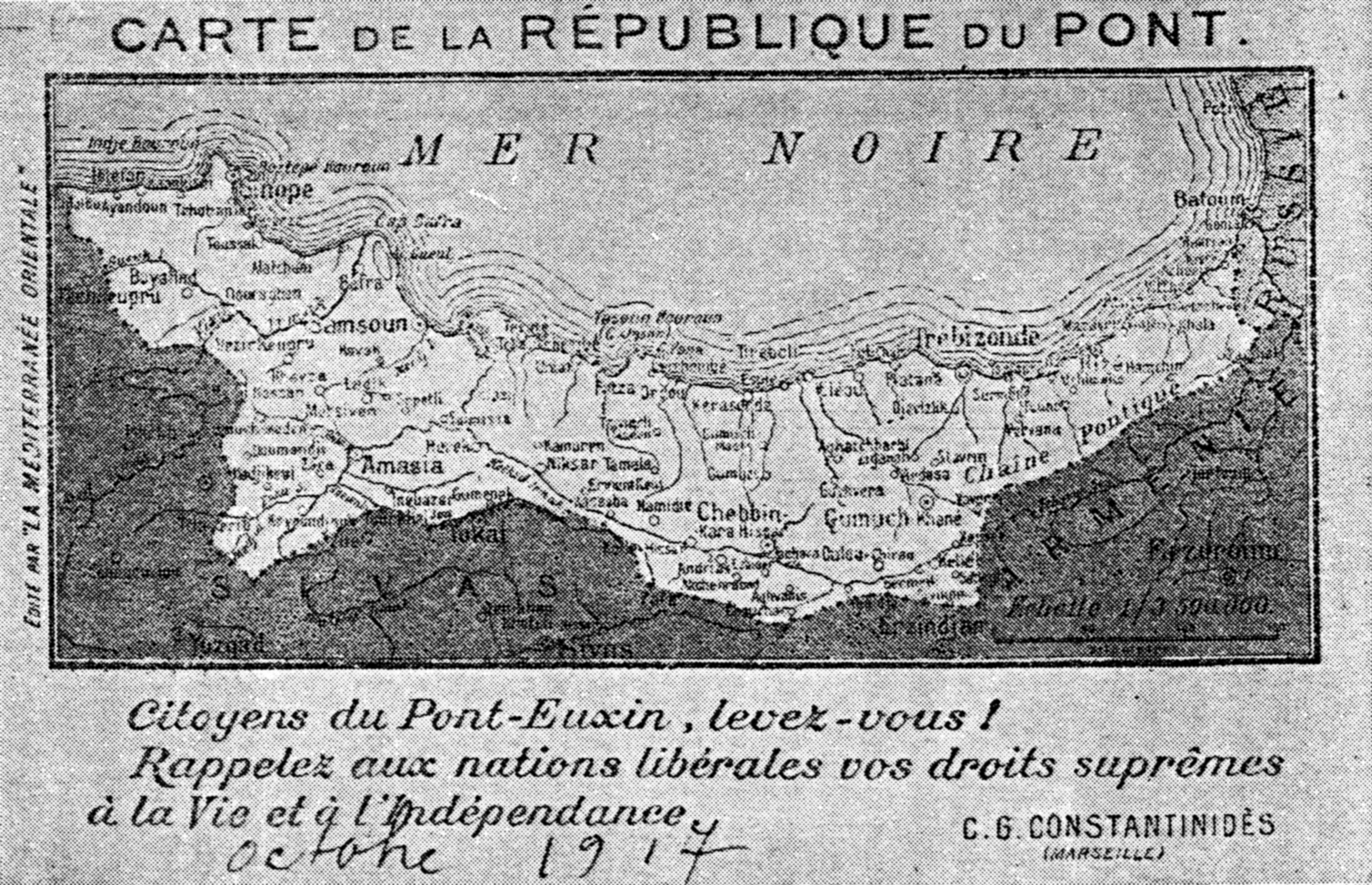
- Capital: Trebizond
- Common languages: Pontic Greek; Minority languages: Turkish, Armenian, Laz
- Religion: Orthodox Christianity
- Government: Republic

The Republic of Pontus (Greek: Δημοκρατία του Πόντου, Dimokratía tou Póntou) was a proposed Pontic Greek state on the southern coast of the Black Sea. Its territory would have covered much of historical Pontus in north-eastern Asia Minor. Today it forms part of Turkey's Black Sea Region.

== History ==
=== Background ===
Greek colonies were established on the Pontus coast in 800 BC, and by the time of the conquests of Alexander the Great the local inhabitants were already heavily Hellenized. By the 4th century AD, Greek had become the sole spoken language in the region, and it would remain so for a thousand years, first under the Byzantine Empire and then the Empire of Trebizond, a Byzantine successor state. In 1461 the Ottoman Empire conquered Pontus, but the remote mountainous region remained predominately Greek speaking for centuries more.

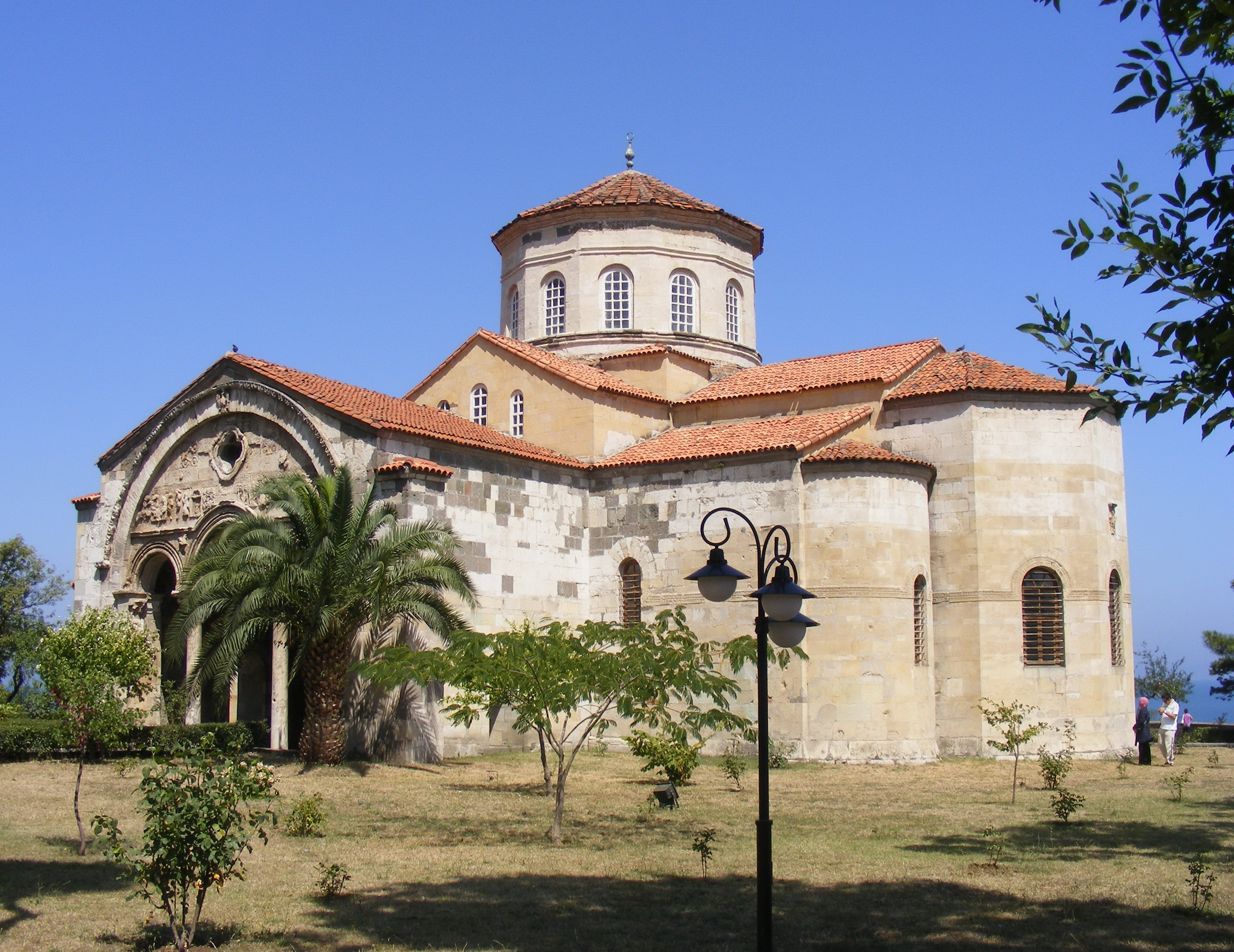
Hagia Sophia of Trebizond

In the early 1830s, the modern Greek state achieved independence, but with less territory than it holds today. Megali Idea made further claims on Greek-populated territories elsewhere. The Pontic Greeks were far from the new Greek state, and had few connections to it, so joining the new Greece was never strongly considered. At that time, many Pontic Greeks migrated to the much closer Orthodox states of Russia and Georgia.

In 1904, a secret society, the Pontus Society, was founded in Merzifon whose main purpose was achieving an independent republic of Pontus. The movement gained significant support and during the 1910s and 1920s, the Metropolitan of Trabzon Chrysanthos Filippides, who would later become the Archbishop of Athens, became a major leader in pushing for an independent Republic of Pontus. International societies of Pontic Greeks became connected with the Pontus Society in Merzifon and began significant lobbying efforts to push for an independent Pontic Greek state: most prominently in Russia and the United States. During this period, Leonidas Iasonidis became a primary leader in the movement for the establishment of a Republic of Pontus.

=== World War I ===
In 1916, during World War I, Trabzon fell to the forces of the Russian Empire, fomenting the idea of an independent Pontic state. With the Russian Revolution, Russian forces withdrew from the region to take part in the Russian Civil War (1917–1923).

Like Armenians, Assyrians and other Ottoman Greeks, the Greeks of Trebizond province suffered a genocide at the beginning of the 20th century, first by the Young Turks and later by Kemalist forces. In both cases, motivation was the fear of the Turks on losing the territory sooner or later to the local indigenous populations of Greeks, Assyrians and Armenians and the policy of Turkification. Death marches through Turkey's mountainous terrain, forced labour in the infamous "Labour battalions" in Anatolia and slaughter by the irregular bands of Topal Osman resulted in approximately 350,000 of Pontic Greeks perishing from 1914 to 1922. The Greek population of the city itself was however not targeted directly, as the local authorities refused to supply Topal with weapons, and local Turks forced his band out of the city. The local Muslims of the city protested the arrest of prominent Christians.

Pontic Greeks that escaped the death marches went on to the mountains with women and children, and formed self-defense groups that were protecting the Greek and Armenian population, until the population agreement exchange in 1923. The self-defense groups are believed to have saved the lives of more than 60 thousand Pontic Greeks and Armenians.

On January 8, 1918, U.S. President Woodrow Wilson enunciated his Fourteen Points towards a post-war order. Point Twelve specified that the non-Turkish nationalities "which are now under Turkish rule should be assured an undoubted security of life and an absolutely unmolested opportunity of autonomous development." This declaration led to significant activity to organize on the part of non-Turkish populations throughout Anatolia, including the Pontus region. In July 1918, a congress of Greek representatives from southern Russia, Transcaucasia, and Pontus was convened in Baku. It proclaimed the independence of Pontus and elected a seven-member council, under whose authority all Pontic associations were placed. In November 1918, the large conference of Pontic organizations convened in Paris.

In 1918–1919, Greek Prime Minister Eleftherios Venizelos began a process of financial payment for repatriation of Pontic Greeks who had resettled in Russia during the violence before and during World War I. In May 1919, the head of the Greek Red Cross for the Pontus region wrote a report indicating that security for the population was very precarious and assistance was necessary.

Following the Armistice of Mudros which ended World War I hostilities between the Allied powers and the Ottoman Empire, British troops landed in Samsun and occupied much of the region.

=== Appeal in the Paris Peace Conference ===
Chrysanthos arrived at the Paris Peace Conference on 29 April 1919 to push for an independent Pontus, presenting an 18-page memorandum in support of the Republic's establishment. The proposed state was to include the districts of Trabzon, Samsun, Sinop, and Amasya, covering much of the northeast Black Sea region of modern Turkey. Chrysanthos won some outside support: U.S. President Woodrow Wilson said he would vote for the Republic's independence, and André Tardieu backed it as well; Georges Clemenceau said he would do the same if Wilson did.

Armenian claims to Trabzon collided against Pontic Greek demands for an autonomous or independent Pontus. At the conference, Chrysanthos tried to work out some form of cooperation with the Armenian delegation. The Armenians acknowledged that the Vilayet of Trebizond had been the seat of the Kingdom of Pontus and that its Greek population was certainly predominant over the Armenian one, but they argued that Trebizond's port was crucial as an outlet to the Black Sea for the Armenian plateau. Greek opinion mostly ran toward an independent Pontus or some kind of confederation with Armenia, while Armenians preferred a unitary Armenian state with autonomy granted to the Pontic Greeks. Nevertheless, both Greek and Armenian officials were united in believing that the issue could be resolved by adequate guarantees for an autonomous administration in Pontus.

After consulting with Venizelos, Chrysanthos met Wilson on 16 May 1919 with Venizelos's full approval and agreement on the approach he would take. Chrysanthos raised the possibility of an American mandate, or, alternatively, a Greek one, for Pontus, gaining Wilson's support. French delegate André Tardieu backed the plan as well, while Clemenceau told Greek diplomat Athos Romanos that he would support the Pontic Greeks, if Wilson did the same. Despite this, the Greek delegation kept looking for a compromise with Armenia.

=== Negotiations with the First Republic of Armenia ===
In December 1919, Chrysanthos and Greek diplomat Ioannis Stavridakis went to Tiflis and Yerevan to negotiate. The Pontic delegation proposed a federation of two separate autonomous entities. Armenian Prime Minister Alexander Khatisian proposed Pontus to enter Armenia, but with autonomy and its own parliament, keeping the Armenian state formally unitary. Customs, postal and telegraph services, and other shared institutions were also discussed. The talks continued in Yerevan from 10 to 16 January 1920. Khatisian sent Chrysanthos a confidential letter on 10 January and another from Tiflis on 16 January, and on that day the two men jointly appealed to Venizelos and to the Armenian and Pontic delegations at the conference. Chrysanthos told Venizelos afterward that the Armenian government considered the final settlement dependent on the Armenian delegation's position in Paris. By then, both sides were pushing a Greek landing at Trabzon.

The two sides agreed in principle to a Pontic Greek–Armenian confederation, while leaving the precise degree of federalisation open. The agreement provided that each constituent state would keep its own parliament, laws, ministries, and regular army, while military forces would fall under a common commander and war ministry. In addition, foreign policy, commerce, industry, customs, currency, and postal and telegraph services would be handled jointly, while religion, education, and the gendarmerie stayed with each state. Pontus's portion of the federation was to include the Trabzon Vilayet, covering Samsun, Amasya, Sinop, and Karahisar. A military agreement accompanied the political one, with Greek and Armenian forces agreeing to cooperate against anyone threatening the arrangement. Greek troops under Dimitrios Katheniotis would land at Trabzon and push toward Erzurum as the Armenian army advanced on it from the other side.

=== Negotiations with the Allies and initial abandonment ===
In February 1920, the Entente refused to cede Trabzon to Armenia, believing it to be "politically and ethnographically problematic". Katheniotis went to London hoping for British backing for a Republic of Pontus under Greek mandate, but found none. The San Remo Conference refused Trabzon to Armenia again in April, and, afterwards, Chrysanthos and other Pontic representatives proposed an autonomous Pontus within Turkey, governed by someone appointed by the League of Nations, as a last resort.

In May, Venizelos told the Greek parliament that an independent Pontus could not be realized. He recalled that his earlier idea was a League of Nations mandate for Armenia and Pontus leading into a federation, and blamed its failure partly on the populations involved rejecting it and partly on the Pontic representatives' own failure to negotiate properly with Armenia.

=== Revival and final abandonment ===
The subject was revived in June. Venizelos told Greek diplomat Nikolaos Politis on 15 June that if Greece had to enforce the peace settlement by force, he hoped that its terms could be revised to allow for a federation between Pontus and Armenia. David Lloyd George then invited Venizelos to London and put Greece in charge of enforcing the Allied settlement against the Ankara government. The successful Greek Summer Offensive that followed encouraged the Pontic representatives to take up the campaign for independence again.

The Athens Pontus Committee sent Venizelos a memorandum on 7 July offering 20,000 men for an advance along the Samsun–Sivas road. Three days later, representatives Constantine Constantinides and Socrate Oeconomos told the French Foreign Ministry they were still seeking full independence, while promising good relations and assistance to Armenia. Venizelos told his deputy Emmanouil Repoulis on 29 July that Greece would keep any territory occupied beyond the treaty's terms for as long as Turkey threatened Armenia, and, days later, assured Constantinides that if Turkey failed to implement the treaty, Greece would occupy Pontus with three or four divisions.

The Treaty of Sèvres was signed on 10 August. Under Article 89, the frontier between Turkey and Armenia in the provinces of Erzurum, Trabzon, Van, and Bitlis was to be determined by arbitration. The next day, on 11 August, Venizelos got Armenia to formally drop its claim to Trabzon, in return for a Greek commitment to keep fighting in western Anatolia and hold occupied territory as long as Armenia remained under threat. On 17 August, Aharonian told the Greek government that Armenia wanted to send an ambassador to Athens. Athens planned to reciprocate in Yerevan.

Pontic Greek lobbyists in the United States appealed to Wilson on 21 September, this time asking for Trabzon's union with Greece rather than an independent Pontus. The Turkish invasion of Armenia began three days later, on 24 September, and Armenia appealed to the Allies for a Greek occupation of Trabzon. British diplomat Andrew Ryan and Admiral John de Robeck both supported it. On 5 October, Venizelos proposed a planned operation to Lloyd George, in which the Greek Army destroy Turkish forces at Ankara and Trabzon, then establish a Republic of Pontus, which, together with the Democratic Republic of Georgia and the First Republic of Armenia, would serve as a barrier against both the Turkish National Movement and the Bolsheviks. After the war, the Republic would likely be integrated with Greece, whose borders would stretch all the way to Ankara. The new Pontic state would be built from the Trebizond vilayet, excluding the Lazistan sanjak, together with the sanjaks of Sinope, Amasya, Tokat and Karahisar. The British Cabinet discussed the proposal on 12 October. Lloyd George agreed, but others feared French and Italian objections, so the cabinet put the matter off for later. Venizelos sent the plan's details to Greek diplomat Dimitrios Kaklamanos that same day. The plan was for Greek troops to push through to Ankara and move onto Pontus within a month.

The Turkish invasion of Armenia in September 1920 and its final offensive in November 1920 coincided with the Soviet invasion of Armenia and crushed the First Republic of Armenia, ending what remained of Pontic Greek-Armenian cooperation. Venizelos's defeat in that same month's elections in Greece finished off the idea of an independent Republic of Pontus alongside it. After the electoral defeat, Dimitrios Katheniotis wrote in a 26 November 1920 letter to Venizelos about a British proposal to establish a Greek expeditionary force of approximately 15,000 men for military operations in Pontus, without the official involvement of the Greek government. The proposed force would initially draw personnel from Greek military classes and subsequently be reinforced through the mobilization of Pontic Greeks, under the command of experienced Venizelist officers. Katheniotis expressed his willingness to serve in the British Army of the Black Sea and participate in the proposed operation, which was never carried out. He also defended Venizelos's handling of the issue, maintaining that he had done everything he could to secure the establishment of a Republic of Pontus.

In 1921 large part of the Orthodox Christian males of Pontus were deported and sent to labour battalions at Erzerum. During this time an "Ad hoc Court of Turkish Independence" in Amasya, which was controlled by the Turkish nationalists of Mustafa Kemal (later Atatürk), sentenced several notable figures to death by hanging. Among them was the former member of the Ottoman parliament, Matthaios Kofidis. They were charged of supporting the independence movement of Pontus.

=== Aftermath and reactions ===
The Republic never came into existence. The Pontic Greek population was massacred and expelled from Turkey after 1922, and resettled in the Soviet Union or in Greece. The population exchange between Greece and Turkey in 1923 formally recognized this displacement. In modern Greek political circles, the exchange is seen as inseparable from the wider Greek genocide.

A large part of the Pontic Greek community resettled during the fighting and after the Treaty of Lausanne in 1923, as part of the Greek and Turkish population exchange. Records find that 182,169 Pontic Greeks were displaced as part of the population exchange. Many of the Pontic Greeks left for the Soviet Union, which had been the site of earlier Pontic migrations and thus had family connections. Most of the rest migrated to Greece (mostly to Greek Macedonia) where they were given full citizenship rights (Pontic Greeks who migrate from Russia today receive similar privileges). In Greece the Pontic migrants were called Póndii.

After the war, Venizelists argued that, had the Royalists not won the November 1920 elections, the Entente would have "supported the liberation of Pontus by the Division of Dimitrios Katheniotis". Author Penelope Delta later wrote in her diary: "Thus, for the sake of the party, out of stubbornness, [the people of mainland Greece] refused to enter Constantinople, to hold a service in Hagia Sophia, and missed the opportunity to liberate Pontus".

== Demographics ==
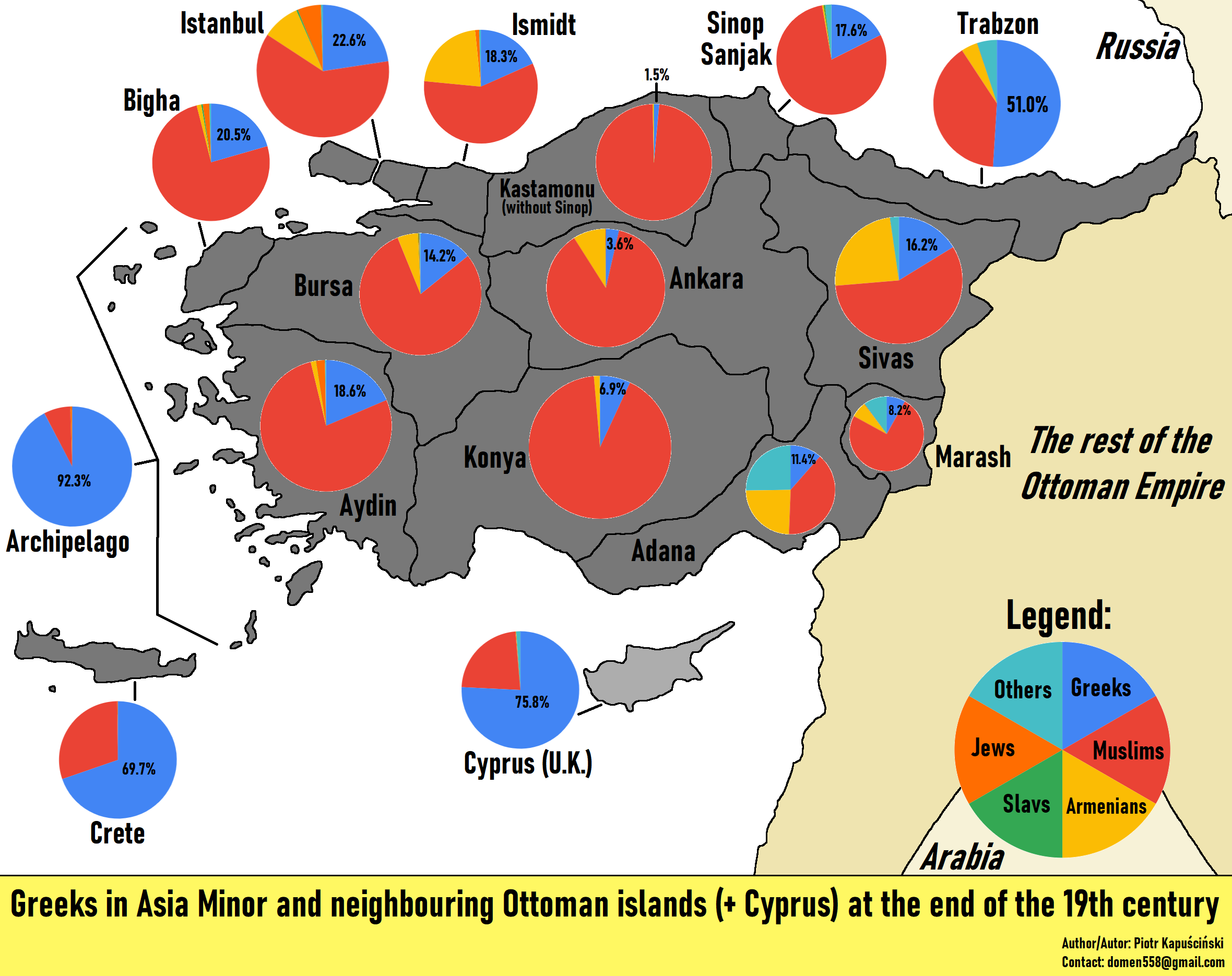
Greeks in Asia Minor at the end of the 19th century

An Ottoman statistical report in 1914 recorded the Greek population (excluding the Greek Muslims) at no more than 350,000, around 17% of the population; though there are no accurate statistics for the population of Greeks in the Ottoman Empire, with figures compiled by Ottoman authorities being deemed unreliable, in particular for Ottoman Greeks who tended to avoid registering with Muslim authorities to avoid military service and to minimize their taxes. According to the statistics of the Ecumenical Patriarchate of Constantinople, the Greek population of Pontus prior of World War I, was 650,000. Likewise, an official report by the Greek Ministry of Foreign Affairs at the time, wrote that the Greek population was 700,000 prior of WWI; a number that was officially recognized by the Ottoman government of Kâmil Pasha in 1912, when after having reached an agreement with the Patriarchate, the number of parliamentary seats for the Greeks of Pontus was set at 7 (or 1 Greek MP for every 100,000 inhabitants). Sergei Rudolfovich Mintslov published a survey in 1916, stating that the regions of Platana and Trabzon were 32.4% Greeks. In a memorandum signed in February 1919, and presented to the Paris Peace Conference, a local Greek delegation calling for the self-determination of Pontus, stated that the pre-genocide Greek population of Pontus was 700,000, without counting an additional 350,000 who fled Turkish persecution several years prior; Pontus also had minorities of Turks, Circassians, Armenians, Tartars and Turcomans.

== See also ==
- Pontus
- Black Sea Region
- Caucasus Greeks
- Wilsonian Armenia
- Greek genocide
- Greek refugees

== Sources ==
- Aharonian, Avetis; Nubar, Boghos (1919). The Armenian Question Before the Peace Conference. New York: Press Bureau, the Armenian National Union of America.
- Alexandris, Alexis (1980). "Η ανάπτυξη του εθνικού πνεύματος των Ελλήνων του Πόντου, 1918–1922: Ελληνική εξωτερική πολιτική και τουρκική αντίδραση" [The Development of the National Consciousness of the Greeks of Pontus, 1918–1922: Greek Foreign Policy and the Turkish Reaction]. In Veremis, Thanos; Dimitrakopoulos, Orestes (eds.). Μελετήματα γύρω από τον Βενιζέλο και την εποχή του (in Greek). Athens: Φιλιππότης. pp. 427–474.
- Bilgiç, Bestami S. (2011). "A Failed Project: The Ponto-Armenian Federation, 1919–1920". Belleten. 75 (273): 545–570. doi:10.37879/belleten.2011.545. hdl:20.500.12428/13299.
- Dinçel, Yusuf (2026). "The Turkish–Greek War (1919–1922) in Light of Archival Documents". Nuova Rivista Storica. 110 (1): 113–140. doi:10.32604/nrs.2026.077200.
- Frazier to Colby (Report). Athens: U.S. Department of State. 14 May 1920. File No. 763.72119/9863.
- Hassiotis, I. K. (2012). "Greek foreign policy towards the Armenian Question: a historical survey". Byzantine and Modern Greek Studies. 36 (2): 215–233. doi:10.1179/0307013112Z.00000000013.
- Hassiotis, Ioannis K. (1985). "Shared Illusions: Greek–Armenian Co-operation in Asia Minor and the Caucasus (1917–1922)". Greece and Great Britain During World War I. Thessaloniki: Institute for Balkan Studies. pp. 139–192.
- Hovannisian, Richard G. (1996). The Republic of Armenia, Vol. III: From London to Sèvres, February–August 1920. Berkeley: University of California Press. ISBN 0-520-08803-4.
- Lampsidis, Odysseus (2002). "Προσπάθειες στρατιωτικής οργανώσεως των Ελληνοποντίων (25 Απριλίου 1919–5 Απριλίου 1920): Νέα έκδοση της εκθέσεως Δ. Καθενιώτη" [Attempts to Organise the Pontic Greeks Militarily (25 April 1919–5 April 1920): New Edition of the Report of D. Katheniotis]. Δωδώνη. Ιστορία και Αρχαιολογία (in Greek). 31. University of Ioannina: 5–222.
- Petsalis-Diomidis, N. (1972). "Hellenism in Southern Russia and the Ukrainian campaign: their effect on the Pontus question (1919)". Balkan Studies. 13 (2): 221–263.
- Yavuz, Bige Sükan (March 2003). "Kurtuluş Savaşı Sırasında Kurulması Düşünülen Rum–Ermeni Konfederasyonu" [The Rum–Armenian Confederation Considered During the War of Independence]. Atatürk Araştırma Merkezi Dergisi (in Turkish). 19 (55): 17–40.
- Yerasimos, Stéphane (1989). "La question du Pont-Euxin (1912–1923)". Guerres mondiales et conflits contemporains (153). Presses Universitaires de France: 9–34.
