= Archipelago Division =

Archipelago Division Μεραρχία Ἀρχιπελάγους
- Active: September 1916 – November 1920
- Country: Kingdom of Greece
- Branch: Hellenic Army
- Type: infantry
- Size: Division
- Engagements: World War I: Macedonian front; Battle of Skra-di-Legen; Vardar Offensive; Battle of Dobro Pole; Greco-Turkish War of 1919-1922: Battle of Bergama; 1920 summer offensive
- Battle honours: Capture of: Akhisar; Kırkağaç; Soma; Balikesir; Bursa

The Archipelago Division (Greek: Μεραρχία Ἀρχιπελάγους, romanized: Merarchia Archipelagous) was an infantry division of Greece in World War I and the early stages of the Asia Minor Campaign.

== Establishment ==
The division began being raised in September 1916 by the Provisional Government of National Defence, as part of its efforts to create its own army for service alongside the Allies on the Macedonian front. Initial planning called for the establishment of four infantry divisions to be recruited in the areas controlled by the National Defence government (Crete, the Aegean islands, and Macedonia).

As its name signifies, the Archipelago Division (Μεραρχία Ἀρχιπελάγους) was recruited in the Aegean islands, chiefly Chios, Lesbos, and Samos. Its core were men already serving in the islands, as well as the classes of 1915 and 1916; this proved insufficient to complete recruitment, and in March 1917 eight older classes were mobilized to fill the division's ranks. Further difficulties were encountered due to the lack of weapons and qualified NCOs, leading to the establishment of an NCO training centre in Mytilini. The division comprised three infantry regiments (originally the 7th, 8th, and 9th, but in late 1916 renumbered 4th, 5th, and 6th respectively) and support services. The 4th Archipelago Regiment (4ο Σύνταγμα Ἀρχιπελάγους) with two battalions was headquartered at Lesbos, the 5th Archipelago Regiment (5ο Σύνταγμα Ἀρχιπελάγους) with one battalion at Lesbos and one at Lemnos, and the 6th Archipelago Regiment (6ο Σύνταγμα Ἀρχιπελάγους) at Samos, with one battalion at Chios. Its first commander was Colonel (later Major General and Lt. General) Dimitrios Ioannou, with Lt. Colonel Dimitrios Katheniotis as his chief of staff.

Among the men recruited into the division was the writer Stratis Myrivilis, whose anti-war novel Life in the Tomb describes life on the Macedonian front based on the author's own experiences with the division.

== Macedonian front, 1917–1918 ==
=== First front deployment at Monastir ===
After training was completed in March 1917, the division was ferried to Toumba in Thessaloniki in April. From 1 May on, it began its move to the front, and by 18 May 1917 the division had assembled around the village of Kladorachi in the Florina area, and placed under the command of the French Armée d'Orient. There the division was trained in trench warfare and the use of mortars, handgrenades, etc.

From 24 May, the division's battalions began occupying front sectors in the Monastir area, under the control of the French 57th Infantry Division: one each of the battalions were attached to the French division's regiments to gradually accustom them to front conditions. By July, the division held its own continuous front sector. In August 1917, Lt. Colonel Achilleas Protosyngellos took over as the division's chief of staff.

=== Battle of Skra ===
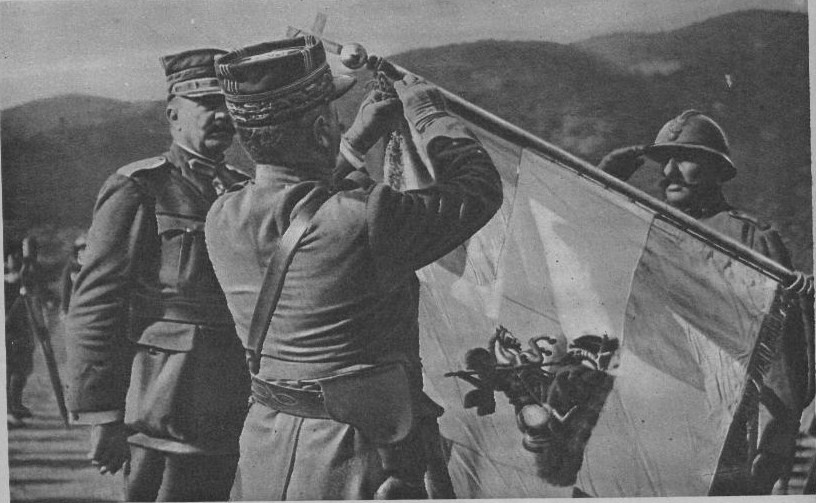
Allied commander-in-chief Louis Franchet d'Espérey decorates the battle flag of the 5th Archipelago Regiment in 1918, with the divisional commander Dimitrios Ioannou to his left

On 20 October the division was moved east to the Polykastro–Goumenissa area, where it took over a front sector adjoining the Crete Division to its right. Along with the Serres Division, these formed the "National Defence Army Corps" under Major General Emmanouil Zymvrakakis, although operationally the Greek divisions came under the 1st Group of Divisions, under Auguste Clément Gérôme, commander of the French 122nd Infantry Division.

The division held this sector until May 1918, when it participated in the Battle of Skra-di-Legen. The Archipelago Division with its 5th and 6th regiments (Lt. Colonels Efthymios Tsimikalis and Konstantinos Exarchakis respectively), reinforced with the 1st Serres Regiment (Lt. Colonel Georgios Kondylis), took the brunt of the attack on the fortified positions of Skra on 16–18 May 1918, aided on its flanks by attacks from the Crete and Serres divisions.

Following its victory at Skra, the Archipelago Division was withdrawn to the village of Karpi near Goumenissa on 20 May for rest. On 10 July it replaced the Crete Division at the front in the Loumnitsa sector, again under the 1st Group of Divisions under Philippe Henri Joseph d'Anselme. The division took over the 29th Infantry Regiment as the third divisional regiment, since the 4th Archipelago Regiment remained in southern Greece assigned to internal security duties.

=== Vardar Offensive and end of the war ===
During the Vardar Offensive in September 1918, the 1st Group of Divisions was assigned a supporting role, connecting the two main prongs of the Allied attack, while pinning down its opposing forces through an attack along the Vardar valley to the Demir Kapija gorge. The Archipelago Division was tasked with supporting the French 16th Colonial Infantry Division towards Davidovo. As the Bulgarian retreat began on 8 September, the division crossed the trenches on 9 September, and advanced through Strumica to Plačkovica.

Following the Armistice of Salonica on 16 September, the division assembled at Kočani on 23 September and then at Tsarevo Selo, under the reconstituted National Defence Army Corps. Along with the rest of the corps, on 29 October the division was moved to the Gevgelija–Axioupolis area as a reserve of the Allied commander-in-chief. From there the division moved to Langadas on 9 November, and to eastern Macedonia in December. In October–November 1918, the division was commanded by Colonel Manganaras, before Major General Periklis Pierrakos-Mavromichalis.

== Asia Minor, 1919–1920 ==
=== Piecemeal arrival and first operations at Bergama ===
The Archipelago Division remained in eastern Macedonia until May 1919, when it was shipped to Asia Minor to take up occupation duties in the Smyrna Zone. The 6th Archipelago Regiment was sent in early May, soon after the Greek landing at Smyrna, to augment the 1st Infantry Division there, and the 5th Regiment followed later in the month. The Greek occupation immediately faced armed resistance by irregular forces, and was hampered due to political considerations: as the Smyrna Zone was still officially Ottoman territory, Turkish officials remained in place, censorship was not imposed, and even the disarming of the civilian population (including demobilized Ottoman soldiers) was prohibited by the Allies. The rapid growth of organized resistance emerged into the open with the events of the Battle of Bergama, necessitating the dispatch of the 5th and 6th Archipelago Regiments to recapture Bergama on 7 June.

The problems faced by the Greek forces in Asia Minor resulted in a first wave of reinforcements, including the rest of the Arcipelago Division. On 18 June 1919 Colonel (later Major General) Charalambos Tseroulis assumed command of the division, which now held the northernmost part of the Greek occupation zone around Bergama and Ayvalık. In late July 1919, the Archipelago Division numbered on paper 340 officers and 8,421 other ranks, of which about 9.5% were missing or otherwise not available.

=== On occupation duty, July 1919 – May 1920 ===
At the same time, the Allies strictly forbade the Greek troops to advance beyond the area already occupied, unless with prior Allied consent. As this allowed the Turks to launch raids against the Greek lines and then retreat with impunity behind the demarcation line, this was modified on 29 August so that Greek forces could pursue them to 1–1.5 km, on 28 September to the freedom to make minor and local advances to improve their tactical position, and on 16 October to pursue Turkish forces up to 3 km from the demarcation line. A final demarcation line was determined by the Allied leaders in November 1919, with Greek forces advancing to the new positions on 3 November. During this period, the Archipelago Division had only to contend with low-level activity by irregular forces, which cost it 2 killed and 15 wounded soldiers.

On 12 December, as the Greek forces in Asia Minor were grouped into the Army of Asia Minor, the division became part of the newly constituted Smyrna Army Corps under the division's former commander, Lt. General Ioannou. The division's sector remained relatively calm, except for occasional firefights and artillery shots during December, with almost complete quiet in the early months of 1920. In March–May 1920, the division suffered 14 dead and 21 wounded. The opposing Turkish forces, elements of the 56th and 61st divisions as well as irregulars, was estimated at around 10,000 men.

=== Summer offensive of 1920 ===
During the 1920 summer offensive, the division captured Akhisar, Kırkağaç, Soma, Balikesir, and Bursa, establishing defensive positions east of the latter.

=== Renaming ===
Following the victory of the royalist opposition in the 1920 Greek legislative election, on 10 November Tseroulis was replaced by Colonel Polychronis Karakalos, and on 24 December the division was renamed from its "Venizelist" name to the 7th Infantry Division.

== Casualties ==
During its front-line service from 1917 to 1920, the division suffered 139 officers killed or wounded, and 3,695 other ranks killed or wounded.

== Sources ==
- Ἐπίτομος ἱστορία τῆς εἰς Μικράν Ἀσίαν Ἐκστρατείας 1919-1922 [Concise History of the Campaign in Asia Minor 1919–1922] (in Greek). Athens: Hellenic Army History Directorate. 1967.
- Επίτομη ιστορία της συμμετοχής του Ελληνικού Στρατού στον Πρώτο Παγκόσμιο Πόλεμο 1914 - 1918 [Concise History of the Hellenic Army's Participation in the First World War 1914–1918] (in Greek). Athens: Hellenic Army History Directorate. 1993.
- Μεγάλη Στρατιωτικὴ καὶ Ναυτικὴ Ἐγκυκλοπαιδεία. Tόμος Τρίτος: Δαβατηνός–Ἰωσήφ [Great Military and Naval Encyclopaedia. Volume III: Davatinos–Joseph] (in Greek). Athens: Ἔκδοσις Μεγάλης Στρατιωτικῆς καὶ Ναυτικῆς Ἐγκυκλοπαιδείας. 1929. OCLC 31255024.
