= Efthymios Tsimikalis =

Greek Army officer (1879–1943)

- Ευθύμιος Τσιμικάλης
- Born: 17 June 1879; Agrinio, Kingdom of Greece
- Died: c. 1943; Hellenic State
- Education: Hellenic Military Academy
- Military career
- Allegiance: Kingdom of Greece; (Greece) Provisional Government of National Defence; (Greece) Second Hellenic Republic
- Branch: Hellenic Army
- Service years: 1900–1921; 1922–1925; 1926–1933
- Rank: Lieutenant General
- Commands: Crete Division; 10th Infantry Division; IV Army Corps
- Wars: Balkan Wars: First Balkan War; Battle of Sarantaporo; Second Balkan War; World War I: Macedonian front; Battle of Skra-di-Legen; Greco-Turkish War (1919-1922)
- Other work: Minister for the Interior; Finance Minister

Efthymios Tsimikalis (Greek: Ευθύμιος Τσιμικάλης, 1879–1943) was a Hellenic Army officer who rose to the rank of lieutenant general. He was particularly notable for this role in World War I and in the politics of the interwar period in Greece.

== Life ==
Efthymios Tsimikalis was born on 17 June 1879 in Agrinio. He entered the Hellenic Military Academy, graduating on 16 July 1900 as an Infantry 2nd Lieutenant. He then continued his studies for two years in France.

During the Balkan Wars of 1912–13 he served as company and battalion commander in the 6th Infantry Regiment, being wounded in the Battle of Sarantaporo. In August 1916 he joined Eleftherios Venizelos' Provisional Government of National Defence in Thessaloniki, and was charged with the formation of the 5th Regiment of the new Archipelago Division. Tsimikalis led the regiment to the front in May 1917, and fought with distinction in the Macedonian front, particularly in the Battle of Skra-di-Legen in May 1918, where the 5th Archipelago Regiment led the main assault on the Bulgarian positions.

Following victory at Skra, he was posted as garrison commander of Athens. In September 1920 he assumed command of the Crete Division, but following the electoral defeat of Venizelos in November 1920 he was dismissed in February 1921 and placed on suspended service. He was recalled to active service after the September 1922 Revolution, and commanded the 10th Infantry Division in the Army of the Evros (1922–23) and the IV Army Corps until 1925, when he was again suspended. Recalled to active service after the end of the dictatorship of Theodoros Pangalos, he held various corps and higher commands thereafter.

In March 1933 he was a member of the emergency "Government of the Lieutenant Generals" under Alexandros Othonaios, that assumed power to counter the abortive coup attempt led by Nikolaos Plastiras. He held the posts of Minister for the Interior (6–10 March) and Finance Minister (6–7 March).

He died in 1943.

A street is named in his honour in his home town of Agrinio.

Political offices
Preceded by Georgios Maris	Minister for the Interior of Greece; 6–10 March 1933	Succeeded by Ioannis Metaxas
Preceded by Georgios Kafantaris	Minister for Finance of Greece; 6–7 March 1933	Succeeded by Alexandros Koryzis
