= Charalambos Tseroulis =

Hellenic army officer (1879–1929)

- Χαράλαμπος Τσερούλης
- Born: 1 June 1879; Missolonghi, Kingdom of Greece
- Died: 2 May 1929; Second Hellenic Republic
- Education: Hellenic Military Academy
- Military career
- Allegiance: Kingdom of Greece; Auton. Rep. of Northern Epirus; (Greece) Provisional Government of National Defence; (Greece) Second Hellenic Republic
- Branch: Hellenic Army
- Service years: 1900–1920; 1922–1926
- Rank: Lieutenant General
- Unit: Hellenic Military Geographical Service
- Commands: 6th Infantry Regiment (Company Commander); 1st Infantry Division (Chief of Infantry); Archipelago Division; IV Army Corps
- Conflicts: Balkan Wars: First Balkan War; Second Balkan War; North Epirote struggle World War I: Macedonian front; Battle of Skra-di-Legen; Greco-Turkish War (1919–1922): Greek landing at Smyrna; Greek Summer Offensive
- Other work: Minister of Military Affairs

Charalambos Tseroulis (Greek: Χαράλαμπος Τσερούλης; 1 June 1879 – 2 May 1929) was a distinguished infantry officer of the Hellenic Army who rose to the rank of Lieutenant General.

== Life ==
Tseroulis was born on 1 June 1879 in Missolonghi. After studies in the Hellenic Military Academy, he was commissioned as an Infantry 2nd Lieutenant on 16 July 1900. Early in his career he served in the Hellenic Military Geographical Service, and fought in the Balkan Wars of 1912–13 as a company commander in the 6th Infantry Regiment of the 3rd Infantry Division. After the Balkan Wars, in early 1914, he fought as a volunteer for the autonomy of Northern Epirus.

In Autumn 1916 he joined the National Defence uprising and was appointed as commander of the 2nd Regiment of the Serres Division, which he led to the front near Gevgelija (Macedonian front). He commanded the regiment in the Battle of Skra-di-Legen in May 1918, and became chief of infantry of the 3rd Infantry Division in August 1918. In May 1919, as chief of infantry of the 1st Infantry Division, he took part in the Greek landing at Smyrna and the subsequent operations for the capture of Aydın. He then led detachments of the Archipelago Division in the capture of Pergamon. He was later promoted to commander of the entire Archipelago Division which he led in the Greek Summer Offensive of 1920, capturing Balikesir and Bursa.

Following the November 1920 elections, he was dismissed from the army as a Venizelist. He was recalled to active service by the September 1922 Revolution, and appointed commander of IV Army Corps in the Army of the Evros. He continued to command various Corps until 21 April 1926, when he was named Minister of Military Affairs by the dictatorial regime of Theodoros Pangalos, a post he held until the overthrow of the regime on 22 August. He retired with the rank of Lieutenant General on 30 August 1926.

Tseroulis died on 2 May 1929.

Political offices
Preceded by Theodoros Pangalos	Minister for Military Affairs of Greece; 21 April – 22 August 1926	Succeeded by Georgios Kondylis
