= Georgios Maris =

Greek politician (1882–1949)

Georgios Maris (1882–1949) was a Greek politician. He was three times minister of the interior of Greece (1924–1925, 1928, 1929–1930, 1933. He was minister of finance (1928–1932), the economy (1924), communication (1924) and agriculture (1924–1925).

Preceded by Georgios Kondylis	Minister of the Interior of Greece	Succeeded by Andreas Panagiotopoulos
Preceded by Alexandros Zaimis	Minister of the Interior of Greece; 1928	Succeeded by Konstantinos Gotsis
Preceded by Ioannis Metaxas	Minister of the Interior of Greece; 1933	Succeeded by Efthymios Tsimikalis
