= Philippe Henri Joseph d'Anselme =

French general (1864–1936)

Philippe Henri Joseph d'Anselme (Voreppe, 30 August 1864 – 26 March 1936) was a French general during World War I and the Southern Russia Intervention. He was the son of Joseph Charles Denis d’Anselme and Louise d’Agoult.

== Career ==
In September 1912 he became Chief of Staff of the French occupation Army in Eastern Morocco. During World War I he was first commander of the 1er Régiment de Tirailleurs Algériens, then of the 1st Moroccan Infantry Brigade and in January 1916 of the 127th Infantry Division.

On 9 July 1918, he became commander of the 1st Division Group of the Allied Army of the Orient on the Macedonian front, which was composed of the French 16th Colonial Division, the Greek Archipelago Division and the British 27th Infantry Division.

In March 1919, he took over command of the French-Greek Southern Russia Intervention from General Berthelot, at a moment when the Intervention had already failed and the evacuation was being prepared.

On 10 September 1919, he became commander of the 38th Infantry Division. In February 1924, he was appointed commander of the occupation Division in Tunisia and in March 1926, supreme commander of all French troops in Tunisia.

He retired 6 months later, on 30 August 1926.

He was a Commander of the Légion d’Honneur.

== Source ==
- This is a translation of an article in the French Wikipedia, Philippe Henri Joseph d'Anselme.
