= Dimitrios Katheniotis =

Greek Lieutenant General (c. 1882–1947)

- Δημήτριος Καθενιώτης
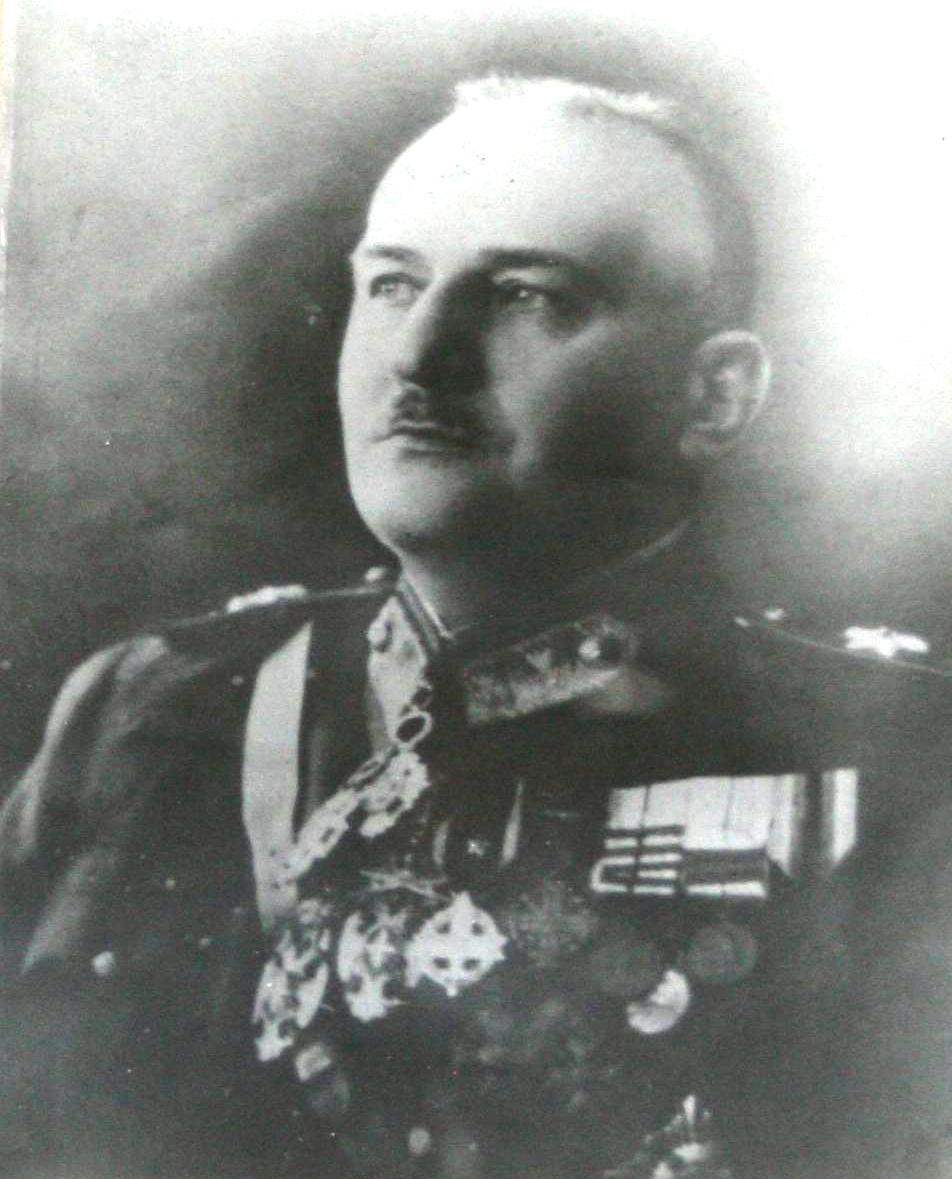
- Dimitrios Katheniotis c. 1932
- Born: c. 1882; Chalkis, Kingdom of Greece
- Died: 23 February 1947; Athens, Kingdom of Greece
- Military career
- Allegiance: Kingdom of Greece; Second Hellenic Republic
- Branch: Hellenic Army
- Service years: 1901–20; 1922–35
- Rank: Lieutenant General
- Commands: Archipelago Division; 11th Infantry Division; Chief of the Hellenic Army General Staff
- Wars: Balkan Wars: First Balkan War; Second Balkan War; World War I: Macedonian front; Vardar Offensive; Greco-Turkish War (1919–22)
- Awards: War Cross (1916-17 variant); Medal of Military Merit; Order of the White Eagle; Croix de Guerre

Dimitrios Katheniotis (Greek: Δημήτριος Καθενιώτης; 1882 – 23 February 1947) was a Hellenic Army officer who rose to the rank of Lieutenant General and served as chief of the Hellenic Army General Staff in 1933–35.

== Biography ==
Born in Chalkis in 1882, Dimitrios Katheniotis entered the Hellenic Army Academy in 1901 and graduated on 8 July 1904, as an artillery second lieutenant. Promoted to lieutenant in 1910, he took part in the Balkan Wars of 1912–13 as a staff officer in the 7th Infantry Division. In 1913, he was promoted to captain, and in 1915 to major.

In September 1916, he joined the Venizelist Movement of National Defence in Thessaloniki, which in opposition to the royal government in Athens entered World War I on the side of the Entente. In 1916–17, he served as chief of staff to the newly raised Archipelago Division, being promoted to lieutenant colonel in 1917. In 1918, he was appointed as the liaison between the Greek Army's staff service and the Allied commander-in-chief in the Macedonian front, French general Adolphe Guillaumat. During the September 1918 Vardar Offensive, he was attached to the Greek Archipelago Division as liaison officer.

Following the Armistice of Mudros, Katheniotis, from 1919 a full colonel, was sent by the Greek Prime Minister Eleftherios Venizelos to the Ottoman capital, Constantinople, where he became involved in the contacts of the Greek government with the Pontic Greeks who inhabited parts of north-eastern Anatolia, and their aspirations for independence from the rump Ottoman state. His report on the Pontic issue, however, pointed out that any thought of a union with Greece, or the establishment of an independent "Republic of Pontus", were unfeasible, and recommended the co-operation of the Pontians with newly independent Armenia in a confederative state.

Like many Venizelist officers, he was dismissed from the Army in November 1920 following the Venizelist electoral defeat. Following the disastrous defeat of the Greek army in Anatolia by the Turkish nationalist forces in August 1922 and the subsequent outbreak of a military revolt, he was recalled to active service by the new revolutionary government, and appointed as CO of the Adrianople Division and then of the 11th Infantry Division. In 1924, he was promoted to major general, and served in succession as Deputy Chief of the Hellenic Army General Staff, commandant of the Supreme War Academy, and military attaché in Paris. On 15 July 1933, he was promoted to lieutenant general and named chief of the Army General Staff, a position he held until his retirement in 1935, following the failed Venizelist coup attempt in March. He was considered as one of the best-educated and knowledgeable officers of his time.

Katheniotis was married and had a daughter. He died on 23 February 1947.

Military offices
Preceded by Lt General Theodoros Manetas	Chief of the Hellenic Army General Staff; 15 July 1933 – March 1935	Succeeded by Lt General Aristeidis Chasapidis
