= Dimitrios Ioannou =

Hellenic army officer (1861–1926)

- Δημήτριος Ioannou
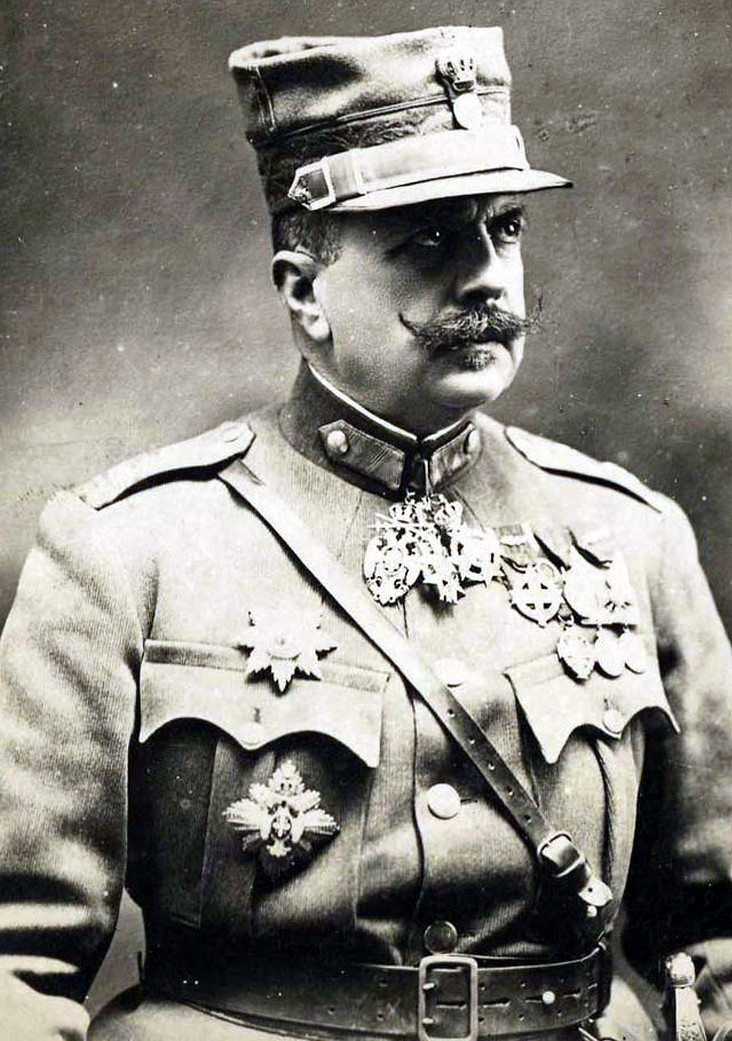
- Ioannou in 1920
- Born: 23 October 1861; Livadeia, Kingdom of Greece
- Died: 1926; Athens, Second Hellenic Republic
- Education: Hellenic Military Academy
- Military career
- Allegiance: Kingdom of Greece
- Branch: Hellenic Army
- Service years: 1881–1920
- Rank: Lieutenant General
- Nickname: Balafaras
- Commands: 9th Infantry Division; Archipelago Division; I Army Corps; Army of Epirus; Smyrna Army Corps
- Conflicts: Greco-Turkish War of 1897; Cretan Revolt; Balkan Wars; First Balkan War; Battle of Bizani; Second Balkan War; World War I; Macedonian front; Battle of Skra-di-Legen; Vardar Offensive; Greco-Turkish War (1919–1922); Greek Summer Offensive
- Awards: Grand Commander of the Order of the Redeemer; War Cross (1917 variant); Medal of Military Merit; Order of the White Eagle

Dimitrios Ioannou (Greek: Δημήτριος Ioannou October 23, 1861 – 1926) was a senior officer of the Hellenic Army who fought in the Macedonian front during World War I and in the opening stages of the Greco-Turkish War of 1919–1922.

== Biography ==
Born on 23 October 1861 at Levadeia, Ioannou entered the Hellenic Military Academy and was commissioned as a 2nd Lieutenant in the Engineers on 25 July 1884. In 1897, as a captain, he participated in the Greek expeditionary force to Crete under Colonel Timoleon Vassos. By the time the First Balkan War broke out October 1912 he was a Lt. Colonel, and served as chief of staff of the Army of Epirus, under Lt. General Konstantinos Sapountzakis. Later, during the Battle of Bizani, he commanded a detachment of four Evzone battalions, and was distinguished for his drive and determination.

He was named as the commanding officer of the newly raised 9th Infantry Division in 1913, and commanded it until 1916, when he joined the Venizelist Movement of National Defence in Thessaloniki, which, in opposition to the royal government in Athens, entered World War I on the side of the Entente Powers. Ioannou was tasked with the formation of the Archipelago Division, drawn from the inhabitants of the Aegean islands. By May 1917, his division was ready and deployed in the Monastir sector of the Macedonian front. He led his division to victory at the Battle of Skra-di-Legen in May 1918, and participated with it in the general Allied offensive of September 1918, which broke the German-Bulgarian front. The armistice with Bulgaria found him with his division at Pehčevo.

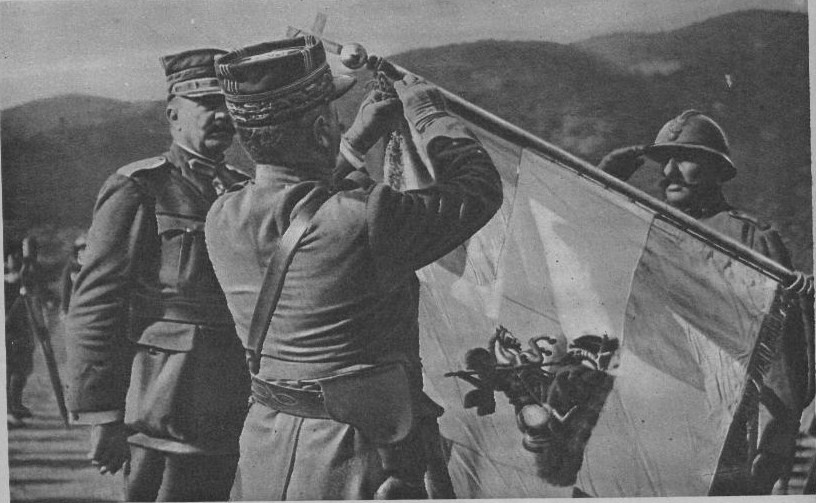
Allied commander-in-chief Louis Franchet d'Espérey decorates the battle flag of the 5th Archipelago Regiment in 1918, with commander Dimitrios Ioannou to his left.

Promoted to Lieutenant General already a few months earlier, Ioannou now assumed command of I Army Corps and then of the Army of Epirus. Following the Greek landing at Smyrna in May 1919 and the establishment of a zone of occupation around the city, he was chosen to command the newly constituted Smyrna Army Corps, which he led in the spring operations and the summer offensive of 1920. Following the unexpected electoral victory of the anti-Venizelist United Opposition in November 1920, he was dismissed from his post. He died in 1926 in Athens.

== Legacy ==
Ioannou enjoyed a reputation as an expert in fortifications, but distinguished himself for his—often reckless—bravery and aggressiveness as a leader. The Greek writer Stratis Myrivilis, in his anti-war novel Life in the Tomb, which describes life on the Macedonian Front based on the author's own experiences as a soldier in the Archipelago Division, gives a portrait of Ioannou, under his popular nickname Balafaras: a slightly buffoonish but larger-than-life man, who likes to demonstrate his personal bravery by refusing to take cover or wear a helmet while visiting the trenches in full uniform, and whose more foolhardy impulses have to be restrained by his aides and the French high command.
