= Southern Russia intervention =

Allied intervention in the Russian Civil War

Southern Russia Intervention
- Part of the Southern Front of the Russian Civil War
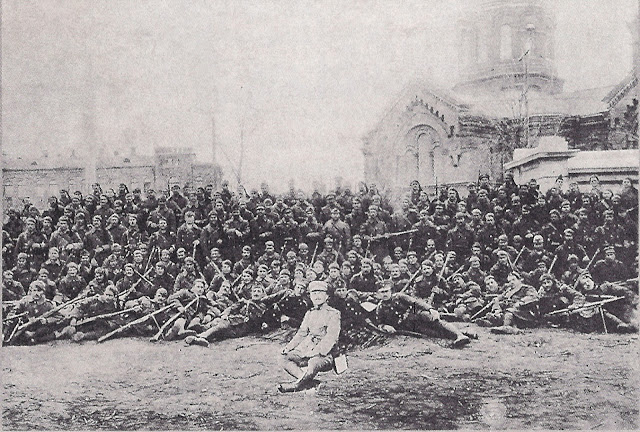
- Greek soldiers of the 5/42 Evzone Regiment in Odessa, 1919
Date	18 December 1918 – 30 April 1919
Location	Sevastopol, Odessa, Kherson and Nikolaev
Result	Bolshevik victory
Territorial changes	Allied evacuation

Belligerents
Allies: (French Third Republic) France; (Kingdom of Greece) Greece; (Second Polish Republic) Poland; (Kingdom of Romania) Romania; Crimea; South Russia	Bolsheviks: Soviet Russia; Soviet Ukraine	Ukrainian People's Republic

Commanders and leaders
(French Third Republic) Henri Bertholot; Philippe d'Anselme; Ioan Pătrașcu; Konstantinos Nider; Anton Denikin	Vladimir Antonov-Ovseyenko; Anatoly Skachko; Nykyfor Hryhoriv (From February 18)	(Ukrainian People's Republic) Symon Petliura (Ukrainian People's Republic) Nykyfor Hryhoriv

Strength
In Ukraine: (Kingdom of Greece) 23,000; (French Third Republic) 15,000; 4,000; In Crimea: (French Third Republic) 3,000; (Kingdom of Greece) 2,000; 5,000	30,000–40,000	

The Southern Russia intervention was an Allied military intervention in present-day Ukraine between December 1918 and April 1919 on the Black Sea shores of the former Russian Empire, as part of the Allied intervention in Russia after the October Revolution. The intervention was an involvement in the Russian Civil War on the side of the White movement, but lacking in forces and sympathy among the local population, it was a failure that ended with the evacuation of the territory.

French-led forces landed in Ukraine in December 1917. Short on personnel, officers and supplies, demoralized and receptive to Soviet propaganda, they soon had to leave the initial offensive plan and adopt a defensive strategy against the Bolshevik forces. Thanks to the arrival of reinforcements throughout December 1918 and January 1919, the Allies managed to take control of various cities in Ukraine and Crimea: Kherson, Nikolaev, Sevastopol and Tiraspol, some ceded by agreement by the Central Council of Ukraine.

With troops short and demoralized, unwilling to risk their lives in Russia for a cause they did not understand, the French commanders saw little future for the campaign. Bolshevik forces seemed numerous, well commanded and supported by the population that had received those of the Entente with hostility. The anti-Bolsheviks, for their own part, were unable to forge an alliance, separated by deep differences that caused the French frustration. The defeats at Kherson and Nikolaev in March convinced the French commanders of desirability of reaching an agreement with the Bolshevik authorities and ending the expedition. This was approved at the end of March and carried out at the beginning of the following month. Otaman Nykyfor Hryhoriv formally submitted to the Bolshevik command of Vladimir Antonov-Ovseyenko, had succeeded in expelling the Allied forces from the occupied coastal cities in late 1918 and early 1919.

== Background ==
=== First actions in Russia ===
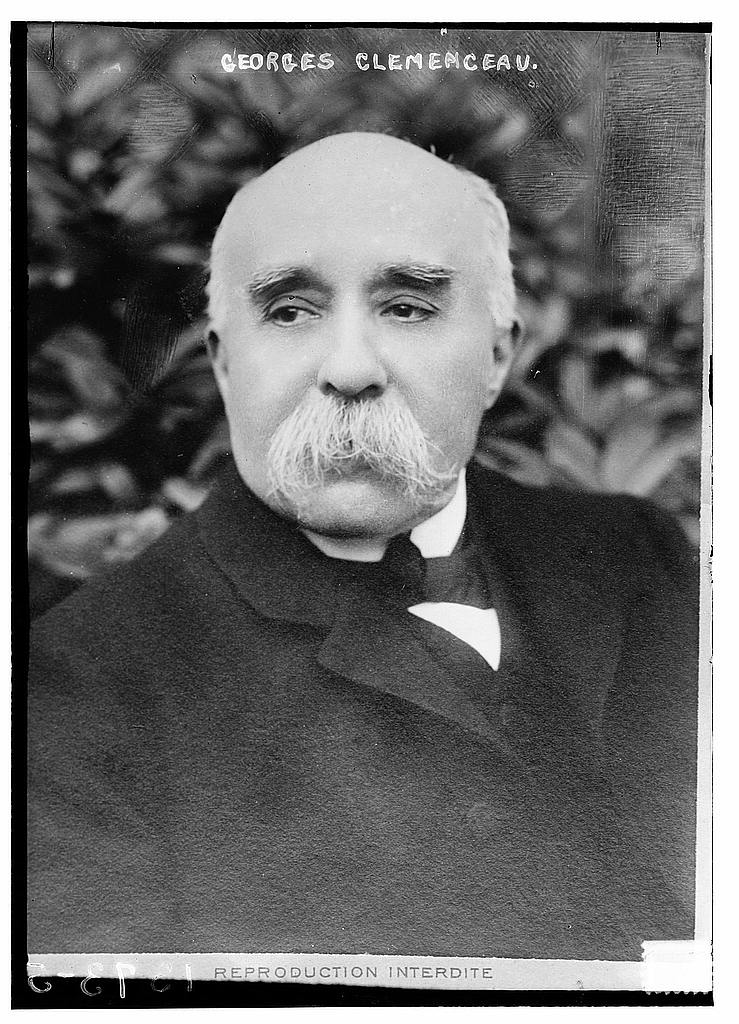
Georges Clemenceau, the prime minister of France who decided to intervene militarily in the Russian Civil War on behalf of the anti-Bolshevik forces, partly for economic reasons.

On 23 December 1917, the British and French governments had divided the region into zones of operations: Crimea, Donbas, and Ukraine remained on the French side. In addition, the Prime minister of France, Georges Clemenceau, approved a loan of one hundred million francs to finance anti-Bolshevik activities in Russia. Clemenceau's idea was to use control of the grain-rich Ukraine and the industry of Donetsk to try to recover the losses of French investors in Russia, after the new Bolshevik government had refused payment of the Russian debt. During the first year of Bolshevik rule, French aid to its enemies was limited to funding and the dispatch of some military advisers. This was not, however, Clemenceau's original plan, which provided for the sending of various allied units to Russia once the fighting in the Balkans and the Middle East had ended. The allied expeditionary force was to serve as the unifying nucleus of the Russian anti-Bolshevik forces. These troops were to facilitate the establishment of a new Russian Government, favourable to the political and economic interests of the Entente. Shortly before the October Revolution, the French high command in Paris had outlined plans to intervene in Russia in order to maintain the Eastern Front and prevent areas of strategic economic interest from falling into German hands.

Following the signing of the Treaty of Brest-Litovsk peace treaty between Soviet Russia and the Central Powers in March 1918, the French Foreign Ministry, supported by its former ambassador to Russia, Joseph Noulens, advocated the total rupture of relations with the Bolshevik government, while the military commanders defended the agreement with Lenin to limit the German advance. Noulens and the ministry proposed, on the contrary, to support the anti-Bolshevik groups bent on overthrowing the Bolshevik government. In the late summer of 1918, Paris adopted the position hostile to Moscow that its diplomats recommended. Clemenceau decided to send a military expedition to Russia, despite the scepticism of the military commanders about its chances of success.

=== French plans ===
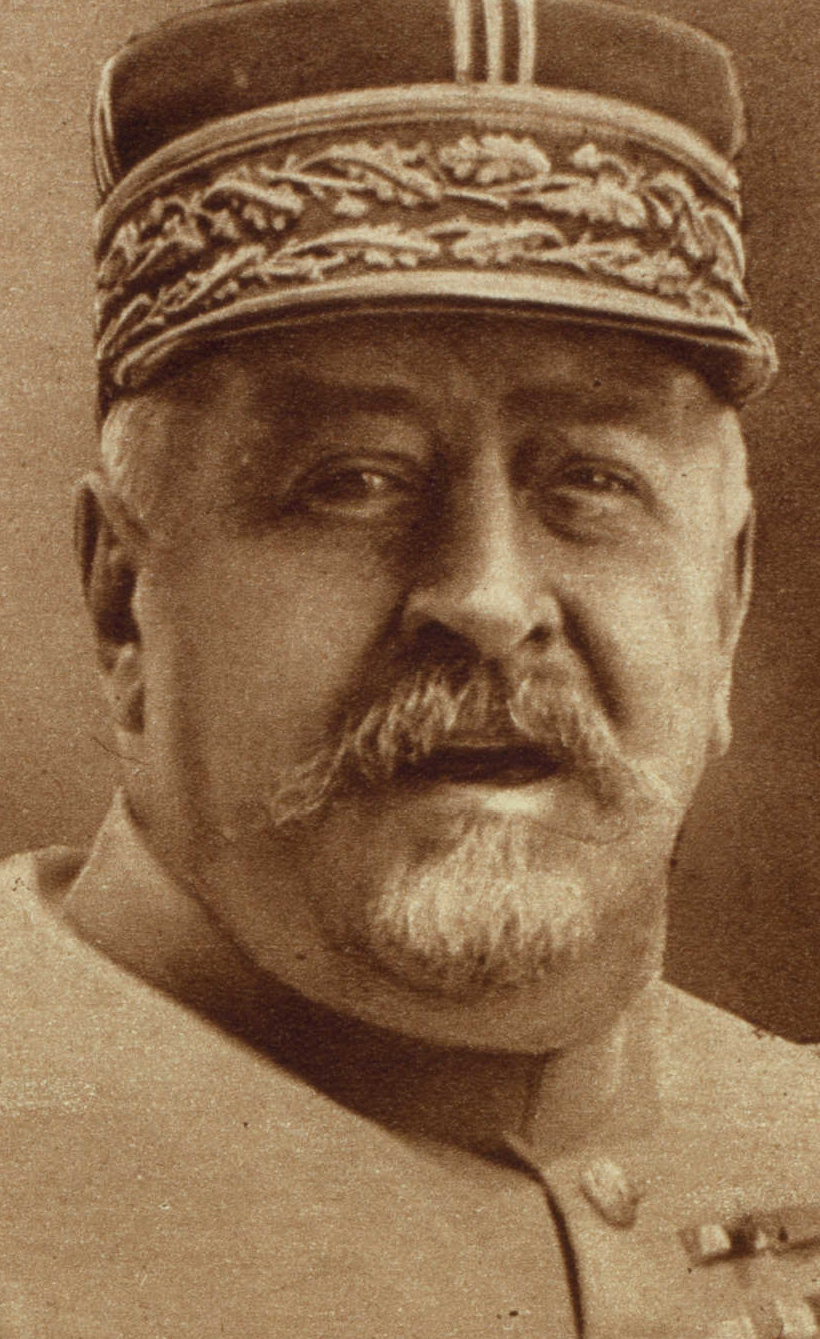
French General Henri Berthelot, a veteran of the Romanian Front, was left in command of the military intervention in Ukraine and Crimea.

The first indication of the French government's intentions to intervene in the south of the former Russian Empire was the appointment on 7 October 1918 of General Henri Berthelot—a veteran of the Romanian Front— at the head of a military mission that covered Romania and Ukraine. His mission was not only to ensure the withdrawal of the Central Powers from the two territories, but also to "carry out the economic encirclement of Bolshevism and bring about its downfall." Berthelot had to use the allied units deployed in the Balkans in a military intervention that combined political and economic objectives, in the style of colonial expeditions. To allay the suspicions of Anton Denikin, who considered Berthelot too pro-Romanian, (Note: Berthelot had headed the French military mission in Romania in 1916-1917 and the Russians and Romanians disputed the control of Bessarabia.) and to assure him of the seriousness of the French plans, the French general told Denikin's representative, General Dmitry Shcherbachev, that the Allies were willing to employ twelve divisions in southern Russia and collaborate with their forces in the fight against the Bolsheviks. These promises were based on informal information that Berthelot had received in France before leaving on his mission and were exaggerated, although they fed the illusions of the Volunteer Army. (Note: According to a member of the British military mission at Denikin's headquarters, in December: Denikin's General Staff had prepared a beautiful plan to reconquer Russia that required eighteen Allied divisions and ammunition and so on for half a million Russian soldiers that he intended to recruit under the protection of the Allied divisions.)

For his part, General Franchet d'Espèrey, from whose forces Berthelot's forces were to come and who was on bad terms with Clemenceau, severely criticized the intervention plans. According to Franchet d'Espèrey, the forces planned for the operation were insufficient, part of the units that had to march to the east were very weak and some, like the Senegalese, would not be able to stand the harsh climate of the region. He also warned of the discouragement and weariness of the war that had spread among some units. (Note: Some soldiers had spent eighteen to twenty-four months at the front without rest permits.) Soon Berthelot began to share Franchet d'Espèrey's scepticism about the campaign: instead of the planned twelve divisions, he was only able to obtain three, and one of them was weakened by the spread of influenza in its ranks.

After several weeks without receiving further instructions about his mission, Berthelot finally obtained more instructions on 21 November: the operation was to go beyond the occupation of Odessa and for this it would have three French and as many Greek divisions, in addition to a Romanian contingent that would be sent to him later. Berthelot, who considered these forces insufficient to guarantee the success of the mission, suggested the inclusion of fifteen Romanian regiments, framed in mixed Franco-Romanian divisions, which made it necessary to increase the French forces by about seven or nine regiments. Both the support units and the artillery or the financing of these units would have to be borne by France. In December, he warned again of the likelihood of failure if the forces assigned to the campaign proved too meager, a view shared by Franchet d'Espèrey, who preferred to arm local anti-Bolshevik forces and limit French involvement to advisers. Finally the French Government, wishing to demobilize units and with other regions to attend to, did not approve of Berthelot's plan, and only sent part of a French division and some Greek units. The inclusion of these was due to Clemenceau's desire to use Allied rather than French troops wherever possible and to the availability of relatively fresh Greek forces, provided in exchange for promises of favourable consideration of Greek territorial claims at the Paris Peace Conference.

Indeed, the Greek authorities promised the participation of forty-two thousand men, framed in three divisions of the I Army Corps, although only two of them—the 2nd and the 13th—were finally deployed in Ukrainian territory. (Note: The third ended up being used in the capture of İzmir and not in the Russian campaign.) The ground troops were joined by an allied squadron made up of French, British and Greek ships.

=== Situation of the region on the eve of the intervention ===
In November 1918, the German 7th Division reached Odessa—a city with a very mixed population, barely a fifth Ukrainian and a large number of Russians and Jews— to replace the retreating Austro-Hungarian forces. The unit was soon cut off from the rest of the country by the forces of the Ukrainian Directorate, who surrounded it. British and French warships docked at the port (17 December), but no troops landed. The presence of these ships, however, encouraged Polish and Russian officers to create volunteer units. With the arrival of Directorate forces in the outskirts of the city on 24 December, these units took refuge in the port, under allied protection. The city was left in the hands of units led by Symon Petliura, who maintained an uneasy truce with Denikin.

== Intervention ==
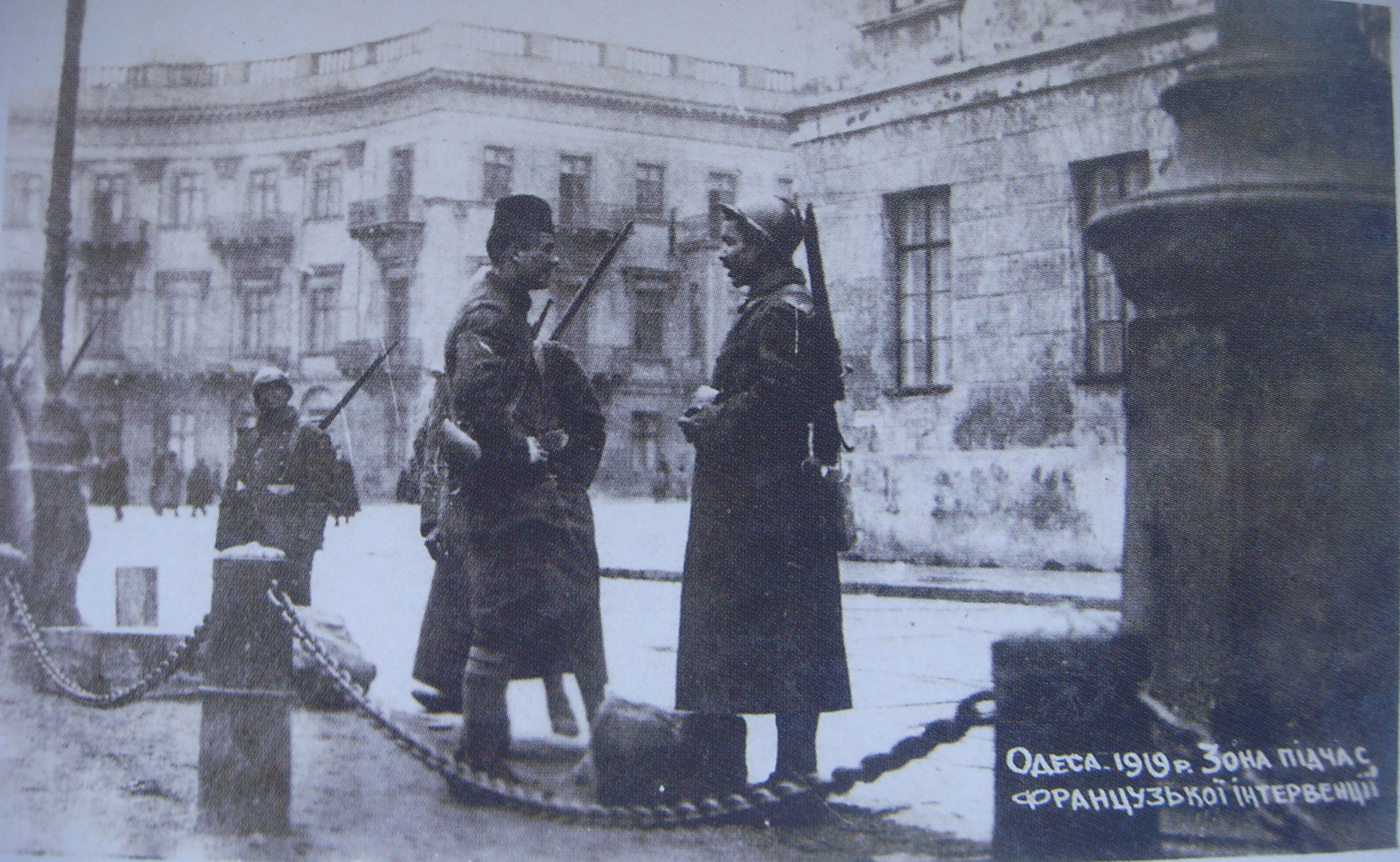
French soldiers deployed in Odessa.

A French expeditionary force, Army of the Danube (AD), landed in the city a week after the arrival of the Directorate units and, with the help of Polish and Russian officers and after heavy fighting, expelled them from the city. (Note: Munholland, on the other hand, states that there were only short skirmishes and that the Withdrawal of the Directorate units was agreed between them and the French command.) The Germans remained neutral in the conflict, while they tried with relative success to abandon the city. The German 15th Division at Nikolaev was in a similar situation to the 7th, captured at Odessa.

The initial objective of the French Government was to achieve the military defeat of the Bolsheviks and at the same time gain a zone of influence in the area that could bring economic benefits. Once Odessa was under control, General Borius, in command of the French forces that had occupied it, declared it under French protection. He appointed General Grishin-Almazov, a local representative of Denikin, as military governor of the city, which intensified the impression that the French were backing him.

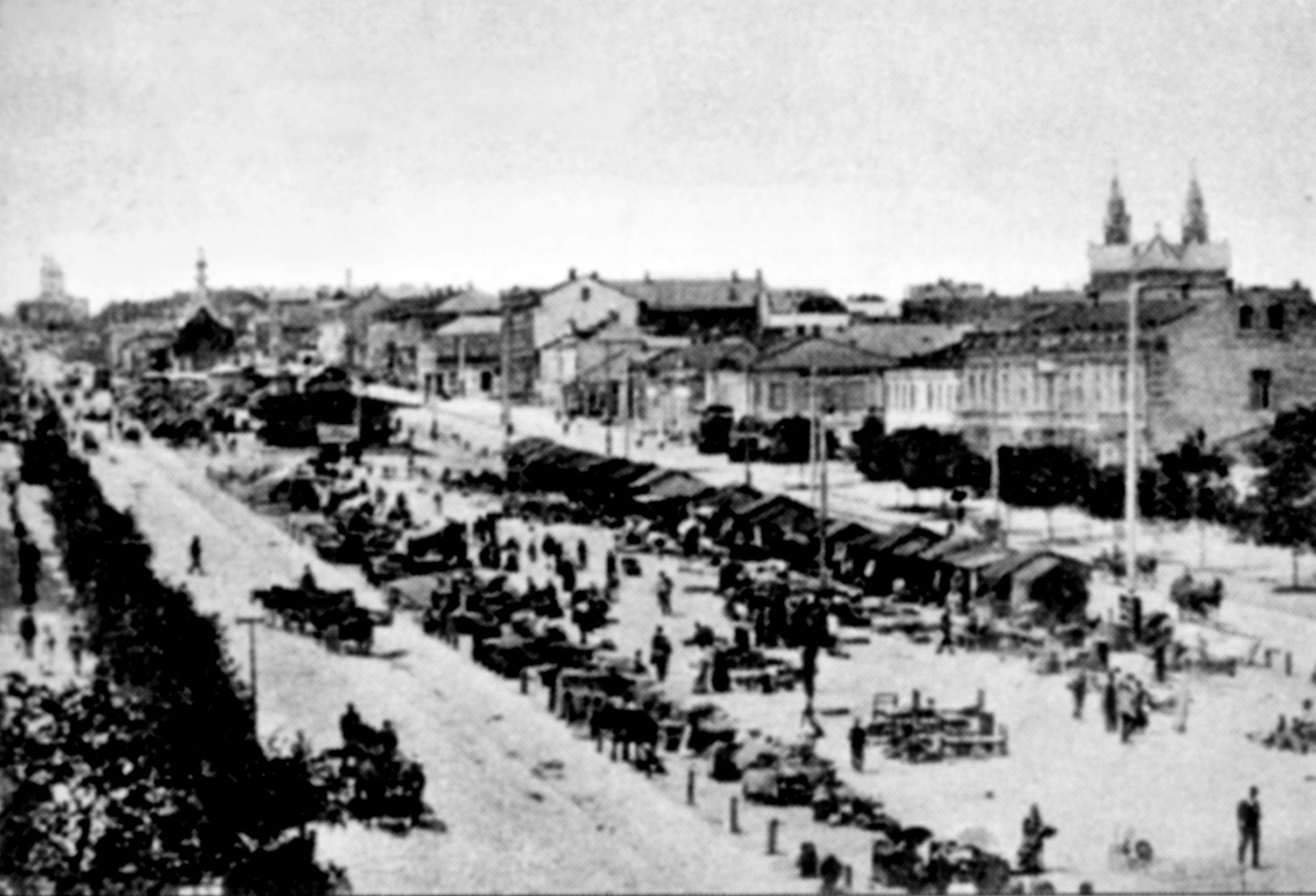
Nikolaev, one of several towns that the Directorate of Ukraine handed over to Allied military control in early 1919.

While Polish, Russian, and Romanian contingents remained in Odessa, Greek units landed in Kherson. (Note: The Poles contributed three thousand men and the Romanians, two thousand five hundred, viewed with suspicion by the Ukrainian population due to the territorial disputes between the different groups, despite the military value of these forces.) Other Allied units fanned out across Sevastopol on 25 December. Joint command was left to French General Philippe d 'Anselme as of January. He ordered the German 15th Division to maintain order in Nikolaev. This city, together with Tiraspol and Kherson, was controlled by the Allies. D'Anselme negotiated the peaceful surrender of Kherson and Nikolaev with Petliura's delegates. These conversations disgusted Denikin, even though D'Anselme reminded him that his orders stated that he must cooperate with all anti-Bolshevik forces and that the deals with the Directorate they were not political, but only military. Negotiations with the Directorate continued unsuccessfully until February, when the Bolsheviks expelled them from Kiev. The latter had been willing to accept practically all of the French demands except for the resignation of Petliura, but this was not enough for an agreement to be reached between the Entente and the former. In addition, the weaker that the Directorate became, the less the French were interested in forming an agreement with it. The talks, however, had made it possible to expand the perimeter under French control around Odessa and facilitate the control of a strip of territory that reached the Dnieper, without the need to fight.

However, the coastal cities were cut off from the rest of Ukraine by the forces of the Directorate and the various otamans. The main one, Nykyfor Hryhoriv, who was opposed to the rapprochement with France and abandoned his loyalty to the Directorate to go over to the Bolsheviks, controlled the interior. The French and their allies were unable to expel him from his positions during the operations they carried out during the month of February.

== Status ==
The French plan depended on the collaboration of all the anti-Bolshevik forces in the area, which was not achieved. The general hostility of the population, the resistance of the Bolsheviks, the mutinies of their own troops, the lack of supplies and the disunity of the anti-Bolshevik forces first convinced the French military commanders and then their Government of the inconvenience of continuing the military intervention in the region. From direct intervention, the French moved on to a strategy of containment and aid to the White movement.

The disunity of the anti-Bolshevik formations, which had already been made clear at the Iaşi Conference, became evident again in Ukraine and caused great frustration to the French military commanders. The quarrels between the different groups, which included anyone from monarchists to socialists, prevented the drafting of a common political program.

In addition, relations between the Volunteer Army and the French commanders were tense. They considered it excessively reactionary, lacking popular sympathy and forces in the area to become the core of an anti-Bolshevik army. (Note: According to D'Anselme: Between the volunteers and the people there is a true and savage hatred.) Various French officers' impressions of Denikin's supporters were unfavourable: they continued to maintain their pre-war habits of arrogance and irresponsibility, they were a small force and overstaffed. (Note: According to D'Anselme's chief of staff, nine-tenths of Denikin's forces were officers, and these lacked a popular base. D'Anselme himself noted the poor desire to fight for these forces and the existence of nine White admirals to control the port of Odessa. Franchet d'Espèrey reported that: Denikin's army is more of a nuisance than a help... It has all the faults of the old Russian Army and none of its virtues.) The perception of the Russian officers of the French expeditionary force was also negative: they found French commanders arrogant and criticized their contacts with their political rivals in the region.

Likewise, the military intervention did not receive the sympathy of the population. According to D'Anselme, most of the population of the area was pro-Bolshevik and hostile to his forces. The rejection of the population further sank the spirit of the Allied troops. Algerian units refused to embark at Constanța when they were told they were leaving for Odessa; the commanders feared a mutiny by the demoralized troops. The Bolsheviks also launched an intense propaganda campaign to undermine the already dwindling desire of the French soldiers to fight in Russia. The pessimism and lack of enthusiasm for the campaign was not limited to the troops, but also affected the officers. (Note: Colonel Freydenberg, D'Anselme's Chief of Staff, stated that: No French soldier who has saved his life on the Marne or in Verdun would want to lose it in the fields of Russia.) Added to this dispiriting situation was the lack of reinforcements; six weeks after landing in Odessa, Berthelot complained that he had barely three thousand men to dominate the whole of Ukraine. Berthelot requested twenty new divisions, nine of them "trusted" French . The rejection of the intervention by the French left in the Parliament, and the refusal of the Americans and British to deploy large forces as recommended by Marshal Foch, complicated the sending of the reinforcements requested by Berthelot. Clemenceau had to promise in Parliament to limit the intervention to the occupation of a territory where the anti-Bolshevik forces could regroup, without the Allied forces entering into combat with the Soviet forces.

== Defeat ==
=== Ukraine ===
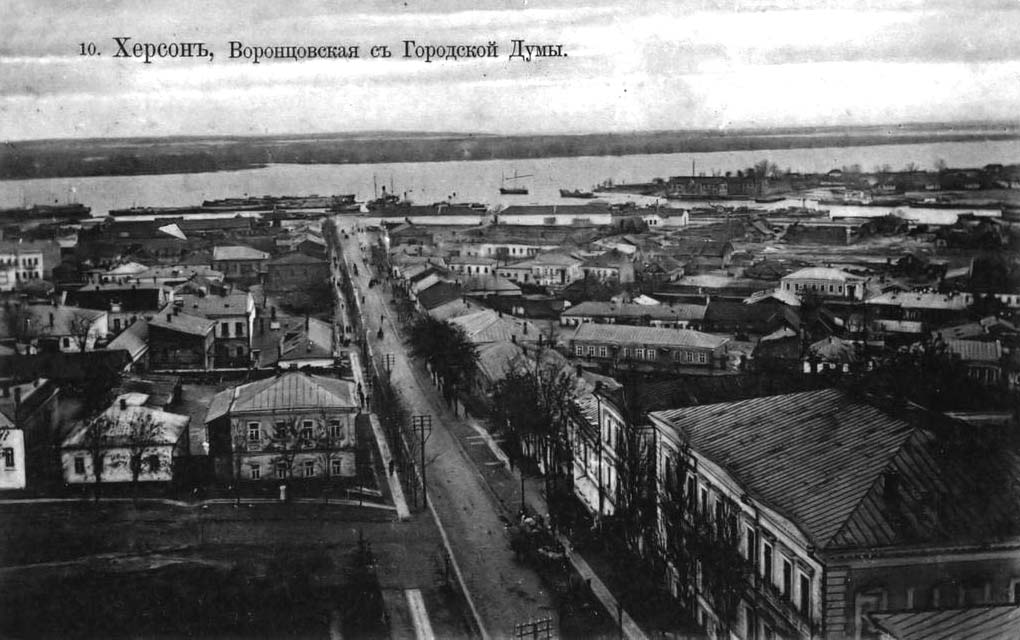
Kherson, one of the cities occupied by the Allies between late 1918 and early 1919, which fell to Nykyfor Hryhoriv's forces in early March.

At the end of February, while Berthelot's envoy requested reinforcements in Paris, Nykyfor Hryhoriv began to advance towards the coast, defended with insufficient forces. By early March, he was at the gates of the main cities. In Kherson, barely one hundred and fifty French, seven hundred Greeks and some Russian officers of dubious military value defended the city . Hryhoriv's forces surrounding the city numbered between ten and twelve thousand men. For its part, Nikolaev had a German garrison of twelve thousand men, but of dubious loyalty to the Allies; German soldiers had no intention of engaging the Bolsheviks in conjunction with their former enemies.

French setbacks encouraged Hryhoriv's forces to storm Nikolaev and Kherson — which had refused to surrender on the night of the 1 March — between 3 and 5 March. But a German armored train, French naval artillery, and Greek units repelled the onslaught. On 6 March, the arrival of two Greek companies allowed an allied counterattack at Kherson and the repulsion of a new assault. The next day, however, a new attack by Hryhoriv's forces managed to break through the city's defenses, aided by an uprising of the population. Two French companies sent to the city to hold the defense on 8 March refused to fight. On 9 March, however, Hryhoriv again attacked Kherson, and this time the Greek defenders decided to evacuate the town. The attackers seized armored train and control of railway station and port, while the defenders took refuge in the citadel. Thanks to the bombardment of French ships and the assault of a Greek company, the Allies managed to retake the port and break the encirclement of the citadel. That same night the evacuation began and the next day the allied ships left the city, which remained in the hands of the besiegers.

With Kherson captured, Hryhoriv concentrated his units on Nikolaev, which he had failed to take on 7 March. The defending forces, five hundred Greeks and two weak French companies, were even smaller than those that had been defeated at Kherson. The defenders could not count on the collaboration of the German garrison nor the local population. Unable to defend the perimeter of the city and fearful of suffering a popular uprising, the French commanders agreed with a local communist delegate for a peaceful evacuation, which took place between 14 and 16 March without incident. Hryhoriv's troops entered the latter at the same time as the Germans —the last to leave the city— embarked to abandon it. A large quantity of German and allied weapons fell into the hands of Hryhoriv.

The Allies then concentrated on the defense of Odessa, the destination of numerous refugees and Hryhoriv's growing forces. One after another, the main French officials advised the Government to evacuate the city. On 16 March, Berthelot requested relief. Although Clemenceau ordered the city to be defended and D'Anselme began to reinforce his perimeter on 13 March, on 16 March the besiegers tightened the close by taking Berezivka, sixty kilometers to the northeast. In various battles, the few Allied forces and those of the Volunteer Army were defeated by the more numerous Bolsheviks. Although the Allies had 25,000 men in Odessa and another 4,000 from the Volunteer Army — the former very discouraged and the latter considered to have no real military value — Hryhoriv's forces were estimated at 30-40,000 men and it was believed that the Bolsheviks could count on the uprising of some fifty thousand city workers. Lacking in food due to not controlling rural areas, the growing population of the city — nearly a million people — was in a dire situation, with provisions for only ten days and dependent on Allied supply by sea. Last minute French attempts to install a Ukrainian-Russian government under clear control of the allied military commanders failed and only served to increase the hostility of the population towards the occupying forces.

Franchet d'Espèrey, on an inspection visit on 20 March, concluded, like D'Anselme, that withdrawal was inevitable. While assuring the Volunteers that his intention was to stay in the city, on 23 March he asked Paris to withdraw. Separately, the French and Greek commands prepared for the evacuation, while the French command officially followed stating their intention to defend it. The French did not communicate their withdrawal plans with their Greek allies — nearly half of the city's forces, while the French only represented a third — nor with Denikin's supporters. On 29 March, Clemenceau announced to Franchet d'Espèrey that the Allies had approved the retreat.

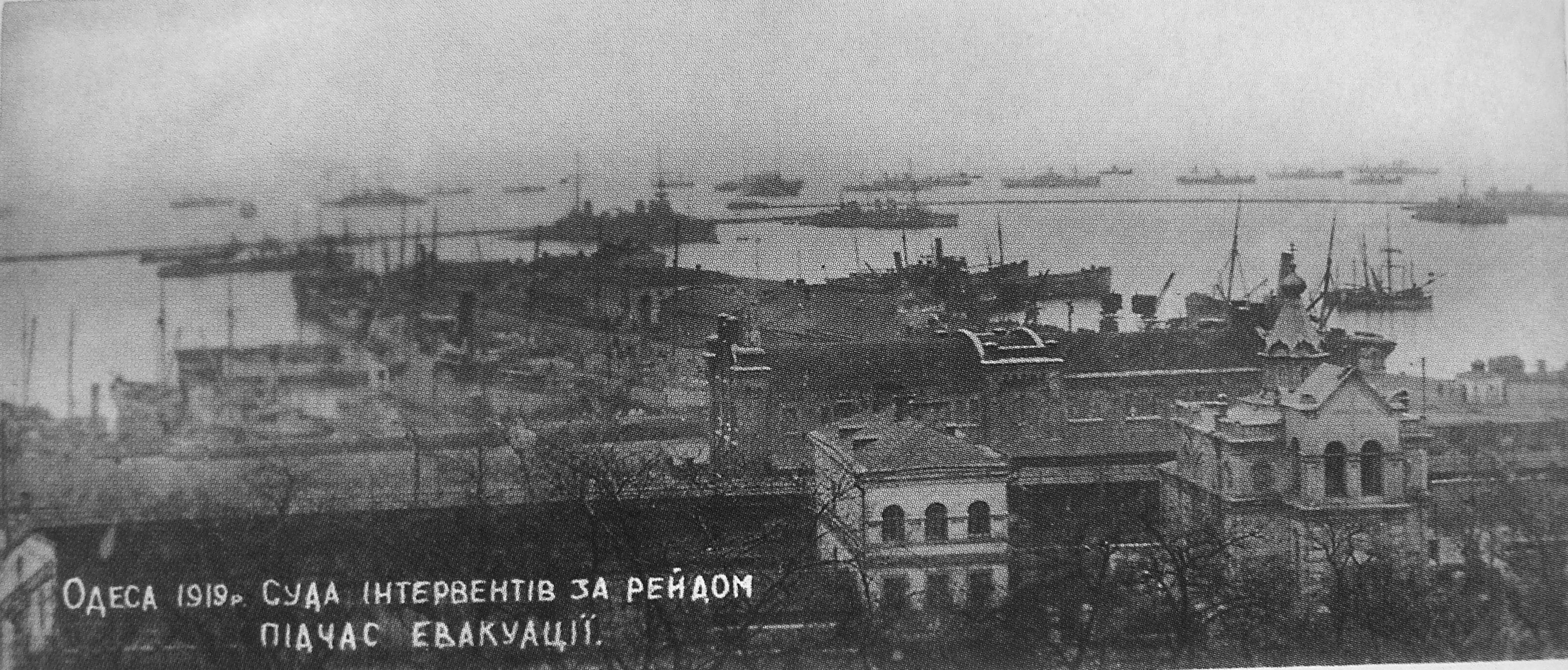
French evacuation of Odessa in April 1919.

On 1 April, the Government of Paris ordered D'Anselme to withdraw from Odessa, which fell to Hryhoriv's meager forces — some two thousand men — who captured a large quantity of weapons. The evacuation took place between 3 and 7 April. The first rumors about the departure of the Allies, which spread on 2 April, gave rise to panic and the concentration of a large number of citizens on the docks, eager to embark on the French ships. In all, thirty thousand soldiers and fifty thousand civilians left Odessa. The Bolsheviks did not interfere with the evacuation. Part of the allied forces, as well as others hostile to the Bolsheviks, retreated overland to Bessarabia, which was temporarily defended from any Bolshevik assault by units of the Greek 13th Division, covering the Allied rear during the retreat west. Denikin, only informed of the French retreat after it had already occurred, accused the French commanders of cowardice and of having left the city unnecessarily.

=== Crimea ===
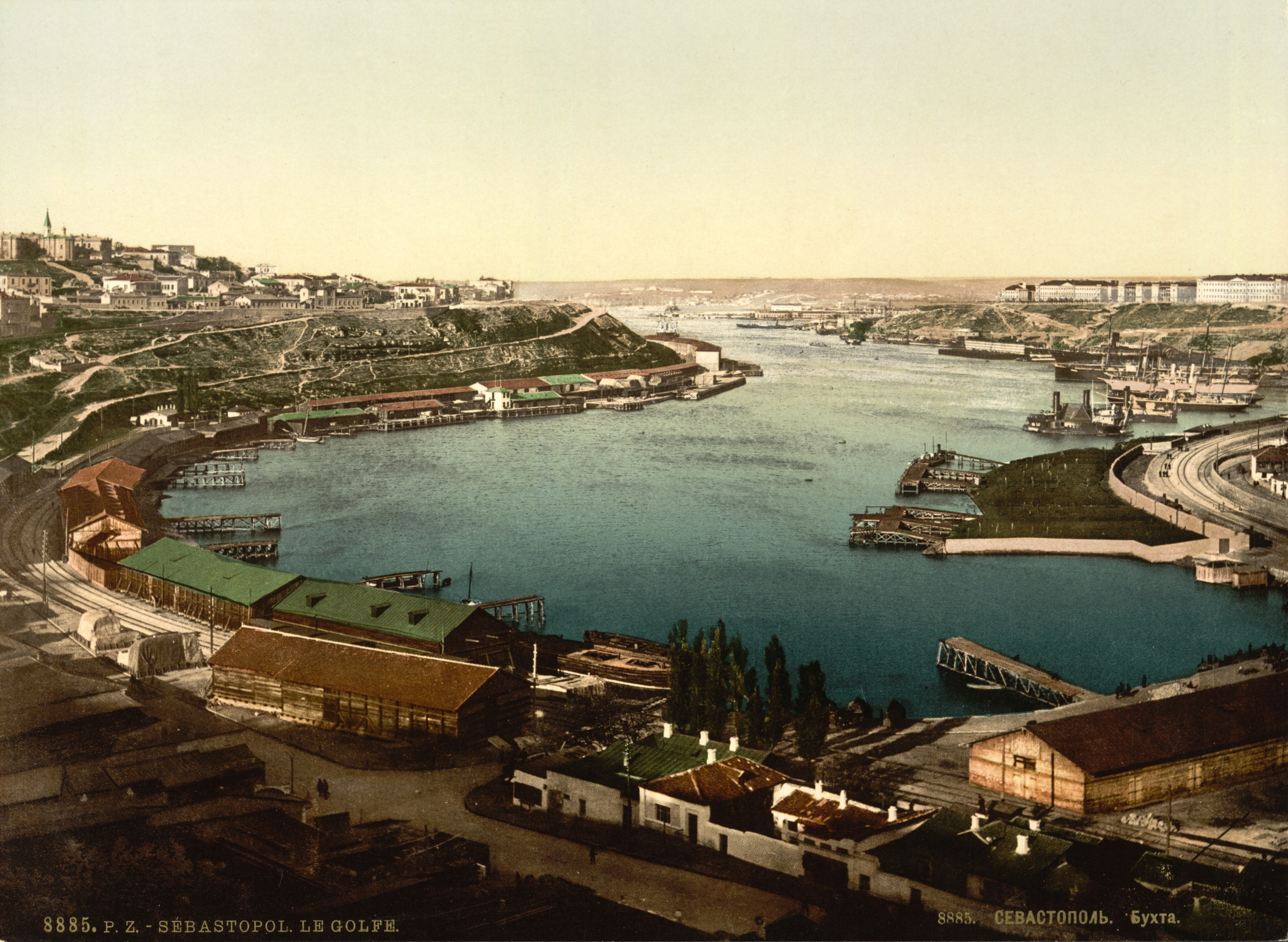
The port of Sevastopol was abandoned by the allied forces after agreeing to a truce that facilitated the evacuation in mid-April, once the local forces were unable to defend Crimea from the Bolshevik forces.

The situation in Crimea, where the Allies had deployed 2,500 men in early April, was similar to that in Ukraine. The Crimean Regional Government had requested help from Anton Denikin's Volunteer Army, which were also not well regarded by the local population. The French commanders again considered the five or six thousand Volunteers of little value as troops.

By the middle of the month and thanks to the arrival of reinforcements originally intended for the defense of Odessa, the Allies had 5,000 men, including 2,000 Greeks with little desire to continue fighting under French command. It was, however, the Greek units of the 13th Division that were in charge of putting down the workers' uprisings in Sevastopol, who were supported by mutinous French soldiers. The French troops, many of them colonial, were also unenthusiastic about the campaign and there were incidents both in Crimea as in Constanța.

On 3 April, Bolshevik forces entered the peninsula after overcoming little resistance from the Volunteers. On 8 April, the Crimean government had to evacuate its capital, Simferopol. On 14 April, the Bolsheviks reached Sevastopol, where the French and Russian commanders maintained tense relations. On 16 April, the French naval artillery repelled an assault on the city and allowed a truce to be signed the next day, that was to last until 25 April. During the truce, the evacuation would be prepared and the government of the city would be handed over to the local soviets. Again, the shortage of troops for defense, the hostility of the bulk of the population and the low morale of the soldiers advised retreat.

With the withdrawal approved by Paris, riots broke out on French ships docked in the port on 19 April, the same day that the administration was to pass into the hands of the Soviets according to the truce agreement. The mutineers demanded their return to France and the end of the military intervention and the next day some participated in a large demonstration in favor of the Soviet Government. The French naval command sent troops ashore who fired into the crowd, causing two deaths and a dozen wounded. The next day, the immediate departure of the ships to France was agreed, which began on 23 April. (Note: The leaders of the mutiny, however, faced court-martial in France.) On the 21st, Franchet d'Espèrey finally ordered the evacuation, which ended on the 28th, after an extension of the truce. The French anti-Bolshevik strategy moved from military intervention to the establishment of a "cordon sanitaire" of countries hostile to communism.

== See also ==
- List of states and regions involved in the Russian Civil War
- Bibliography of the Russian Revolution and Civil War
- Outline of the Russian Revolution and Civil War
- North Russia intervention
- Siberian intervention

== Bibliography ==
- Allen, W. E. D. (1963). The Ukraine: a history. New York: Russell & Russell. OCLC 578666051.
- Fieschi, Pascal (2016). "L'intervention française à Odessa (décembre 1918 - mars 1919) vue à travers l'action du « Consul de France », Emile Henno". Cahiers slaves (in French). 14 (1). Paris: 161–172. doi:10.3406/casla.2016.1142. ISSN 1283-3878. OCLC 7290969875.
- Hunczak, Taras (1977). The Ukraine, 1917–1921: A Study in Revolution. Cambridge, Massachusetts: Harvard University Press. ISBN 9780674920095. OCLC 310782079.
- Kenez, Peter (1977). Civil War in South Russia, 1919-1920: The Defeat of the Whites. Berkeley: University of California Press. ISBN 978-0-520-03346-7. OCLC 797257452.
- Király, Béla K.; Pastor, Peter (1988). War and society in East Central Europe. Vol. 20: Revolutions and interventions in Hungary and its neighbor states, 1918–1919. New York: Columbia University Press. ISBN 9780880331371. OCLC 830834449.
- Mawdsley, Evan (1987). The Russian Civil War. Boston: Unwin Hyman. ISBN 9780049470248. OCLC 974120622.
- Munholland, J. Kim (1981). "The French army and intervention in Southern Russia, 1918–1919". Cahiers du monde russe et soviétique. 22 (1): 43–66. doi:10.3406/cmr.1981.1903. ISSN 0008-0160. OCLC 5546942436.
- Shmelev, Anatol (2003). "The allies in Russia, 1917–20: Intervention as seen by the whites". Revolutionary Russia. 16 (1). Taylor & Francis: 87–107. doi:10.1080/09546540308575766. ISSN 0954-6545. OCLC 760303529. S2CID 145442425.
- Snook, David (1989). "British Naval Operations in the Black Sea 1918–1920, Part I". Warship International. 26 (1): 36–50. ISSN 0043-0374. OCLC 8014468800.
- Wright, Damien (2017). Churchill's Secret War with Lenin: British and Commonwealth Military Intervention in the Russian Civil War, 1918–20. Solihull: Helion. ISBN 9781911512103. OCLC 1023368302.
