= Greek Summer Offensive =

Battle of the Greco-Turkish War

Greek Summer Offensive 1920
- Part of the Greco-Turkish War (1919–22)
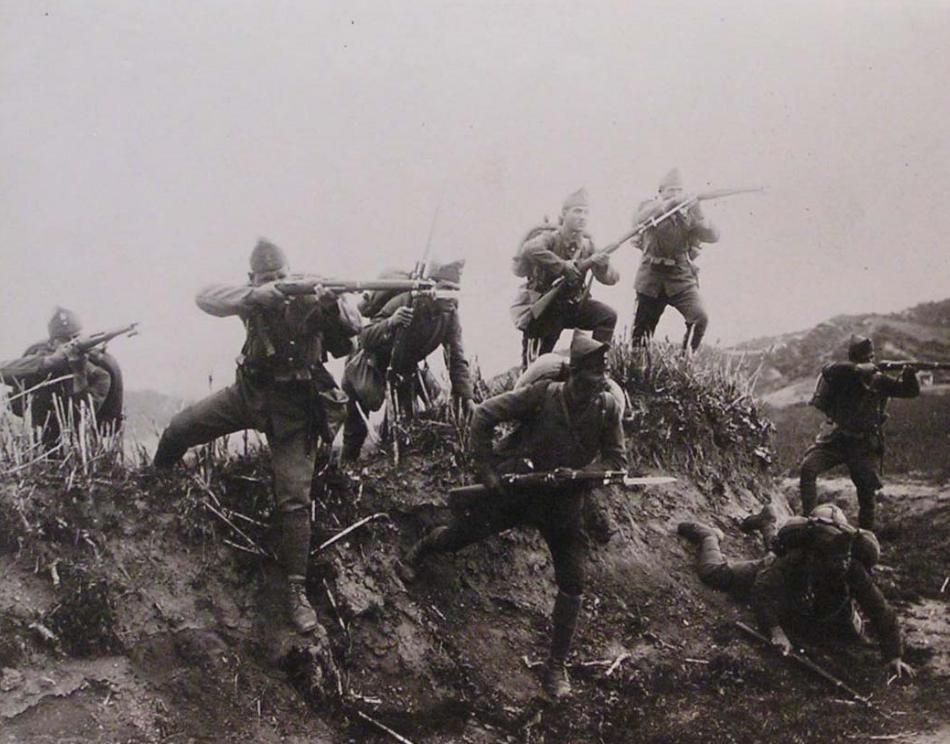
- Greek soldiers advancing.
| Date | June–September 1920 |
| Location | Western Anatolia, southern coast of the Sea of Marmara |
| Result | Greco-British-Ottoman victory: Greek forces penetrate eastwards; Capture of Panormos, Mudanya, Izmit, Bursa, Uşak |

Belligerents
| (Kingdom of Greece) Greece; United Kingdom of Great Britain and Ireland; Ottoman Empire | Ankara Government |

Commanders and leaders
| (Kingdom of Greece) Leonidas Paraskevopoulos; (Kingdom of Greece) Dimitrios Ioannou; (United Kingdom of Great Britain and Ireland) George Milne; Süleyman Şefik Pasha | Ali Fuat Pasha; Çerkes Ethem |

Strength
| (Kingdom of Greece) 65,000 men; (United Kingdom of Great Britain and Ireland) 2,000 men; 2,000 men | 42,250 men |

Casualties and losses
| (Kingdom of Greece) 153 killed, 550 wounded, 8 missing (United Kingdom of Great Britain and Ireland) 1 casualty Unknown | 1,686 killed, unknown wounded, 2,908 captured |

The Greek Summer Offensive of 1920 was an offensive by the Greek army, assisted by British forces, to capture the southern region of the Sea of Marmara and the Aegean Region from the Kuva-yi Milliye (National Forces) of the provisional Turkish national movement government in Ankara. Additionally, the Greek and British forces were supported by the Kuva-yi Inzibatiye (Forces of Order) of the Ottoman government in Constantinople, which sought to crush the Turkish nationalist forces. The offensive was part of the Greco-Turkish War and was one of several engagements where British troops assisted the advancing Greek army. British troops actively took part in invading coastal towns of the Sea of Marmara. With the approval of the Allies, the Greeks started their offensive on 22 June 1920 and crossed the 'Milne Line'. The 'Milne Line' was the demarcation line between Greece and Turkey, laid down in Paris. Resistance by the Turkish nationalists was limited, as they had few and ill-equipped troops in western Anatolia. They were also busy on the eastern and southern fronts. After offering some opposition, they retreated to Eskişehir on Mustafa Kemal Pasha's order.

== Prelude ==
In May 1920, the Kuva-yi Inzibatiye, backed by the British, had been sent to seize the area of Geyve and İzmit, but they were repelled by the Turkish irregular forces. Subsequently, British aeroplanes bombed the Turkish positions in İzmit with little outcome. 3 regiments from the Kuva-yi Inzibatiye entrenched themselves at the outskirts of İzmit. Behind them were 2-3 British battalions and furthermore they were backed up by several British battleships from the sea. On 15 June, the Turkish nationalists tried to advance towards the Ottoman and British positions, but they made little progress, as British battleships and planes started to bomb them on 16–17 June.

== Offensive ==
Since they couldn't depend on the Kuva-yi Inzibatiye as the situation was a stalemate, the fighting around İzmit was key to the British deciding to bring in the Greek army for assistance and to punish the attacks on their troops. The Greeks, meanwhile, were eager to conquer their historical homeland. The British military staff together with the Greek military staff planned the offensive for the southern coastal area of the Sea of Marmara and the Aegean Region. With these plans the Greek army started its offensive on 22 June 1920.

During the offensive, British and Greek troops jointly captured the following towns, some of these towns were invaded by naval landing forces: Akhisar (22 June); Kırkağaç, Soma and Salihli (24 June); Alaşehir (25 June); Kula (28 June); Balıkesir (30 June); Bandırma, Kirmasti and Karacabey (2 July); Nazilli (3 July); Gemlik and Mudanya (6 July); Bursa (8 July); Karamürsel (11 July); İznik (12 July); Gediz and Ulubey (28 August); Uşak (29 August); Simav (3 September). During the offensive against these areas, several clashes occurred between the advancing British-Greek troops and the defending Turkish irregular forces. For example, Mudanya had been tried to be captured as early as 25 June by naval landing forces, but stubborn Turkish resistance inflicted casualties on British forces and forced them to withdraw. On 6 July a British fleet of 12 ships bombarded the town for three hours, killing 25 Turkish soldiers. After the bombardment British troops landed and took control of the town. There were many instances of successful delaying operations of small Turkish irregular forces against numerical superior enemy troops. Such as in Savaştepe when a Turkish irregular unit of 200 men delayed a Greek division of 10,000 men for one day.

By reaching Uşak on 29 June, the Greek army had advanced some 201 km (125 mi). Apart from these major settlements, several other smaller settlements were captured during the offensive.

== Aftermath ==
The Turkish nationalist forces started a small counter-attack in the area of Gediz, but it wasn't successful.

== Gallery ==
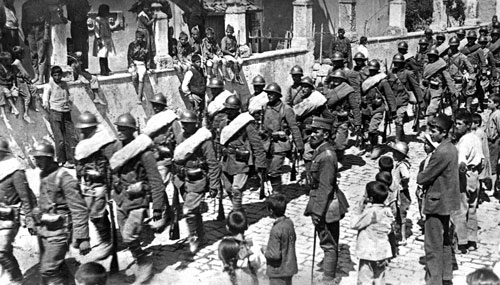
Greek troops in Mudanya.

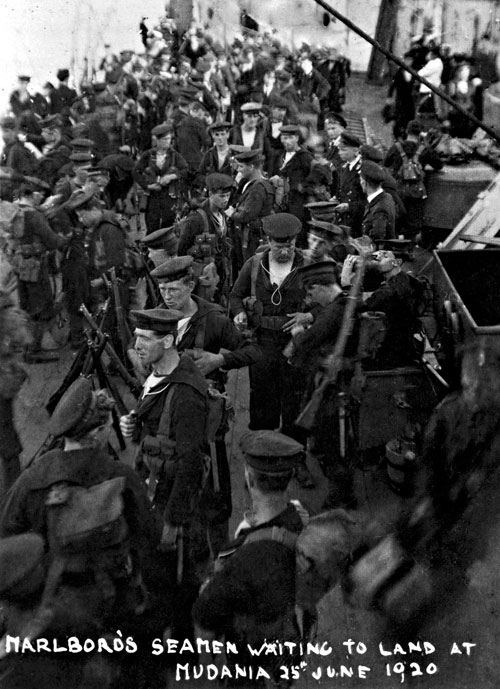
British landing at Mudanya, 25 June 1920.

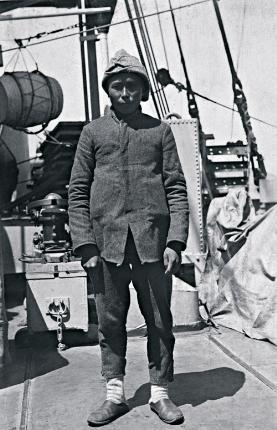
A captured nationalist Turkish soldier on board HMS Royal Sovereign during the assault on Mudanya, 6 July 1920.

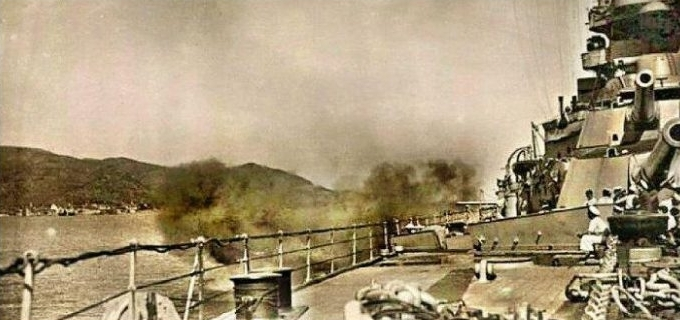
HMS Royal Sovereign's 6-inch guns in action bombarding Mudanya, 6 July 1920.

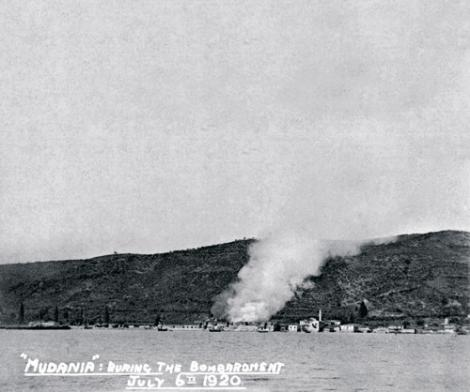
Burning caused by the bombardment, 6 July 1920, Mudanya.

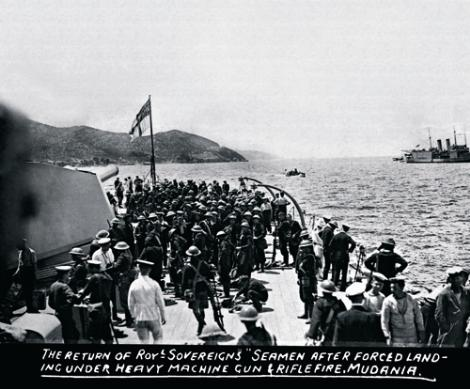
The return of HMS Royal Sovereign's seaman after forced landing under heavy machine gun & rifle fire. (Mudanya, July 1920)

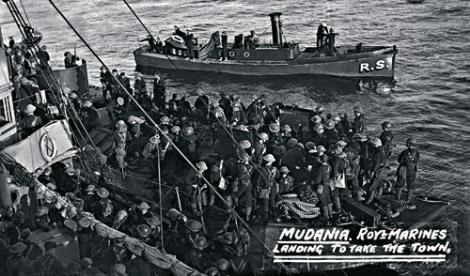
Royal Marines landing at Mudanya.

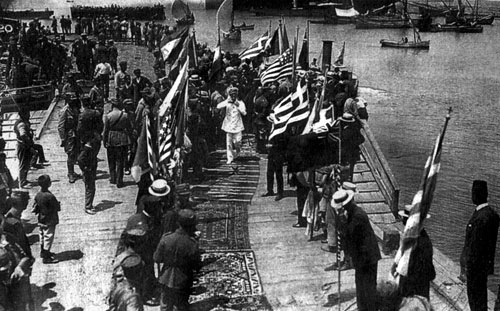
Greek and American troops landing at Bandirma (Panormos).

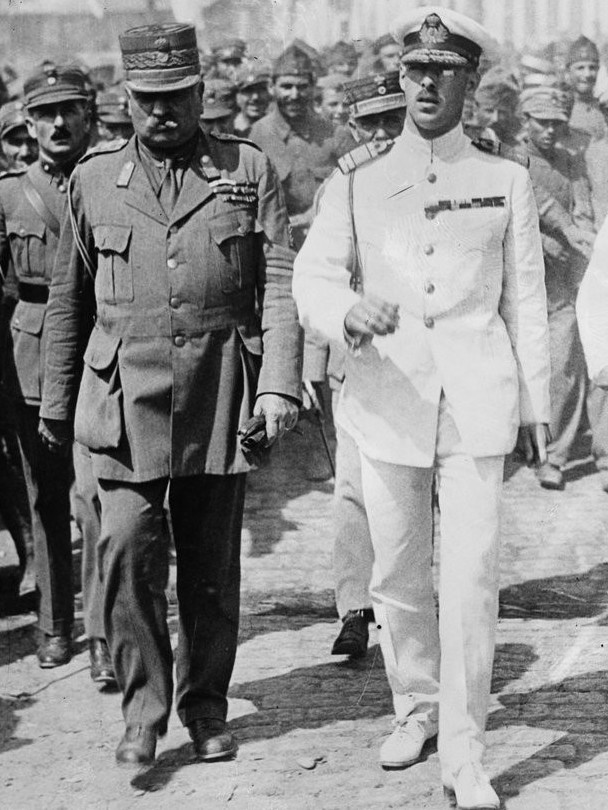
General Paraskevopoulos with King Alexander in Panormos.

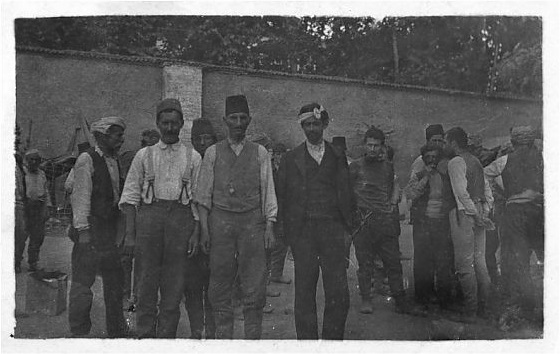
Turkish prisoners captured at Izmit by the British forces. The three men standing together at the front were accused to be the ringleaders and they were subsequently executed in June 1920.

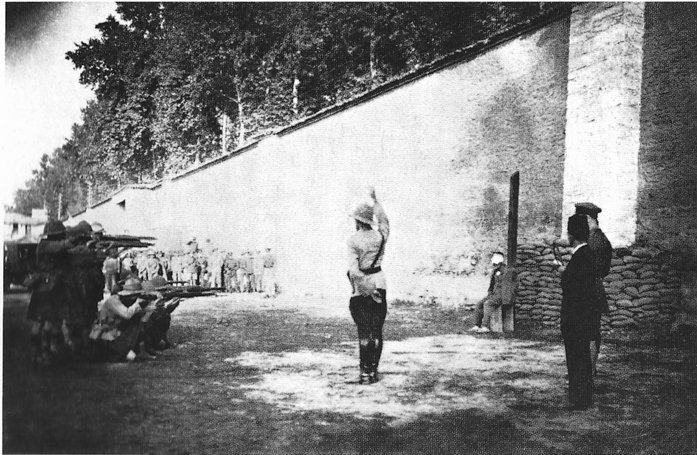
Execution of a Kemalist Turk, by the British forces in Izmit.

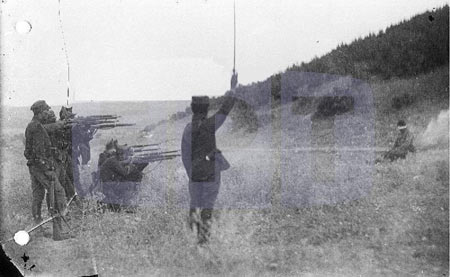
Turkish man who was accused of spying for the Turkish army is executed by Greek troops.

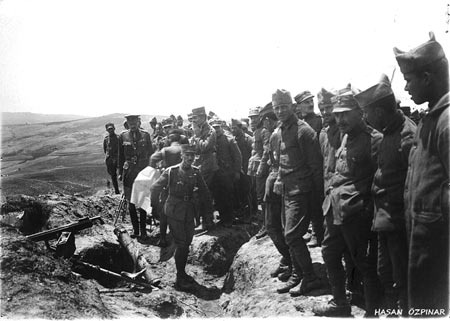
British officer inspecting Greek troops and trenches.

== See also ==
- Great Offensive
- HMS Ramillies (07)
- HMS Royal Sovereign (05)

== Sources ==
- Sinan Meydan: Cumhuriyet Tarihi yalanları: Yoksa siz de mi kandırıldınız?..., İnkılâp, 2010, ISBN 9751030544, pages 332–352. (in Turkish)
