= Battle of Smyrna =

Battle of Smyrna may refer to:

- Smyrniote crusades (1343–51)
- Siege of Smyrna (1402)
- Greek landing at Smyrna (1919)
- Great Smyrna Offensive (1922)
- Turkish capture of Smyrna (1922)

== See also ==
- Occupation of Smyrna (1919–22)
- Great Fire of Smyrna (1922)
- Smyrna, Georgia, site of a battle of the American Civil War (1864)
