= Battle of Aydın =

Conflicts in the Greco-Turkish War

- Part of the Greco-Turkish War (1919–22)
- A backstreet in the Turkish part of Aydın in the early 20th century
Date	June 27 – July 4, 1919
Location	Aydın, Aidin Vilayet
Result	Greek victory

Belligerents
(Kingdom of Greece) Greece	Kuva-i Milliye

Commanders and leaders
Georgios Kondilis; Colonel Schinas; Colonel Stavrianopoulos	Yörük Ali Efe

Strength
2 regiments (~3,000 men)	1,920 infantry and 17 cavalry

Casualties and losses
Unknown	Unknown

The Battle of Aydın (Turkish: Aydın Muharebesi or Aydın Savunması, literally: "Defence of Aydın") was a series of wide-scale armed conflicts and military engagements fought between 27 June and 4 July 1919 in and around the city of Aydın during the initial phase of the Greco-Turkish War (1919–1922). The conflict was triggered by the advance of the Greek Army into the Menderes Valley and subsequent resistance by local Turkish irregular forces (Kuva-yi Milliye). The battle resulted in the destruction of large portions of the city by fire, heavy civilian casualties on both sides, and widespread displacement of the local population.

== Background ==
Aydın was a central town of the fertile Menderes River (Meander) valley in western Turkey. Although Menderes River valley was not mandated for an occupation by Greek troops by the Paris Peace Conference, 1919, Italian Navy's movements off the coast of Kuşadası had oriented the Greek high command towards becoming the first power to establish an influence in this region.

=== Extension of occupation zone ===
The Greek High Commissioner Aristidis Stergiadis, who had arrived in Smyrna on 21 May, authorised on 23 May the troops commanded by Colonel Nikolaos Zafeiriou to issue orders for the occupation of Aydın, Manisa and Turgutlu. The subject of the size of the territory to be occupied by Greek forces were to be governed by uncertainty until 2 June, when Commodore Maurice FitzMaurice from the Royal Navy was appointed to determine the limits of the occupation zone.

== Active stage ==
After its occupation of Smyrna, the Greek army had started to advance into inner Western Anatolia from the first day of their landing at Smyrna and the incursion had extended into the Menderes valley in the second week of the occupation. Aydın, the central city of the region, was occupied on 27 May.

=== Initial Armed conflicts, 27 June ===
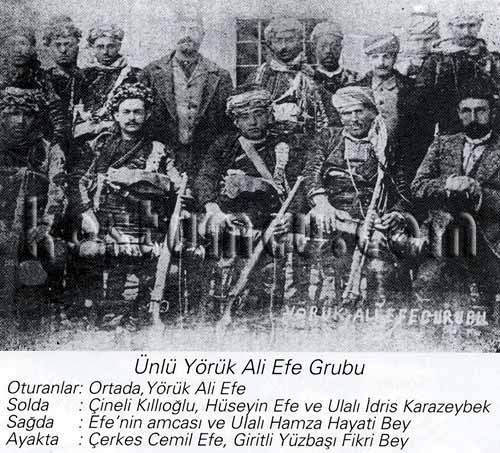
The group of efe led by Yörük Ali during the battle. The group committed multiple massacres, rapes and other crimes against Greek civilians.

The warfare around Aydın started by an ambush on 27 June of a Greek patrol by irregular Turkish forces led by Yörük Ali Efe at Malgaç train station, south of Aydın.

=== Massacres 27 June–4 July and the Inter-Allied Commission ===
The Inter-Allied Commission, headed by Mark L. Bristol, investigated the massacres in the city. The report it produced placed blame on both sides, but primarily on the Greek side. Eleftherios Venizelos accused the Commission of bias and of condemning Greece without giving them an opportunity to defend themselves. Nevertheless, Venizelos made sure to punish Greek soldiers who were found guilty of atrocities. The Greek observer, Colonel Alexandros Mazarakis-Ainian, later wrote his own separate report on the massacres, including witnesses who were refused a hearing by the Commission.

Venizelos' claims of bias have been mostly corroborated by modern research. The report's conclusions are, indeed, considered unreliable firstly because the commission was headed by pro-Turkish rear admiral Mark L. Bristol, who "had already reached his conclusion months before the investigation", and secondly because "the Turks went to great lengths to document Greek atrocities and sanitize reports of their own". There is also evidence that Bristol's intelligence officer, Robert Steed Dunn, had skewed the report against Greece.

Greek civilian boy scout executed by Turkish irregulars in Aydin, 1 July 1919. During the short-term temporary occupation of the city by Turkish irregulars, Boy Scouts of Greek descent were captured and massacred, with some being flayed alive.

In addition, according to historians Benny Morris and Dror Ze'evi: "[t]he commission made no mention of some 3,000 Aydın Greeks—men, women, and children—who were murdered, nor of 800 women and children deported inland". In the city, irregular Turks had "torched the Greek quarter and massacred the remaining inhabitants".

George William Rendel, a contemporary to the events, reported on the massacres of the Turks against the Greeks:

The greater part of its [Aydın's] inhabitants were killed, some being shot, others pierced with red hot irons, others cut to pieces and others put to death with the cruelest tortures. The inhabitants’ property was plundered, virgins were carried off to the mountains, and Aydin is a vast cemetery. After the destruction of Aydin 800 women and children were sent off by railway to Nazli and Denizli on June 18th and 19th 1919.

Historian Heinz A. Richter also agrees with the above assessments, stating that the Commission's report exaggerated reports of Greek excesses and showed biased anti-Greek tendencies.

Turkish sources instead report that 1,500 to 3,000 Turkish civilians were massacred, approximately 10,000 to 15,000 Turkish residents fled the area, and 80 percent of the city—primarily the Turkish quarter—was destroyed by arson. However, Morris and Ze'evi note:

The Turks also accused the Greek army of levelling Aydın town and massacring civilians there. But the story was more complicated. When Turkish irregulars retook the town in July, armed locals joined in, firing from rooftops and windows at the retreating Greeks. In retaliation, they set fire to the Turkish quarter. The Turks then torched the Greek quarter and massacred the remaining inhabitants. Even Toynbee refused to sugarcoat what the Turks did to Greek noncombatants: “Women and children were hunted like rats from house to house, and civilians [...] were slaughtered in batches—shot or knifed or hurled over a cliff. [...] Many of the women... were violated.”

=== Reoccupation, 4 July ===
The Greek troops, with the help of reinforcements sent by General Konstantinos Nider, headed by lieutenant Colonel Stavrianopoulos recaptured Aydın on 4 July. The reoccupation of Aydın was ordered by the Greek High Command in spite of the express orders of the representative of the Entente. The Greek authorities acted on orders received from Venizelos in Paris on 2 July. These orders prevented the representative of the Entente from intervening in the matter.

== Aftermath ==
Before the Greek army returned to Aydın, most of the Turkish population had already left the town and surrounding area, with the Turkish soldiers, in order to take refuge in the Italian zone or in the Nazilli-Denizli region, where they remained till the end of the war.

On the other hand, the Greek population of the town was either massacred by the Turks (the dead bodies found by the Greek army after the retake of the town), or taken to captivity in the interior of Anatolia.

Colonel Georgios Kondylis with his regiment took orders to hunt the Turkish perpetrators and did so by passing the Meander river and entering the Italian zone.

=== End of hostilities ===
The city of Aydın remained in ruins. It was re-captured by the Turkish army on 7 September 1922, at the end of the Greco-Turkish War (1919-1922).

== See also ==
- Turkish War of Independence
- Greco-Turkish War (1919-1922)
- Chronology of the Turkish War of Independence
- Occupation of Smyrna
- Menemen massacre
- The Greek genocide
- King–Crane Commission
- Alexandros Mazarakis-Ainian
