= USS Bristol =

USS Bristol has been the name of two ships of the United States Navy, named in honor of Rear Admiral Mark Lambert Bristol.

- USS Bristol (DD-453), a Gleaves-class destroyer commissioned in 1941 and sunk off Algeria in 1943
- USS Bristol (DD-857), an Allen M. Sumner-class destroyer commissioned in 1945 and served until late 1969 after which it was then transferred to Taiwan

USS Bristol may also refer to:

- USS Arthur L. Bristol (DE-281), a United States Navy destroyer escort converted during construction into the high-speed transport USS Arthur L. Bristol (APD-97)
- USS Arthur L. Bristol (APD-97), a United States Navy high-speed transport in commission from 1945 to 1946
