= General Torkom =

Armenian military leader (1878–1953)

Arsen Arshag Hariton Nakashian
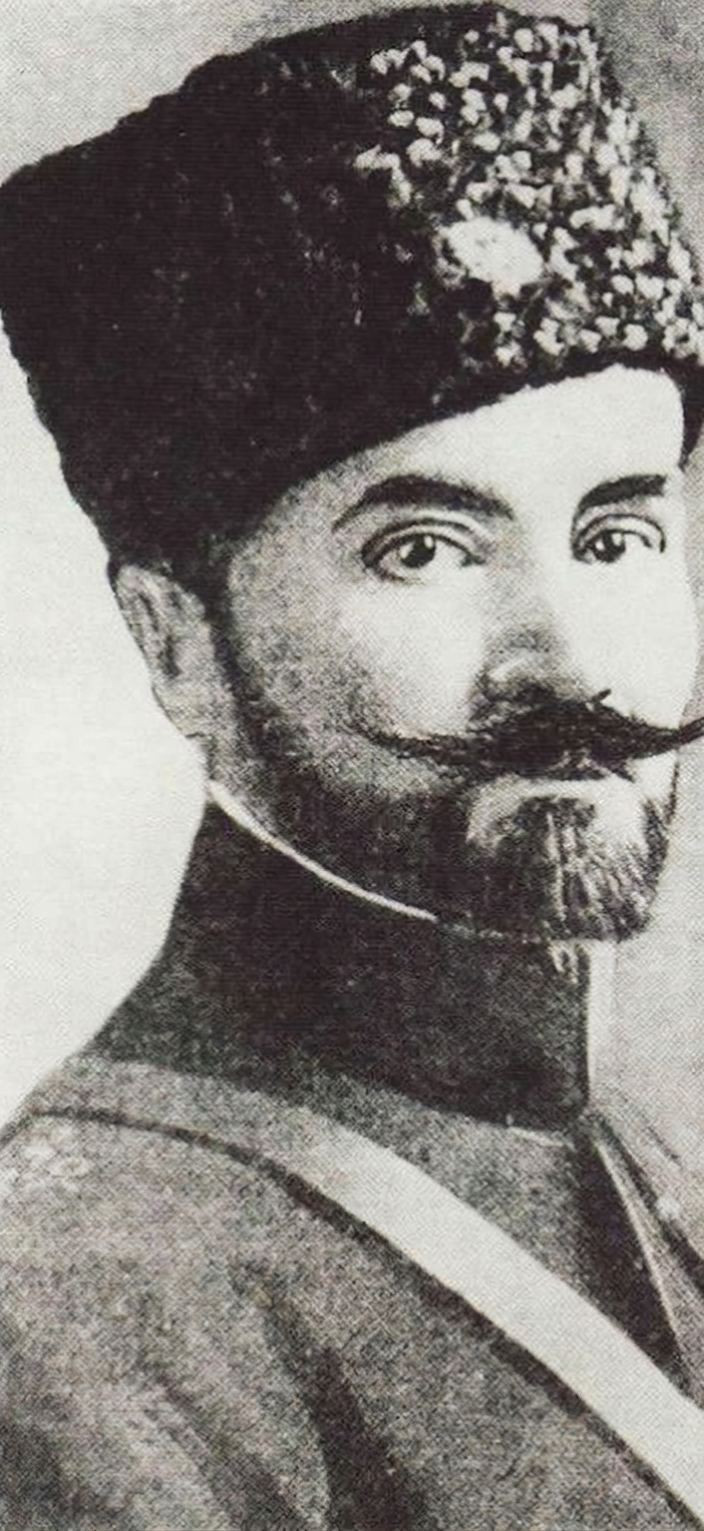
- Born: 1878; Kayseri Province, Ottoman Empire
- Died: 1953 (aged 74–75); Paris, France
- Military career
- Allegiance: (Tsardom of Bulgaria (1908–1946)) Kingdom of Bulgaria (1912–1913) (Russian Empire) Imperial Russia (1914–1917); Russian Republic (1917–1918); First Republic of Armenia (1918–1920); Kingdom of Greece (1921–1922); Francoist Spain (1936–1939) (?)
- Nickname: General Torkom
- Conflicts: First Balkan War; World War I Greco-Turkish War (1919–1922); Spanish Civil War (?)

Arsen Arshag Hariton Nakashian (Note: Other sources give different surnames for the subject. Variants include Baghdasaryan, Yervandyan, Torkomyan. One source gives his full name as Ardash Hachik Kaptanian. It is unknown whether these names are variations, nicknames or if they refer to the same person.) (1878–1953), more commonly known by his nom de guerre General Torkom, was an Armenian military leader who notably commanded the volunteer "Armenian Legion" of the Greek Army during the Greco-Turkish War.

== Biography ==
=== Early life ===
General Torkom was born in 1878, in the Kayseri Province of the Ottoman Empire. His father was assassinated when he was 12 years old in Cilicia, forcing his family to move to Bulgaria, subsequently becoming a citizen of the country.

In 1903 he graduated from a Bulgarian military academy as a second lieutenant. According to Esat Uras, in 1905, Torkom allegedly participated in the assassination attempt on Abdulhamid II. Either way, in 1907, he attended the prestigious Saint-Cyr Military Academy. Afterwards he served with the Swiss Army, receiving training in various fields.

=== Balkan Wars and World War I ===
Before the First Balkan War, Torkom noted that the reasons why he went to Switzerland to train was partly because: "At that time, in the Balkans, we were preparing for a war against Turkey in order to liberate Macedonia". Torkom served in the First Balkan War, as an officer of the Bulgarian Army, with distinction. He was seriously wounded in one of the battles. Before the Second Balkan War, Torkom advised the Bulgarian government not to attack Serbia, but he was ignored. Torkom believed in a sort of Balkan Federation. He healed from his injuries in November 1913.

In 1914, at the beginning of World War I, Torkom sought to prevent Bulgaria from joining the Central Powers and tried to persuade them to join the Entente instead. When the Bulgarian government rejected his advice once more, Torkom resigned from the Bulgarian Army, left the country, and entered the Russian Army to fight against the Central Powers, where he served with distinction from 1914 until 1917 and was wounded thrice. By 1915, Torkom had established contacts with the British government. He devised a plan to recruit Armenian volunteers to fight against the Ottoman Empire in the Dardanelles and sent its details to diplomat George Buchanan. Buchanan forwarded the telegram to Harold Nicolson who dismissed it as "hardly more practicable than the many other irresponsible offers that have reached us". Four days later, the Embassy of Russia in London submitted the same plan on behalf of Torkom, but it was again rejected, this time by Lancelot Oliphant, after the latter had informed the Permanent Joint Headquarters about it.

After the Bolshevik Revolution, Torkom tried to seek support from Great Britain and France in order to organize an Armenian military force, but failed to gain either country's support. In January 1918, he gathered all available Armenian military forces in Erzurum and proclaimed the independence of Armenia. After this event, he was expelled from the city by Ilia Odishelidze.

=== Formation of the "Armenian Legion" in the Greek Army ===
My officers and I shall be proud and happy if we are able to serve beneath the banners of the glorious Greek Army. I have come here in order to renew our ancient traditions, according to which Greeks and Armenians fought together against the barbarians. Thus history repeats itself. Cruelly abandoned by the indescribably selfish policy of the Great Powers, Armenia now places its hopes in the final victory of Greek arms. Surrounded on all sides by numerous enemies and isolated because of its geographical position, Armenia, mortally wounded, has allowed its sword to fall. Yet we firmly hope that we shall raise that sword again through the help of Greek–Armenian brotherhood. Asia Minor has for many centuries been watered with Greek and Armenian blood. It belongs to us, regardless of what the Turks may do or what Europe may think today. I am deeply convinced that, sooner or later, death knell shall sound for the Turks on some plain of Anatolia, where the Greek and Armenian armies will congratulate one another before the defeated corpse of the barbarian murderers. In preparation for that future, which should become our common and shared destiny, I hope that wherever there is a Greek and an Armenian, they will raise their voices as one man and proclaim the inalienable rights of Greece and Armenia in Asia Minor.

— General Torkom, 10 April 1922 interview

Torkom is most notable for joining the Greek Army and creating an "Armenian Legion" composed of 2,500 Armenians. This legion was placed directly under the Commander-in-Chief of the Army of Asia Minor.

The idea of Greek–Armenian military cooperation dated back to the beginning of 1919, following meetings held in London between General Torkom, the Greek Prime Minister Eleftherios Venizelos, and the Greek diplomatic representative Dimitrios Kaklamanos. During these meetings the three men discussed the formation of a force consisting of three Armenian divisions and one division of Pontic Greeks. Two years later, now under the new Greek Prime Minister Dimitrios Gounaris, Torkom received permission to create the Armenian Legion. During April and May 1922, the Legion was stationed in Balçova, near Smyrna, with plans for reinforcements with another 6,000 Armenian volunteers from Constantinople, Bursa and Syria. However, the dismissal of Anastasios Papoulas brought these plans to an end.

=== Smyrna ===
You are bound to ask the following question: How was it that, in the midst of a general collapse, the Armenian Legion remained at its post despite so many hardships, without disintegrating? The answer is simple: whenever a military force possesses spirit and faith in its commander, it can, and must, perform miracles.

— General Torkom, 1929 report

In August 1922, the Greek front totally collapsed after the Battle of Dumlupinar. Torkom and his legionnaires entered the Armenian quarter of Smyrna, rounded up all Armenian men capable of bearing arms, and brought them to the Legion's camp at Kilizman. However, Armenian Archbishop Levon Tourian and several prominent Armenians asked Aristeidis Stergiadis for the release of these men and the disbandment of the legion. Stergiadis forwarded the request to the new Commander-in-Chief of the Greek Army and Papoulas' replacement, Georgios Hatzianestis, who ordered Torkom to disarm the Armenian Legion and abandon Asia Minor without a fight on 1 September 1922. On 6 September 1922, Torkom officially replied to Hatzianestis' order: "The Armenian Legion was created upon the foundations of Greek–Armenian brotherhood. It refuses to leave Asia Minor without a fight. My men and I respectfully request that we be sent immediately to the front, so that Europe may learn that Greeks and Armenians are fighting side by side in Asia Minor, and that Greek–Armenian brotherhood must become even stronger in the future". In a 1929 report, Torkom stated on this incident: "For the first time in my military career I disobeyed an order given by my superior".

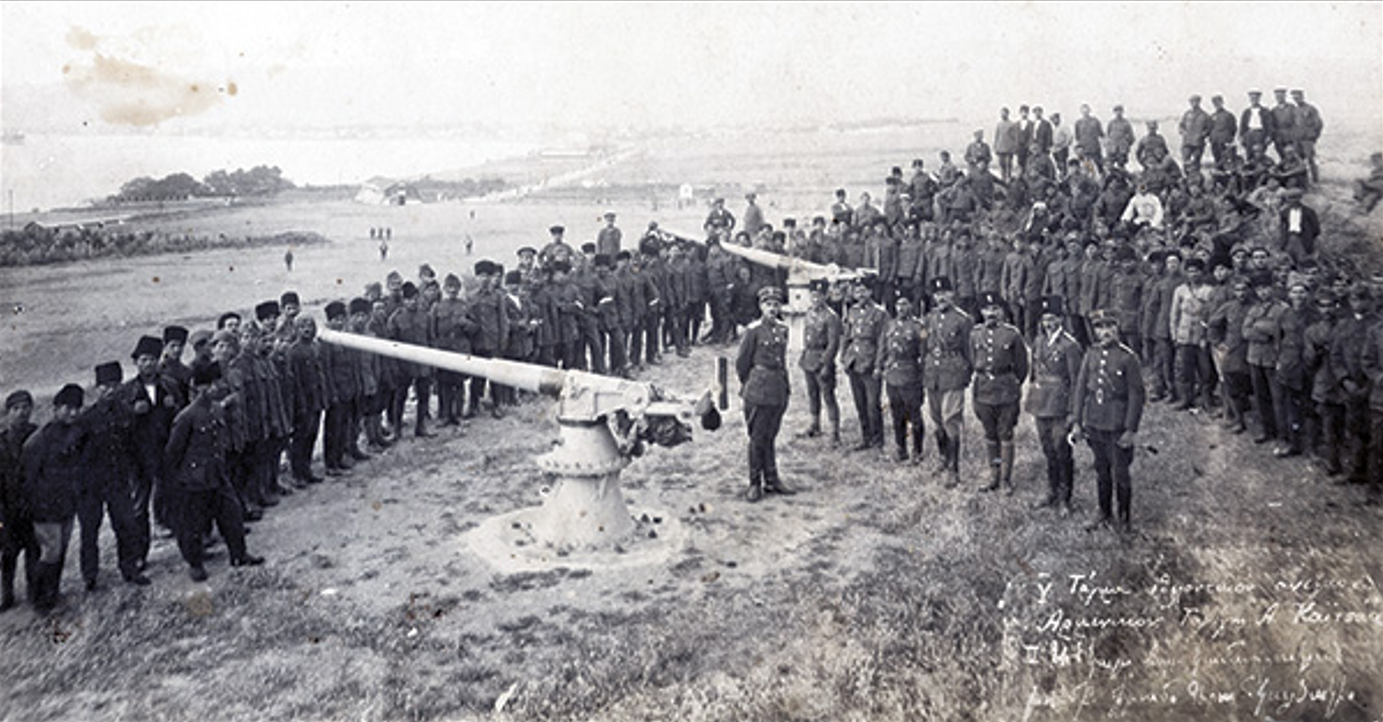
The "Armenian Legion" of the Greek Army on the outskirts of Smyrna, 1922.

Between 3 and 5 September 1922, the Armenian Legion was arming itself "to the teeth" with weapons, which had been abandoned by retreating Greek units. Unlike the main Greek forces, the Legion refused to withdraw immediately toward Çeşme, believing it had a duty to cover the retreat of approximately 40,000 Greek civilian refugees fleeing from the interior of Asia Minor. On 8–9 September, the Legion held positions between Halkapınar and Bornova, repelling attacks by irregular Turkish forces and protecting around 2,000 sick and wounded Greek soldiers who had been unable to retreat with the main army.

In the morning of 9 September, as the regular Kemalist Army entered Karşıyaka, the Legion retreated to the harbor. Young men hiding in Greek homes joined the Legion as it advanced. Passing through the Turkish quarter, the Legion fought a brief engagement before continuing toward Çeşme, where Nikolaos Plastiras was conducting the final defensive actions of the Greek Army. To Plastiras' surprise, the Armenian Legion arrived and joined him. Together, they formed the rearguard protecting the embarkation of tens of thousands of refugees and continued fighting irregulars until roughly half an hour before regular Kemalist forces reached the city's waterfront.

==== Eyewitness accounts ====
Several witnesses talked about Torkom and his Legion's heroism. Photographer Manolis Megalokonomos reported:

Half an hour before the Turks entered Smyrna, a large military unit of Armenians marched with steady step along the stone-paved quay, wearing the uniform of the Greek soldier, bayonets fixed, led by General Torkom riding a white horse, with a headscarf, the traditional covering of Armenian revolutionaries. In front marched two standard-bearers carrying the Greek and Armenian flags. Many eyes filled with tears as people watched with hope this force advancing toward the Turkish quarters and the government offices. The people of Smyrna warned them that the Turks had prepared ambushes. "We are not afraid of them", they replied. Fighting every step of the way, they succeeded in reaching Çeşme. These were the last flags, the Greek and the Armenian, to pass proudly along the waterfront of Smyrna. The people of Smyrna owe gratitude to these comrades, these Armenian warriors.

Journalist Konstantinos Athanatos wrote of the same incident:

Flags were fluttering, and troops were advancing toward the quay known as the "Café de la Paix", marching in military order toward the Hunters' Club. Everyone was electrified. At least one hundred thousand people had gathered, and as one body they instinctively turned their eyes in that direction. "It is our victorious army!". What a stirring of emotion in those hearts, bruised by defeat. Tall and proud, with his golden epaulettes and moustache, at the head of the few remaining volunteers of his compatriots marched the Armenian General Torkom. He had ordered his men to march beneath the folds of two flags, the Greek and the Armenian. The moment was so moving that the crowd burst into tears. This Armenian battalion, which had fought heroically in its sector, halted briefly to rest in the little garden of the Sporting Club, and then continued its march toward Çeşme, as the last rearguard still carrying life with it. By then, the sense of dread had reached its climax. There was no hope left, no refuge.

=== Later life and death ===
Following the Burning of Smyrna, Torkom went to Chios and then moved to Athens, where he settled together with the Armenian Legion. In November 1922, the Legion underwent its final review and was officially disbanded.

Torkom lived in Athens until 1936, where he created the Greek–Armenian Association. The Association's honorary president was Georgios Kondylis.

Torkom, alongside "some nationalist Armenian adventurers" allegedly participated in the Spanish Civil War on the Nationalist side; only one testimony confirms this, whose credibility is not certain. Torkom supposedly offered to bring 300,000 Armenians to Spain to fight for Francisco Franco, because "Spain was fighting for the very same goals as had the first Armenian republic in 1918–20".

Whether or not Torkom's Spanish journey actually happened, he later moved to Italy, and finally settled in Paris, where he died in 1953.
