= Turkish capture of Smyrna =

Final phase of the Great Offensive and the last battle of the Turkish War of Independence

Liberation of İzmir
- Part of the Greco-Turkish War (1919–22)
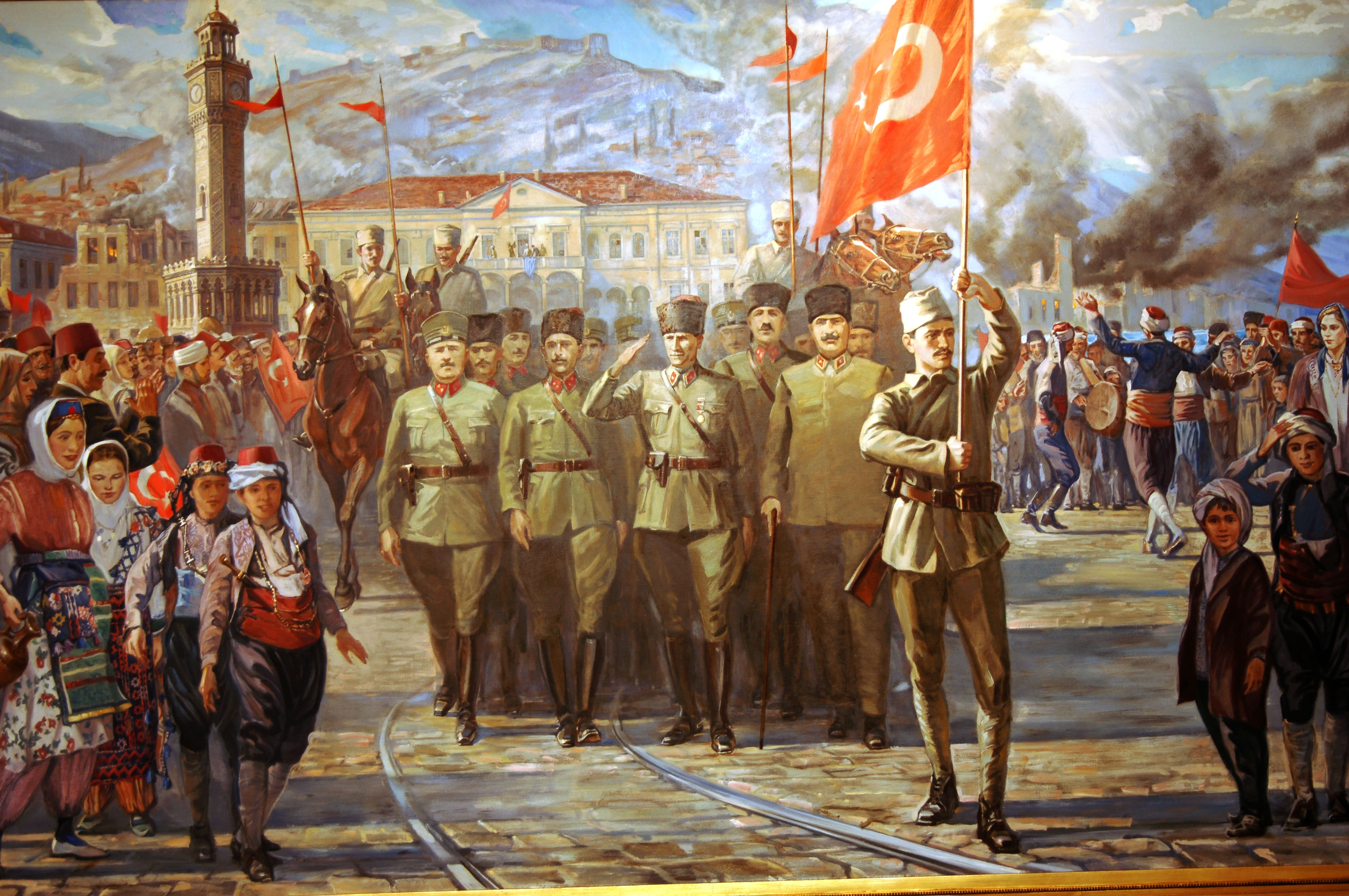
- Turkish cavalry entering İzmir
Date	9 September 1922
Location	İzmir, Turkey
Result	Turkish capture of Smyrna: Armistice of Mudanya; Great fire of Smyrna
Territorial changes	Greek withdrawal from Anatolia

Belligerents
Ankara Government	(Kingdom of Greece) Greece

Commanders and leaders
Mustafa Kemal Pasha; Fahrettin Pasha; Mürsel Pasha; Colonel Ahmet Zeki; Colonel Mehmet Suphi	Aristeidis Stergiadis; Nikolaos Plastiras; General Torkom

Strength
1st Cavalry Division; 2nd Cavalry Division; 14th Cavalry Division; Total: 9,100 – 9,200	40,000 (4 divisions)

The Turkish capture of Smyrna or the Liberation of İzmir (Turkish: İzmir'in Kurtuluşu) marked the end of the 1919–1922 Greco-Turkish War, and the culmination of the Turkish War of Independence. On 9 September 1922, following the headlong retreat of the Greek army after its defeat at the Battle of Dumlupınar and its evacuation from western Anatolia, the Turkish 5th Cavalry Corps under the command of Major-General Fahrettin Altay within the Turkish Army under the command of Mustafa Kemal Pasha marched into the city of Smyrna (modern İzmir), bringing three years of Greek occupation to an end.

== Accounts of capture ==
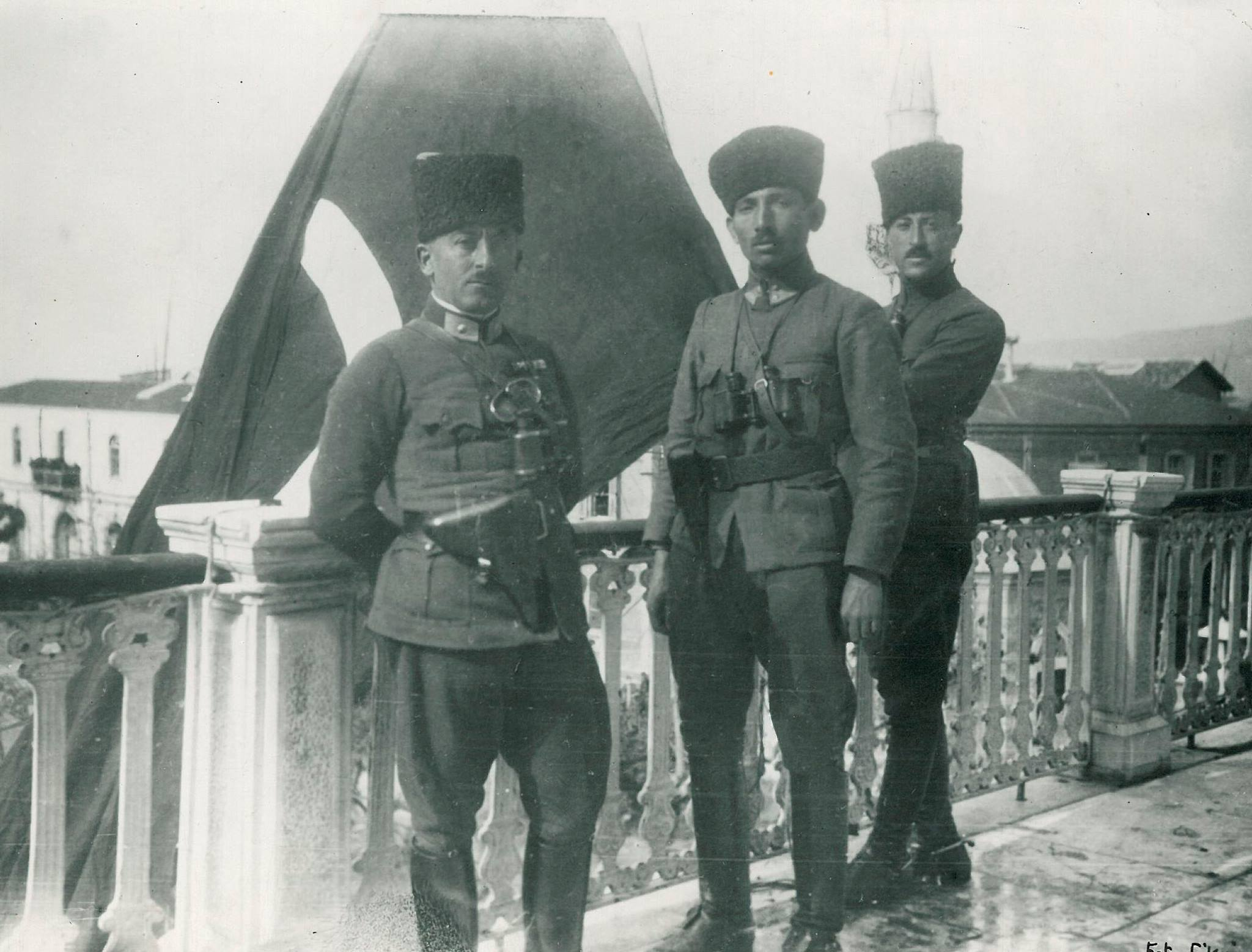
Turkish Cavalry Officers of the 4th Regiment, 2nd Cavalry Division with their Regimental Flag: Captain Şerafettin (İzmir), Lieutenant Hamdi (Yurteri) and Lieutenant Ali Rıza (Akıncı) who hoisted the first Turkish Flag to the Konak Building on the morning of 9 September 1922.

Accounts of the Turkish entry vary in sources. According to Giles Milton, the first Turkish unit to enter the city on 9 September was a cavalry troop that was met by Captain Thesiger of HMS King George V. Captain Thesiger in his report inaccurately stated that he spoke to the 3rd Cavalry Regiment's commander. In reality he spoke with the 13th Cavalry Regiment's commander with Lieutenant Colonel Atıf Esenbel within the 2nd Cavalry Division, as the 3rd Regiment under the command of Colonel Ferit was in Karşıyaka under the 14th Cavalry Division. The inaccuracy of British reports throughout the war was also remarked by the British Prime Minister Lloyd George. Lieutenant Ali Rıza Akıncı's unit also met with a British officer in a car on the railroad tracks near the sea. The officer told them not to enter the city, yet they did not listen and continued their march. At the moment they entered the Kordon, they encountered a French captain in a black automobile who urged them to be quick and shouted the following: "Hurry, your homeland is about to be burned. The Armenians will burn the city, save the people, occupy the city at once." The Cavalry continued their march. On their road thousands of Greek soldiers and officers as well as irregulars were throwing their weapons and surrendering. Though a tense stand-off ensued and a grenade, which failed to explode, was tossed at the feet of the Turkish cavalry officer (the grenade thrower is also mentioned by George Horton as "some fool threw a bomb", and that the commander of the unit "received bloody cuts about the head.") Grace Williamson, of the city's English Nursing Home, remarked, "What a week we have spent!! I believe there was hardly a bit of trouble, only one silly fellow fired at the officers ... No shooting in the streets!" Captain Şerafettin's horse died as a result of the grenade wounds. Unlike Horton and Williamson, Captain Şerafettin does not use the words fool or silly and mentions the grenade thrower as a civilian who had a sword in his belt. The grenade also wounded the captain.

Lieutenant Ali Rıza Akıncı, the first Turkish officer to hoist the Turkish flag in Smyrna (present day Izmir) on the 9th of September, and his unit of thirteen cavalrymen were ambushed by a volley of fire by 30-40 rifles from the Tuzakoğlu factory after being saluted and congratulated by a French Marine platoon in the Halkapınar bridge. This volley of fire killed 3 cavalrymen instantly and fatally wounded another. They were relieved by Captain Şerafettin and his 2 units, which encircled the factory. Moreover, Captain Şerafettin, as well as Lieutenant Ali Rıza Akıncı, were wounded by a grenade thrown by a Greek irregular in front of the Pasaport building. The lieutenant was wounded lightly in his nose and his leg, and his horse in its belly. A monument was later erected on the spot where these cavalrymen had fallen. Pockets of resistance continued; a Turkish Cavalryman was wounded by rifle shots coming from the houses in Kokaryalı neighbourhood.

General of the Fifth Cavalry Corps Fahrettin Altay claims that on 10 September Turkish forces belonging to the 2nd and the 3rd Cavalry Divisions detained 3,000 Greek soldiers, 50 Greek Officers, and a brigadier commander in the south of the city centre, who were retreating from Aydın while the ones with horses were able to escape to Çeşme. Greek soldier Vasilis Diamantopoulos, who in 1922 was among the units that retreated from Aydın, after the local Greeks and other Christians left the city without their belongings and also burnt their own homes so the Turks wouldn't find them intact, was captured along with his entire 18th regiment which was commanded by Colonel Zenginis on the evening of 10 September by the Turkish regular cavalry. Only the left guard unit of Major Vamvakopoulos' battalion was able to escape except the units under the command of Captain Katsikas which surrendered on the 11th of September. 4th Cavalry Regiment under the command of Filibeli Kaymakam-Major Ali Reşat Bey within the 2nd Cavalry Division were among the troops that captured Zenginis and his units. Diamantopoulos however, claimed that a day later the prisoners that were sent away to Manisa amounted to 3,500.

General Nikolaos Plastiras, alongside General Torkom, conducted the final defensive operations of the Greek Army in Smyrna against irregulars and managed to evacuate thousands of Greek civilian refugees, stopping operations only thirty minutes before the Turks reached the harbor.

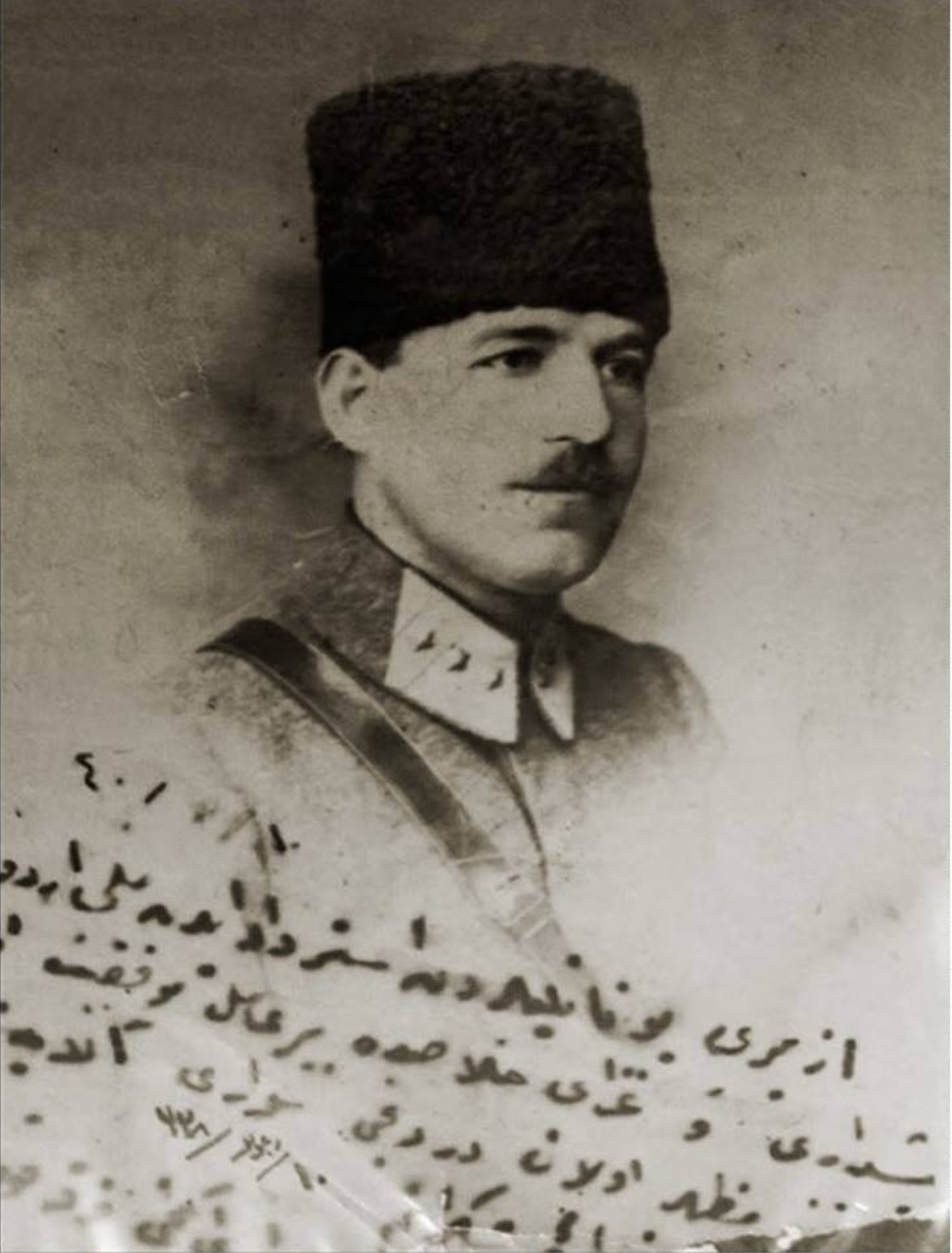
Handwritten letter of thanks given by Colonel Ahmet Zeki (Soydemir) to Captain Şerafeddin (İzmir) in the 4th Cavalry Regiment. "My thanks to the 4th Cavalry Regiment, which was the vanguard of the National Army that reclaimed İzmir from the Greeks, and to the success in the War of Salvation. 10/September/1922. 2nd Cavalry Division Commander."

== Fire in the city ==
Just a few days after its capture, a massive fire broke out, consuming the city's Armenian and Greek neighbourhoods. The Jewish and Muslim quarters were not damaged in the fire.

== Legacy ==
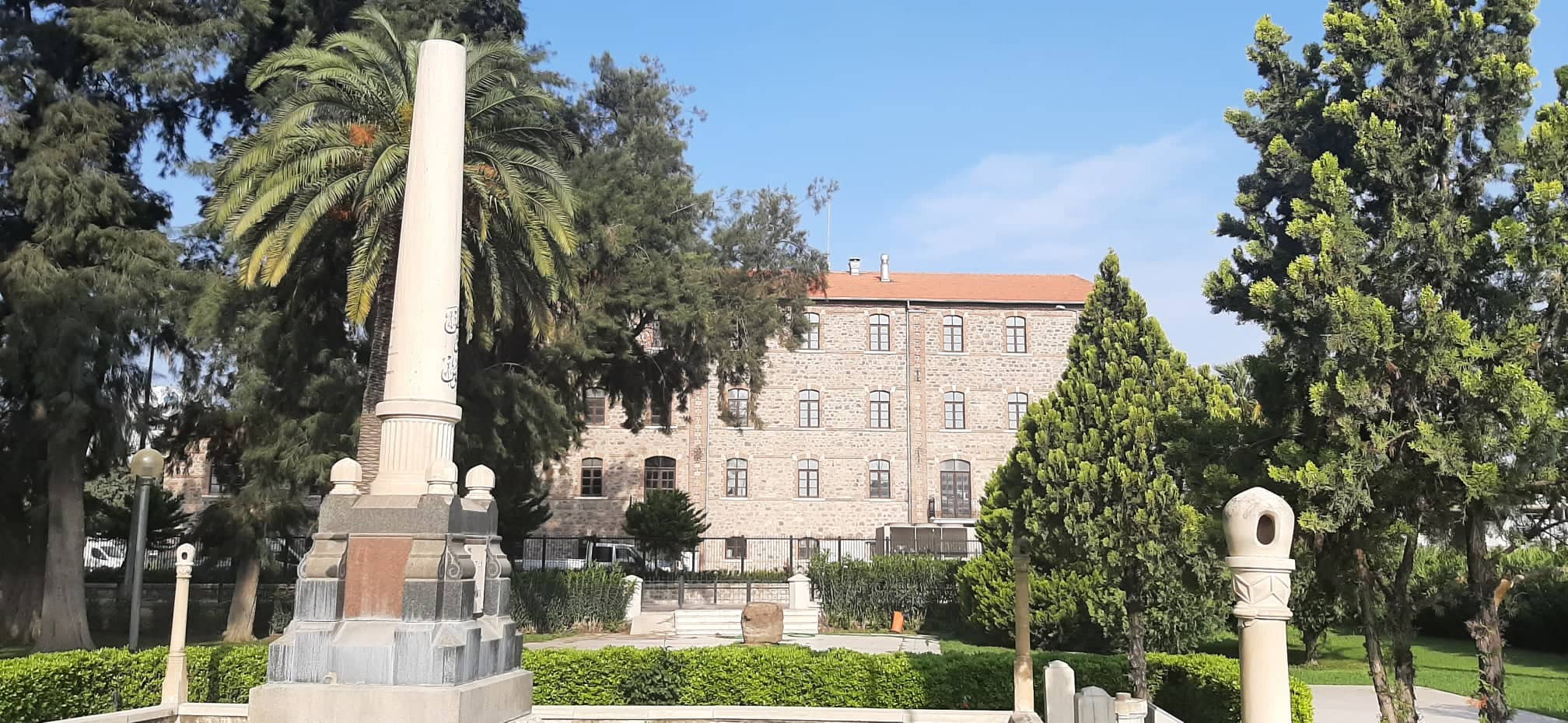
The Monument of Homeland and Honour and the Tuzakoğlu Flour Factory

9 September is a local holiday commemorating the Turkish capture of Smyrna. 9 September is a local holiday commemorating the Turkish capture of Smyrna. It marks the 104th anniversary of the liberation. Dokuz Eylül University (9 September University) is named in honour of it. Mustafa Kemal (later Atatürk), who founded the Republican People's Party, chose 9 September 1923 as the official date of establishment of his party to commemorate the capture. Between 2003 and 2010 the Turkish State Railways operated an overnight train from İzmir to Ankara named the 9th of September Express.

== See also ==
- Outline and timeline of the Greek genocide
- Greek landing at Smyrna
- On the Quai at Smyrna (Hemingway story)
- Fire of İzmir
