= Occupation of Smyrna =

Greek administration of the area around Smyrna/İzmir (1919–1922)

Zone of Smyrna Ζώνη Σμύρνης
- Dependency of Greece
- 1919–1922
- Flag Coat of arms

- Capital: Smyrna
- Government
- High Commissioner
  - 1919–1922: Aristeidis Stergiadis
- Historical era: Greco-Turkish War (1919–1922)
  - Landing at Smyrna: 15 May 1919
  - Captured by Turkish forces: 9 September 1922
Preceded by	Succeeded by
Vilayet of Smyrna	Government of the Grand National Assembly
- Today part of: Turkey

The city of Smyrna (modern-day İzmir) and surrounding areas were under Greek military occupation from 15 May 1919 until 9 September 1922. The Allied Powers authorized the occupation and creation of the Zone of Smyrna (Greek: Ζώνη Σμύρνης, romanized: Zóni Smýrnis) during negotiations regarding the partition of the Ottoman Empire to protect the ethnic Greek population living in and around the city. The Greek landing on 15 May 1919 was celebrated by the substantial local Greek population but quickly resulted in ethnic violence in the area. This violence decreased international support for the occupation and led to a rise in Turkish nationalism. The high commissioner of Smyrna, Aristeidis Stergiadis, firmly opposed discrimination against the Turkish population by the administration, stabilizing the situation; however, ethnic tensions and discrimination remained. Stergiadis also began work on projects involving resettlement of Greek refugees, the foundations for a university, and some public health projects. Smyrna was a major base of operations for Greek troops in Anatolia during the Greco-Turkish War (1919–1922).

The Greek occupation of Smyrna ended on 9 September 1922 with the Turkish capture of Smyrna by troops commanded by Mustafa Kemal Atatürk. After the Turkish advance on Smyrna, a mob murdered the Orthodox bishop Chrysostomos and a few days later the Great Fire of Smyrna burnt large parts of the city (including most of the Greek and Armenian areas). Estimated Greek and Armenian deaths range from tens of thousands to hundreds of thousands. With the end of the occupation of Smyrna, major combat in Anatolia between Greek and Turkish forces largely ended, and on 24 July 1923, the parties signed the Treaty of Lausanne ending the war.

== Background ==
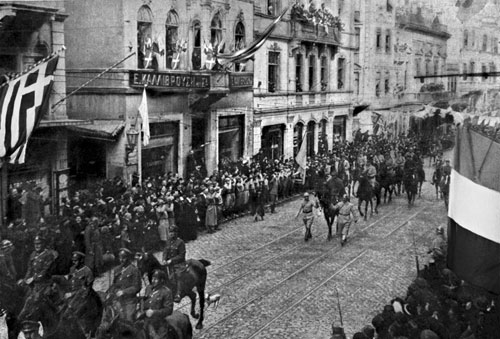
Allied troops marching during the Occupation of Constantinople

Partition of the Ottoman Empire according to the Treaty of Sèvres

At the end of World War I (1914–1918), attention of the Allied Powers (Entente Powers) focused on the partition of the territory of the Ottoman Empire. As part of the Treaty of London (1915), by which Italy left the Triple Alliance (with Germany and Austria-Hungary) and joined France, Great Britain and Russia in the Triple Entente, Italy was promised the Dodecanese and, if the partition of the Ottoman Empire were to occur, land in Anatolia including Antalya and surrounding provinces presumably including Smyrna. But in later 1915, as an inducement to enter the war, British Foreign Secretary Edward Grey in private discussion with Eleftherios Venizelos, the Greek Prime Minister at the time, promised large parts of the Anatolian coast to Greece, including Smyrna. Venizelos resigned from his position shortly after this communication, but when he had formally returned to power in June 1917, Greece entered the war on the side of the Entente.

On 30 October 1918, the Armistice of Mudros was signed between the Entente powers and the Ottoman Empire ending the Ottoman front of World War I. Great Britain, Greece, Italy, France, and the United States began discussing what the treaty provisions regarding the partition of Ottoman territory would be, negotiations which resulted in the Treaty of Sèvres. These negotiations began in February 1919 and each country had distinct negotiating preferences about Smyrna. The French, who had large investments in the region, took a position for territorial integrity of a Turkish state that would include the zone of Smyrna. The British were at a loggerhead over the issue with the War Office and India Office promoting the territorial integrity idea and Prime Minister David Lloyd George and the Foreign Office, headed by Lord Curzon, opposed this suggestion and wanting Smyrna to be under separate administration. The Italian position was that Smyrna was rightfully their possession and so the diplomats would refuse to make any comments when Greek control over the area was discussed. The Greek government, pursuing Venizelos' support for the Megali Idea (to bring areas with a majority Greek population or with historical or religious ties to Greece under control of the Greek state) and supported by Lloyd George, began a large propaganda effort to promote their claim to Smyrna including establishing a mission under the foreign minister in the city. Moreover, the Greek claim over the Smyrna area (which appeared to have a clear Greek majority, although exact percentages varied depending on the source) were supported by Woodrow Wilson's Fourteen Points which emphasized the right to autonomous development for minorities in Anatolia. In negotiations, despite French and Italian objections, by the middle of February 1919 Lloyd George shifted the discussion to how Greek administration would work and not whether Greek administration would happen. To further this aim, he brought in a set of experts, including Arnold J. Toynbee, to discuss how the zone of Smyrna would operate and what its impacts would be on the population. Following this discussion, in late February 1919, Venizelos appointed Aristeidis Stergiadis, a close political ally, the High Commissioner of Smyrna (appointed over political riser Themistoklis Sofoulis).

In April 1919, the Italians landed and took over Antalya and began showing signs of moving troops towards Smyrna. During the negotiations at about the same time, the Italian delegation walked out when it became clear that Fiume (Rijeka) would not be given to them in the peace outcome. Lloyd George saw an opportunity to break the impasse over Smyrna with the absence of the Italian delegation and, according to Jensen, he "concocted a report that an armed uprising of Turkish guerrillas in the Smyrna area was seriously endangering the Greek and other Christian minorities." Both to protect local Christians and also to limit increasing Italian action in Anatolia, French Prime Minister Georges Clemenceau and U.S. President Woodrow Wilson supported a Greek military occupation of Smyrna. Although Smyrna would be occupied by Greek troops, authorized by the Allies, the Allies did not agree that Greece would take sovereignty over the territory until further negotiations settled this issue. The Italian delegation acquiesced to this outcome and the Greek occupation was authorized.

== Greek landing at Smyrna ==
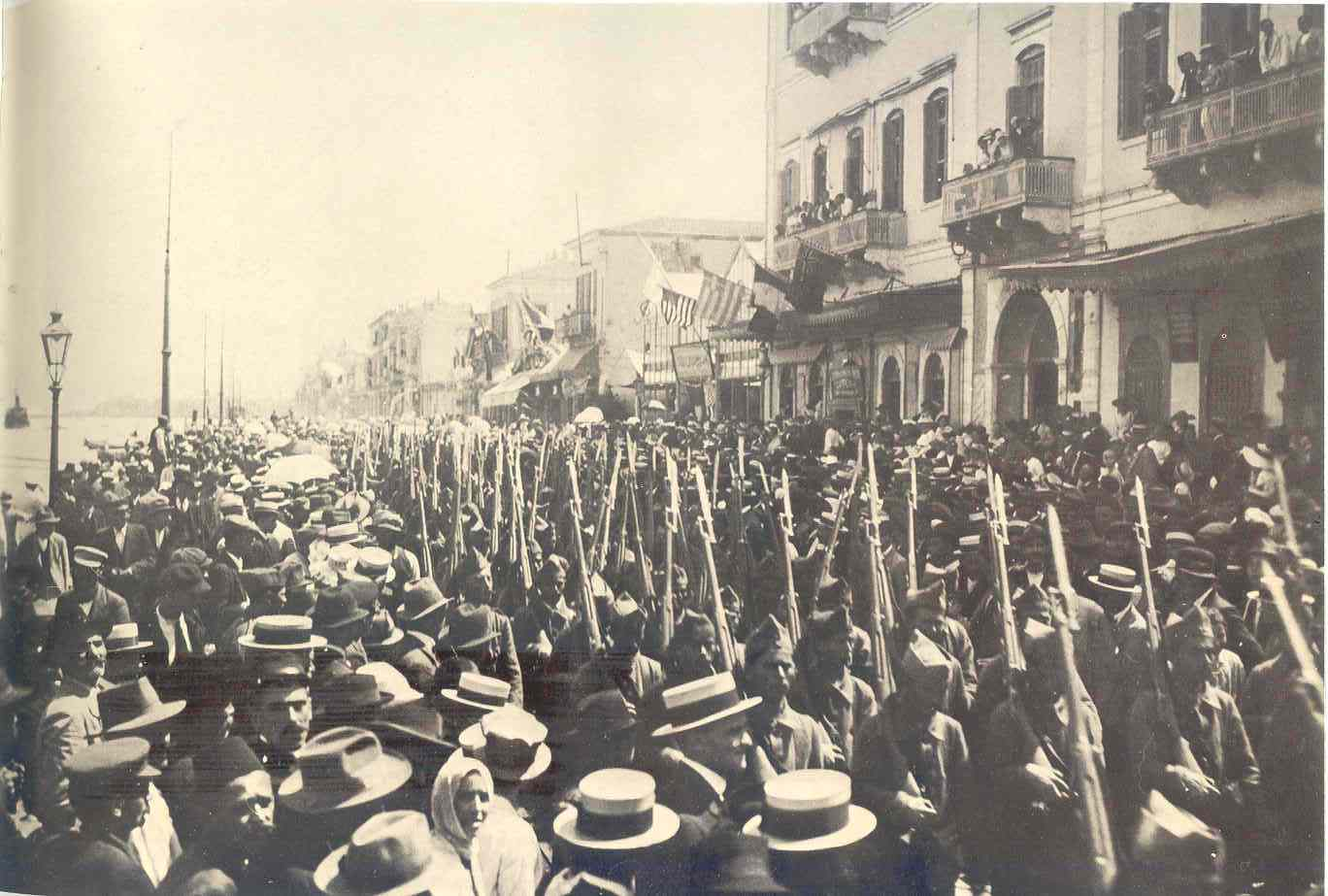
Greek troops marching on İzmir's coastal street, May 1919

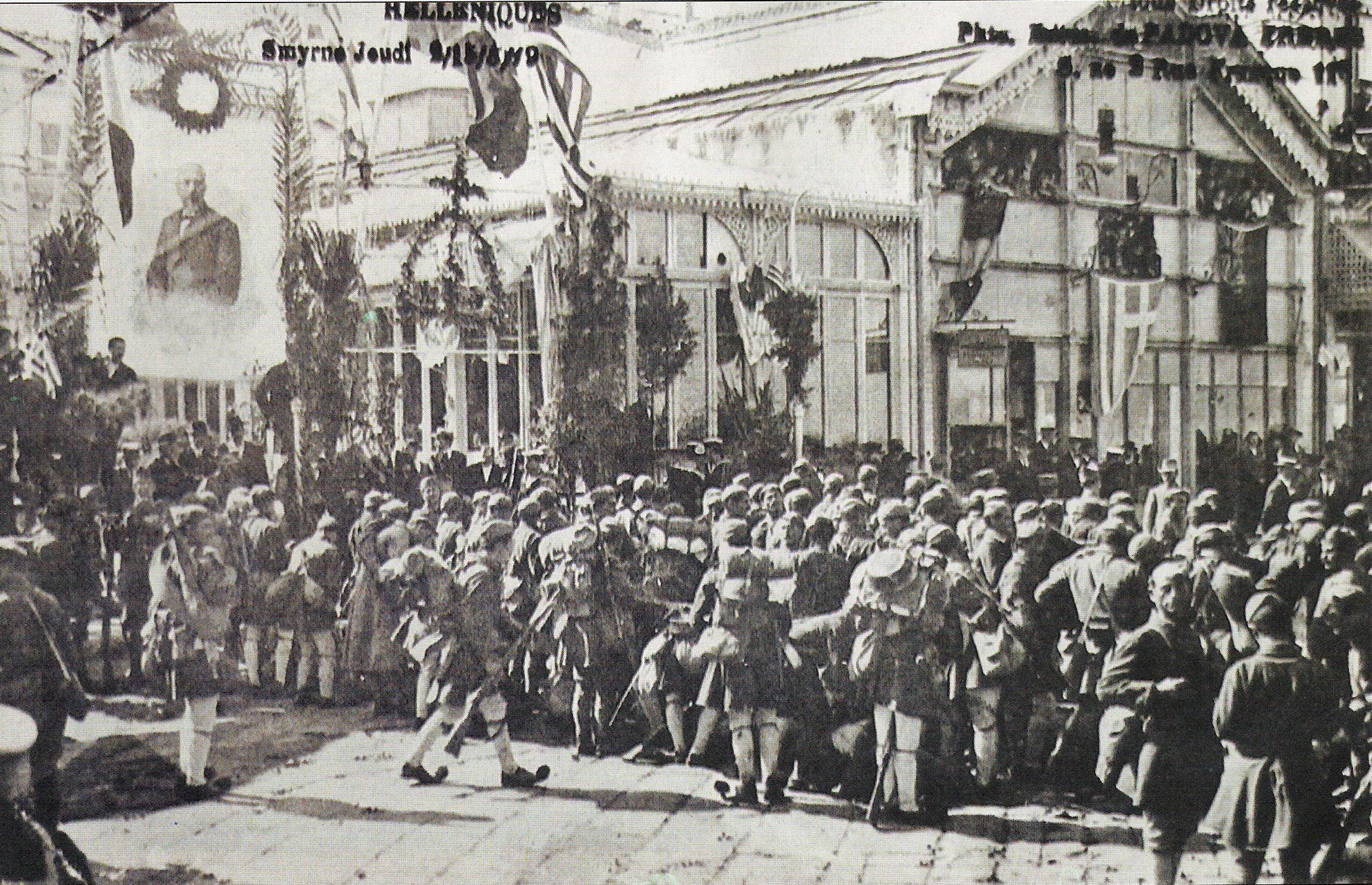
Greek soldiers taking their posts, May 1919

On 14 May 1919, the Greek mission in Smyrna read a statement announcing that Greek troops would be arriving the next day in the city. Smith reports that this news was "received with great emotion" by the Greek population of the city while thousands of Turkish residents gathered in the hill that night lighting fires and beating drums in protest. The same night, thousands of Turkish prisoners were released from a prison with the complicity of the Ottoman and Italian commanders in charge of the prison.

Greek occupation of Smyrna started on 15 May 1919 where a large crowd gathered waving the Greek kingdom flags on the docks where the Greek troops were expected to arrive. The Metropolitan of Smyrna, Chrysostomos, blessed the first troops as they arrived. An inexperienced colonel was in charge of the operation and neither the appointed high commissioner nor high-ranking military individuals were there for the landing, resulting in miscommunication and a breakdown of discipline. Most significantly, this resulted in the 1/38 Evzone Regiment landing north of where they were to take up their post. They had to march south, passing a large part of the Greek celebratory crowds, the Ottoman governor's konak and the barracks of Ottoman troops. Someone other than the Greek soldiers fired a shot (Smith states that no one knows who despite multiple investigations) and chaos resulted, with the Greek troops firing multiple shots into the konak and the barracks. The Ottoman troops surrendered and the Greek regiment began marching them up the coast to a ship to serve as a temporary prison. A British subject at the scene claimed he witnessed the shooting deaths of thirty unarmed prisoners during this march, by both Greeks in the crowd and Greek troops. British officers in the harbor reported seeing Greek troops bayoneting multiple Turkish prisoners during the march and then saw them thrown into the sea. In the chaos, looting of Turkish houses began, and by the end of the day three to four hundred Turks had been killed. One hundred Greeks were also killed, including two soldiers. Violence continued the next day and for the next months as Greek troops took over towns and villages in the region and atrocities were committed by both ethnic groups, notably the Battle of Aydın on 27 June 1919.

=== Reactions to the landing ===
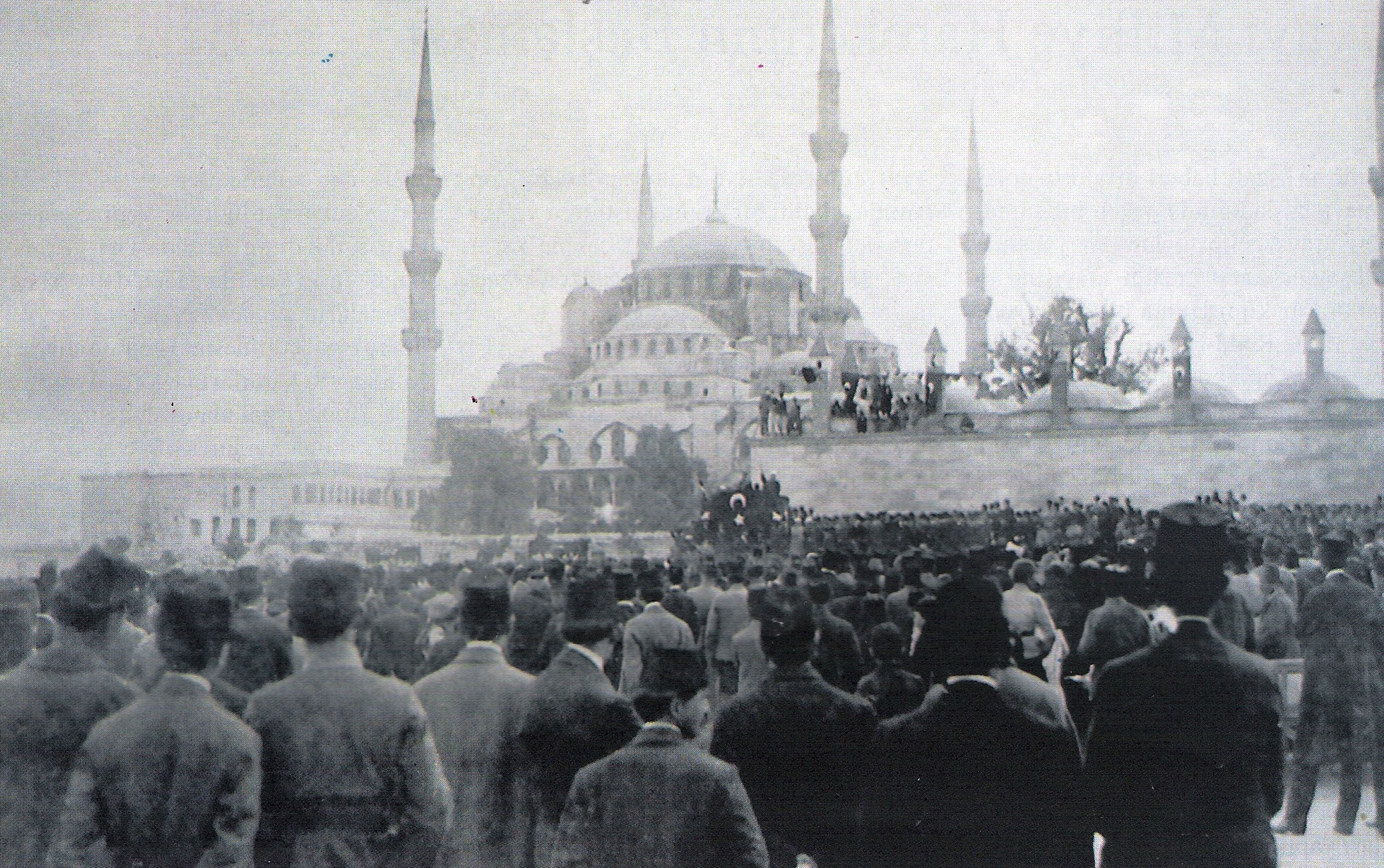
Turks demonstrate in Istanbul for national unity.

The landing and reports of the violence had a large impact on many parties. The landing helped bring together the various groups of Turkish resistance into an organized movement (further assisted by the landing of Mustafa Kemal in Samsun on 19 May 1919). Several demonstrations were held by Turkish people in Constantinople condemning the occupation of Smyrna. Between 100,000 and 150,000 people gathered in a meeting at Sultanahmet square organized by the Karakol society and Türk Ocağı.

==== Inter-Allied Commission of Inquiry ====
As a response to the claims of violence, the French Prime Minister Clemenceau suggested an Interallied Commission of Inquiry to Smyrna: the commission was made up of Admiral Mark Lambert Bristol for the United States, General Bunoust for France, General Hare for England, General Dall'olio for Italy and, as a non-voting observer, Colonel Mazarakis for Greece. It began work in August 1919 and interviewed 175 witnesses and visited multiple sites of alleged atrocities. The decision reached was that when a Greek witness and Turkish witness disagreed, a European witness would be used to provide the conclusions for the report. This system was dismissed by Venizelos because he claimed that the Europeans living in Smyrna benefited from privileges given to them under the Ottoman rule and were thus opposed to Greek rule. The report was released to negotiators in October and generally found Greeks responsible for the bloodshed related to the landing and the violence throughout the Smyrna zone after the landing. In addition, the conclusions questioned the fundamental justification for the Greek occupation and suggested Greek troops be replaced by an allied force.

After the report's release, Venizelos accused the Commission of bias and of condemning Greece without giving them an opportunity to defend themselves. Nevertheless, Venizelos made sure to punish Greek soldiers who were found guilty of atrocities. Court martial on August 15, 1919 led by the Greek High Commissioner for the violence on May 15 and May 16 pronounced 74 convictions (including 48 Greeks, 13 Turks, 12 Armenians and one Jew). The Greek observer, Colonel Alexandros Mazarakis-Ainian, later wrote his own separate report on the massacres, including witnesses who were refused a hearing by the Commission. Eyre Crowe, a main British diplomat, dismissed the larger conclusion by saying the commission had overstepped its mandate.

Greek claims of bias have been mostly corroborated by modern research. The report's conclusions are, indeed, considered unreliable firstly because the commission was headed by pro-Turkish rear admiral Mark L. Bristol, who "had already reached his conclusion months before the investigation", and secondly because "the Turks went to great lengths to document Greek atrocities and sanitize reports of their own". There is also evidence that Bristol's intelligence officer, Robert Steed Dunn, had skewed the report against Greece. Harry Dwight Chamberlin found Dunn untrustworthy and Robert Woods Bliss sent a telegram to Warren Delano Robbins for Dunn to be sent away for this reason. Robbins proceeded to fire Dunn in 1922. It was later assessed by historian Peter M. Buzanski that Dunn's reports were "the result more of barroom gossip than of serious intelligence gathering".

In addition, according to historians Benny Morris and Dror Ze'evi: "[t]he commission made no mention of some 3,000 Aydın Greeks—men, women, and children—who were murdered, nor of 800 women and children deported inland" during the Battle of Aydın. In the city, irregular Turks had "torched the Greek quarter and massacred the remaining inhabitants". They note:

The Turks also accused the Greek army of levelling Aydın town and massacring civilians there. But the story was more complicated. When Turkish irregulars retook the town in July, armed locals joined in, firing from rooftops and windows at the retreating Greeks. In retaliation, they set fire to the Turkish quarter. The Turks then torched the Greek quarter and massacred the remaining inhabitants. Even Toynbee refused to sugarcoat what the Turks did to Greek noncombatants: “Women and children were hunted like rats from house to house, and civilians [...] were slaughtered in batches—shot or knifed or hurled over a cliff. [...] Many of the women... were violated.”

George William Rendel, a contemporary to the events, reported on the massacres of the Turks against the Greeks:

The greater part of its [Aydın's] inhabitants were killed, some being shot, others pierced with red hot irons, others cut to pieces and others put to death with the cruelest tortures. The inhabitants’ property was plundered, virgins were carried off to the mountains, and Aydin is a vast cemetery. After the destruction of Aydin 800 women and children were sent off by railway to Nazli and Denizli on June 18th and 19th 1919.

Historian Heinz A. Richter also agrees with the above assessments, stating that the Commission's report exaggerated reports of Greek excesses and showed biased anti-Greek tendencies.

==== Aftermath of the landing ====
In the negotiations after the report, Clemenceau stated to Venizelos that the occupation of Smyrna was not permanent and merely a political solution. The British representative rejected Clemenceau's claims and Venizelos protested, writing that he had not been informed about the occupation being non-permanent beforehand. The Brits reassured Venizelos, ending the disagreement.

At about the same time, British Field Marshal George Milne was tasked by the allies with devising a solution to Italian and Greek tension in the Menderes River Valley. Milne warned in his report that Turkish guerrilla action would continue as long as the Greeks continued to occupy Smyrna and questioned the justification for Greek occupation. Most importantly, his report developed a border that would separate the Smyrna zone from the rest of Anatolia. The council of Great Britain, France, U.S. and Italy approved the Milne line beyond which Greek troops were not to cross, except to pursue attackers but not more than 3 km beyond the line.

== Administration of the Smyrna Zone (1919–1922) ==
After the initial panic and for the next three years, the Greek zone of occupation was relatively tranquil. According to contemporaries, Smyrna, under the newly appointed Greek high commissioner Aristeidis Stergiadis was very well-governed and was "making a great and honest effort to see justice done to Turks". In addition, the conduct of Greek gendarmes in the region was praised.

According to Morris and Ze'evi: "The Greek administrators did their best to maintain law, order, and justice, shunning a policy of expulsion, as might have been expected from a vengeful occupier".

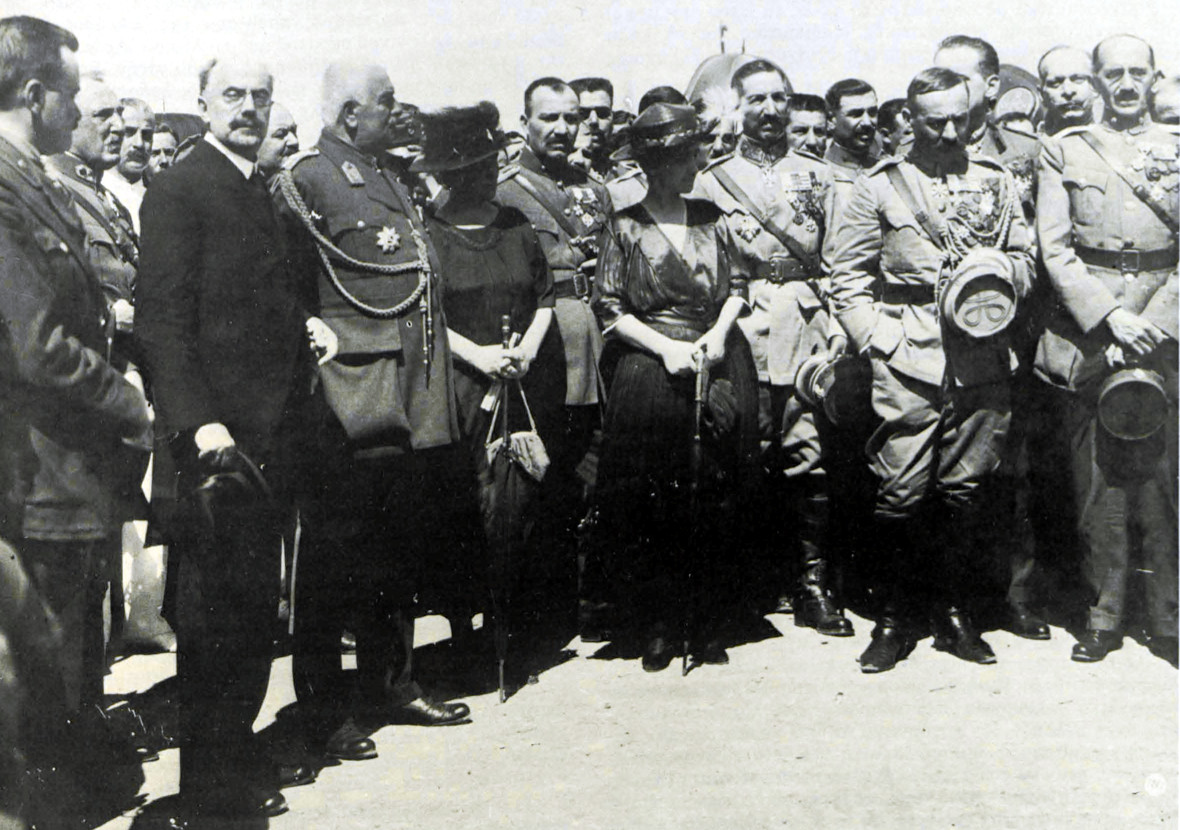
The Greek leadership in October 1920: High Commissioner Aristeidis Stergiadis, Lt. Gen. Leonidas Paraskevopoulos and his chief of staff, Maj. Gen. Theodoros Pangalos

=== High commissioner ===
Aristeidis Stergiadis was appointed the high commissioner of Smyrna in February and arrived in the city four days after the 15 May landing. Stergiadis immediately went to work in setting up an administration, easing ethnic violence, and making way for permanent annexation of Smyrna. Stergiadis immediately punished the Greek soldiers responsible for violence on 15–16 May with court martial and created a commission to decide on payment for victims (made up of representatives from Great Britain, France, Italy and other allies). Stergiadis took a strict stance against discrimination of the Turkish population and opposed church leaders and the local Greek population on a number of occasions. Historians disagree about whether this was a genuine stance against discrimination or whether it was an attempt to present a positive vision of the occupation to the allies.

This stance against discrimination of the Turkish population often pitted Stergiadis against the local Greek population, the church and the army. He reportedly would carry a stick through the town with which he would beat Greeks that were being abusive of Turkish citizens. At one point, Stergiadis interrupted and ended a sermon by the bishop Chrysostomos that he believed to be incendiary. Troops would disobey his orders to not abuse the Turkish population often putting him in conflict with the military. On 14 July 1919, the acting foreign secretary sent a long critical telegraph to Venizelos suggesting that Stergiadis be removed and writing that "His sick neuroticism has reached a climax." Venizelos continued to support Stergiadis despite this opposition, while the latter oversaw a number of projects planning for a permanent Greek administration of Smyrna.

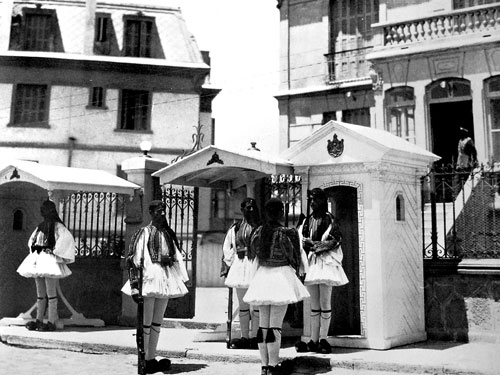
Evzones in front of the headquarters of the High Commissioner

=== Structure of the administration ===
The Greek consulate building became the center of government. Since Ottoman sovereignty was not replaced with the occupation, their administrative structure continued to exist but Stergiadis simply replaced senior positions with Greeks (except for the post for Muslim Affairs) while Turkish functionaries remained in low positions. Urgent steps were required for the organization of a local administration as soon as the Greek army secured control of the region. A significant obstacle during the first period of the Greek administration was the absence of a clear definition of the Greek mandate. In this context the coexistence of interallied authorities whose functions often overlapped with that of the Greek authorities resulted in a series of misunderstandings and friction between the two sides. This situation resulted after a decision by the Supreme Allied Council that all movements of the Greek army had to be approved by Field Marshal George Milne.

The administration of the Smyrna zone was organized in units largely based on the former Ottoman system. Apart from the kaza of Smyrna and the adjacent area of Ayasoluk which were under the direct control of the Smyrna High Commission, the remaining zone was divided into one province (Greek: Νομαρχία Nomarchia): that of Manisa, as well as the following counties (Greek: Υποδιοικήσεις Ypodioikiseis): Ödemiş, Tire (Thira), Bayındır (Vaindirion), Nympheon, Krini, Karaburna, Sivrihisar, Vryula, Palea Phocaea, Menemen, Kasaba, Bergama and Ayvali.

=== Repatriation of refugees ===
The repatriation of the Asia Minor Greeks who had sought refuge in the Greek Kingdom as a result of the deportations and persecutions by the Ottoman authorities, assumed top priority, already from May 1919. The Greek authorities wanted to avoid a situation where refugees would return without the necessary supervision and planning. For this purpose, a special department was created within the High Commission.

A survey conducted by the refugees department indicated that more than 150 towns and villages along the coastal area (from Edremit to Söke) had been destroyed during World War I. Especially from the 45,000 households belonging to local Greeks, 18,000 were partially damaged, while 23,000 completely destroyed.

In general the period of the Greek administration experienced a continuous movement of refugee populations aided by charitable institutions such as the Red Cross and the Greek "Patriotic Institution" (Greek: Πατριωτικό Ίδρυμα). In total, 100,000 Greeks who had lost their land during World War I, many a result of Ottoman discrimination, were resettled under Stergiadis, given generous credit, and access to farm tools.

This resettlement of Greeks and strict measures by the army led "great numbers of Muslims to leave the Greek zone", which created a refugee problem. In addition, contrary to Stergiadis' and Venizelos' orders, there was some discrimination by junior Greek administrators and military members, which further contributed to Turkish hostility in the Smyrna zone.

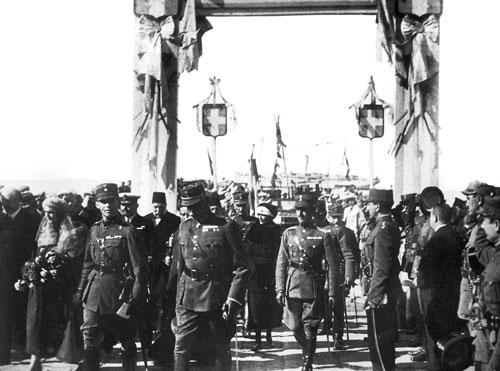
Arrival of Crown Prince George, 1921

=== Muslim affairs ===
Following the Treaty of Sèvres, all sections of the Ottoman administration that dealt with issues pertaining to Muslim religion, education and family affairs were organized by the High Commission. Under this context a special polytechnic school was established in Smyrna which soon operated with 210 Muslim students and with costs covered by the Greek administration.

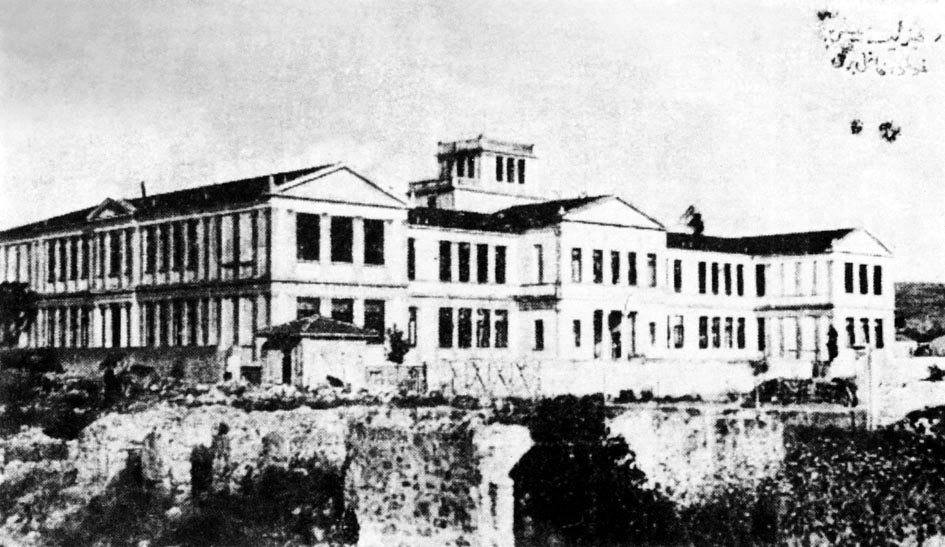
The Ionian University of Smyrna was established in December 1920 and organized by Constantin Carathéodory.

=== Archaeological excavations ===
Archaeological missions in Asia Minor were of significant importance for the High Commission. Excavations were focused on ancient Greek settlements in the area, mainly found in the surroundings of the urban areas, as well as along the coastal zone. The most important excavations were conducted during 1921–1922, when important findings were unearthed in the Ionian sites of Klazomenai, Ephesus and Nysa. Apart from ancient Greek antiquities, Byzantine monuments were also unearthed, such as the 6th century Basilica of St. John the Theologian in Ephesus. In general, the excavations undertaken by the Greek administration provided interesting material concerning the history of Ancient Greek and Byzantine Art.

=== University ===
Another important project undertaken during the Greek administration was the institution and organization of the Ionian University of Smyrna. Originally conceived by the Greek Prime Minister Eleftherios Venizelos and entrusted to Professor German-Greek mathematician Constantin Carathéodory of Göttingen University, as head of the new university. In the summer of 1922, its facilities were completed at a cost of 110,000 Turkish liras. The latter included 70 lecture rooms, a large amphitheatre, a number of laboratories and separate smaller structures for the university personnel. Its various schools and departments of the university were to start operating gradually. Moreover, a microbiology laboratory, the local Pasteur institute and the department of health became the first fields of instruction at the new university.

== Developments in the Greco-Turkish War ==
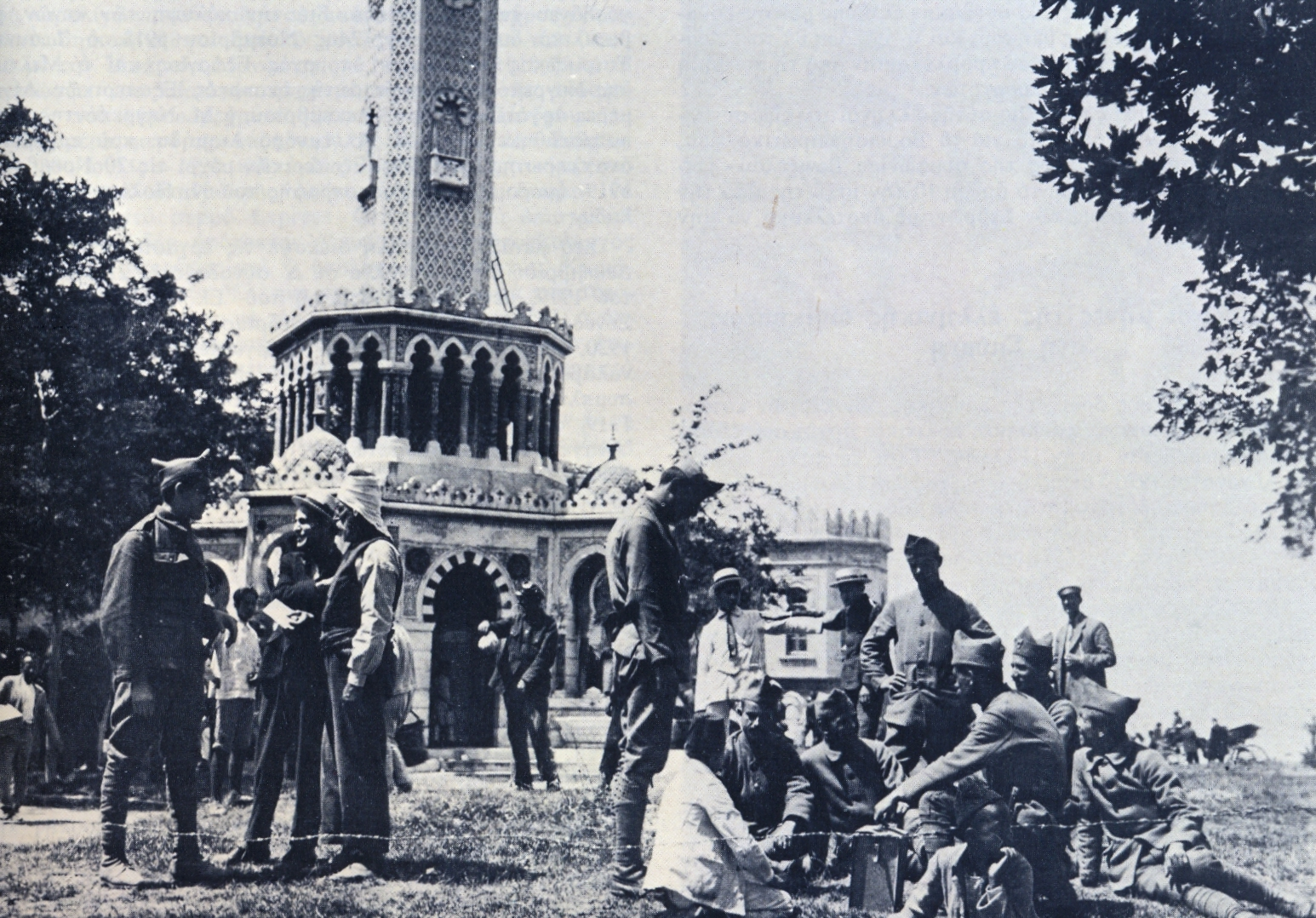
Greek soldiers and civilians at the Smyrna clock tower, summer 1920

In 1920, the Smyrna zone became a key base for the Greek summer offensive in the Greco-Turkish War. Early in July 1920, the allies approved operations by the Greeks to take over Eastern Thrace and territory around Smyrna as part of ongoing hostilities with the Turkish Nationalist movement. On 22 July 1920, Greek military divisions crossed the Milne line around the Smyrna zone and began military operations in the rest of Anatolia.

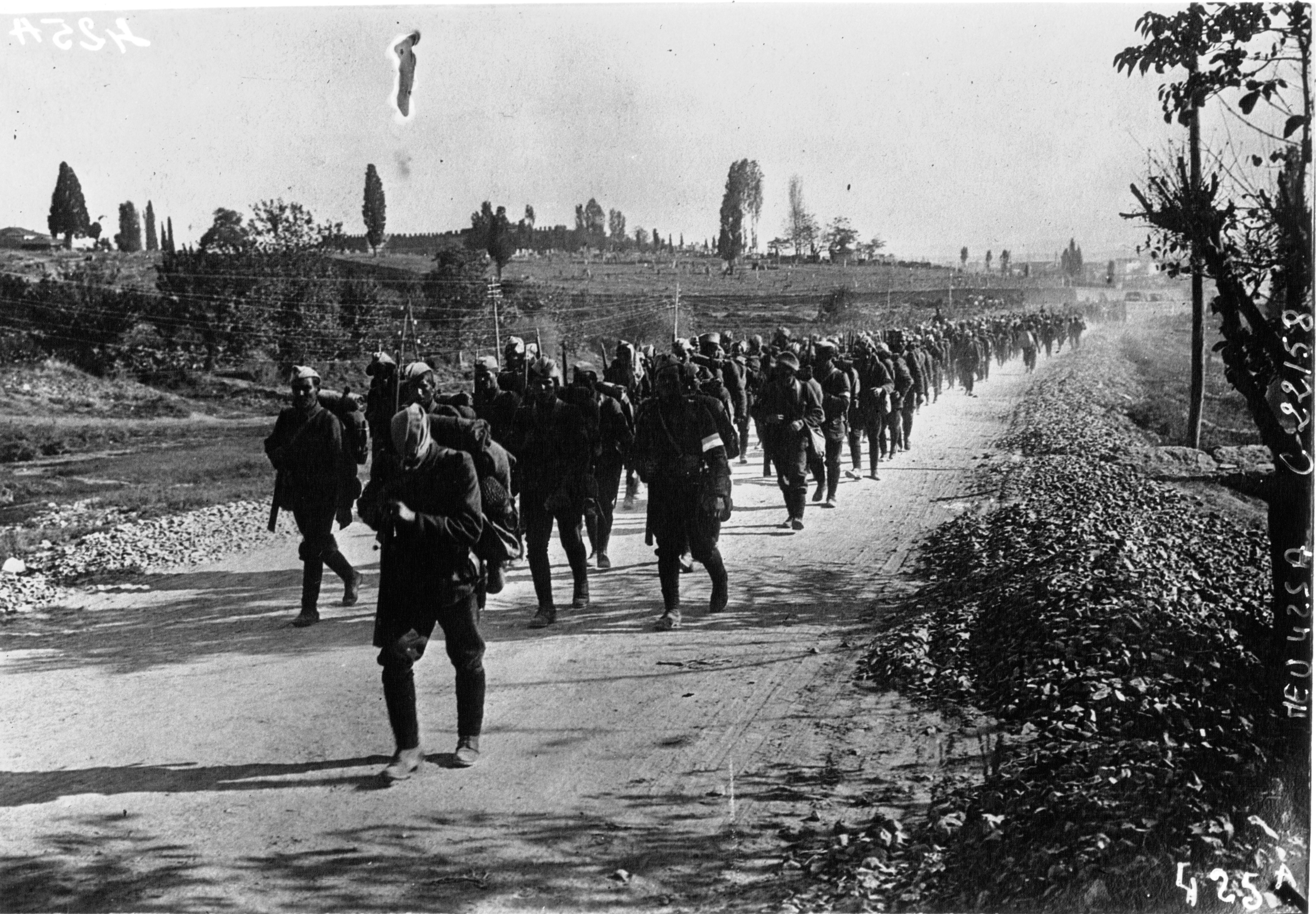
Greek soldiers retreating, 1922

International negotiations between the allies and the Ottoman administration largely ignored the increasing conflict. In early 1920, Lloyd George was able to convince the new French Prime Minister, Alexandre Millerand to accept Greek control of Smyrna, but under Turkish suzerainty. Negotiations were further refined in April 1920 at a meeting of the parties in Sanremo which was designed to discuss mostly issues of Germany, but because of increasing power of the nationalist forces under Kemal, the discussion shifted to focus on Smyrna. French pressure and divisions within the British government resulted in Lloyd George accepting a time frame of 5 years for Greek control over Smyrna with the issue to be decided by the League of Nations at that point. These decisions, i.e. regarding a Greek administration but with limited Turkish sovereignty and a 5-year limit, were included in the text of the Treaty of Sèvres agreed to on 10 August 1920. Because the treaty largely ignored the rise of nationalist forces and the ethnic tension in the Smyrna zone, Montgomery has described the Treaty of Sèvres as "stillborn". However, with the signing of the Treaty of Sèvres, the Ottoman Vali Izzet Bey handed over authority over Smyrna to Stergiadis.

In October 1920, Venizelos lost his position as Prime Minister of Greece. French and Italians used this opportunity to remove their support and financial obligations to the Smyrna occupation and this left the British as the only force supporting the Greek occupation. Smyrna remained a key base of operations for the ongoing war through the rest of 1920 and 1921, particularly under General Georgios Hatzianestis.

A significant loss at the Battle of Sakarya in September 1921 resulted in a retreat of Greek forces to the 1920 lines. The ensuing retreat resulted in massive civilian casualties and atrocities committed by Greek and Turkish troops. Jensen summarizes the violence writing that "The Turkish population was subjected to horrible atrocities by the retreating troops and accompanying civilian Christian mobs. The pursuing Turkish cavalry did not hesitate in kind on the Christian populace; the road from Uşak to Smyrna lay littered with corpses."

== Aftermath ==
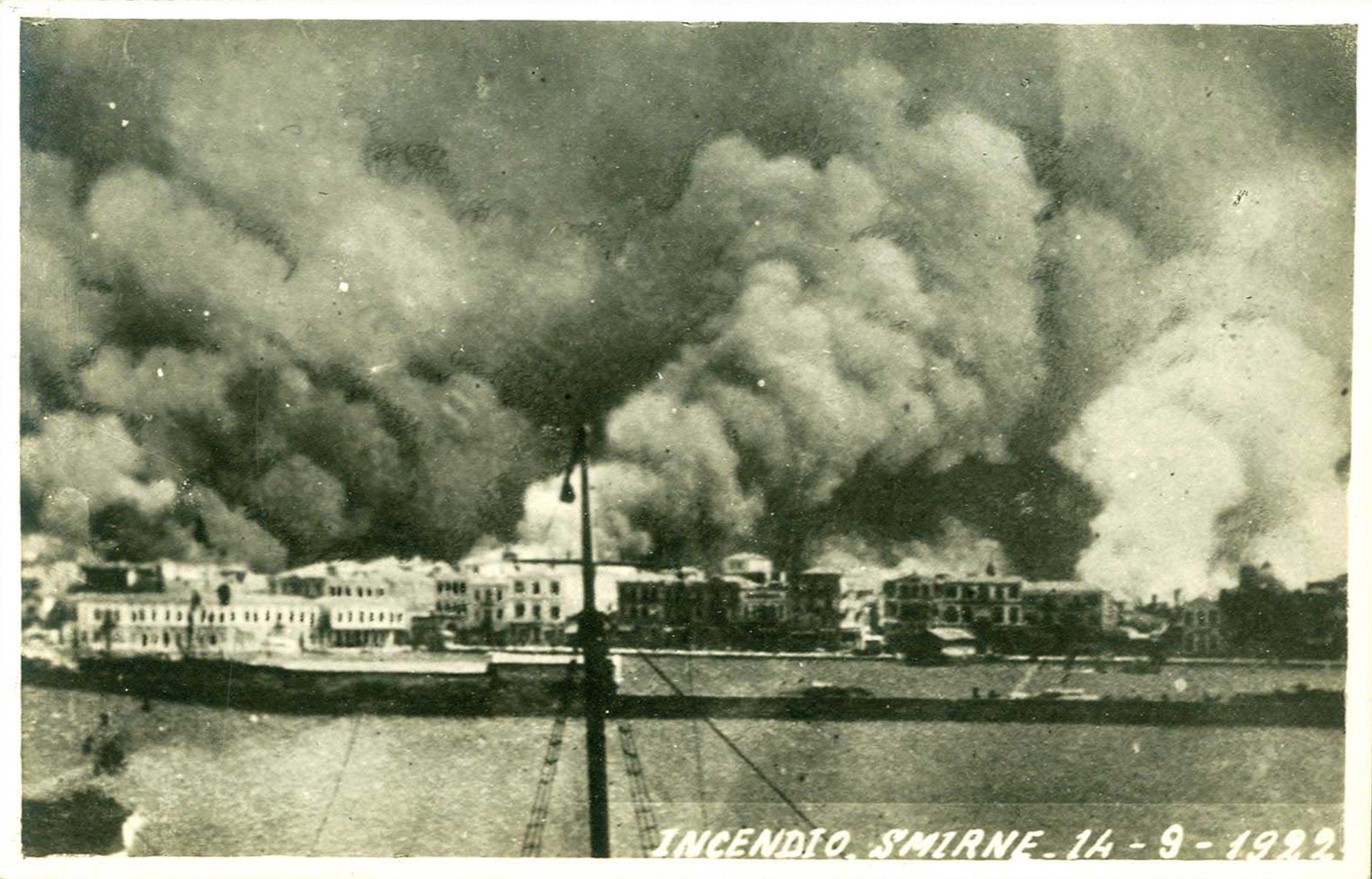
Photo of the Great fire of Smyrna (1922)

Greek troops evacuated Smyrna on 9 September 1922 and a small allied force of British entered the city to prevent looting and violence. The next day, Mustafa Kemal, leading a number of troops, entered the city and was greeted by enthusiastic Turkish crowds. Atrocities by Turkish troops and irregulars against the Greek and Armenian population occurred immediately after the takeover. Most notably, Chrysostomos, the Orthodox Bishop, was lynched by a mob of Turkish citizens. A few days afterward, a fire destroyed the Greek and Armenian quarters of the city, while the Turkish and Jewish quarters remained undamaged. On the Turkish side, the events are known as the Liberation of İzmir, while on the Greek side, they are known as the Catastrophe of Smyrna.

The evacuation of Smyrna by Greek troops ended most of the large scale fighting in the Greco-Turkish war which was formally ended with an Armistice and a final treaty on 24 July 1923 with the Treaty of Lausanne. Much of the Greek population was included in the 1923 population exchange between Greece and Turkey resulting in migration to Greece and elsewhere.

== See also ==
- Outline and timeline of the Greek genocide

== Sources ==
- Solomonidis, Victoria (1984). "Greece in Asia Minor: The Greek Administration in the Vilayet of Aydin" (PDF). University of London, King's College.
