= USS Bristol (DD-857) =

Allen M. Sumner-class destroyer

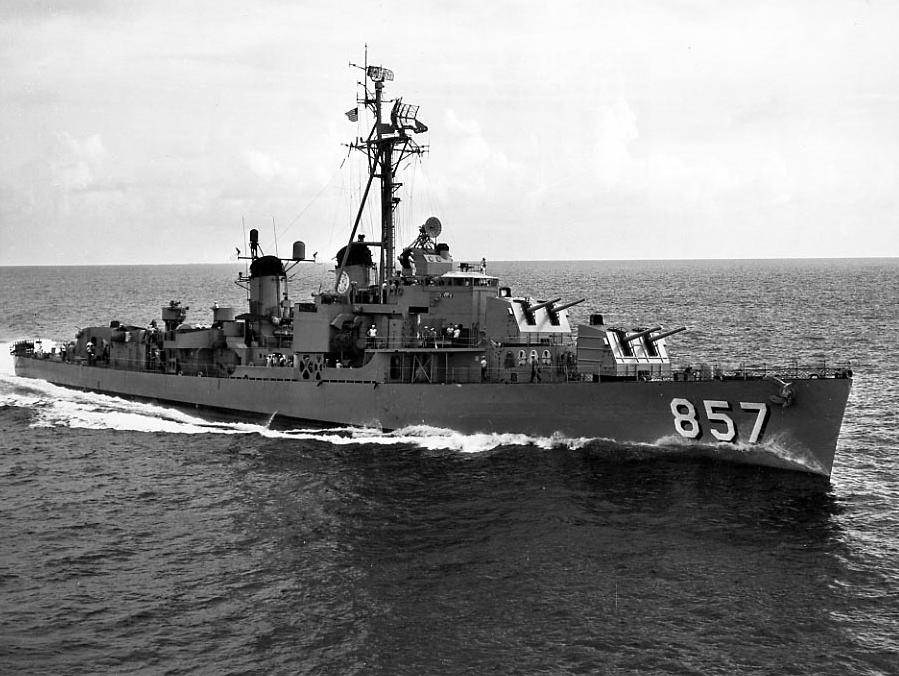
- USS Bristol underway in August 1959

History

United States
- Name: Bristol
- Namesake: Mark Lambert Bristol
- Builder: Bethlehem Shipbuilding
- Laid down: 5 May 1944
- Launched: 29 October 1944
- Sponsored by: Mrs. August Frederick Eberly
- Commissioned: 17 March 1945
- Decommissioned: 21 November 1969
- Stricken: 21 November 1969
- Identification: Callsign: NBEZ; Hull number: DD-857
- Motto: Ship Shape & Bristol Fashion
- Honours and awards: See Awards
- Fate: Transferred to Taiwan, 9 December 1969
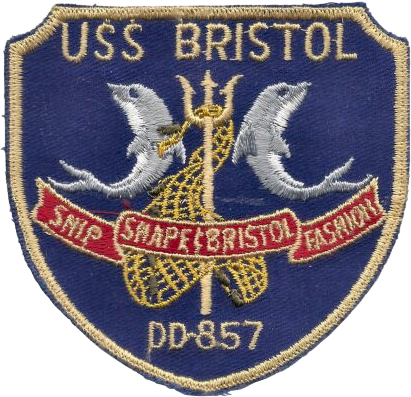
- Badge

Taiwan
- Name: Hua Yang; (華陽)
- Namesake: Hua Yang
- Acquired: 9 December 1969
- Commissioned: 9 December 1969
- Identification: Hull number: DD-3
- Reclassified: DD-988, 1 January 1976; DDG-903, 1 October 1979
- Decommissioned: 25 April 1994
- Stricken: 1994
- Fate: Scrapped

General characteristics
- Class & type: Allen M. Sumner-class destroyer
- Displacement: 2,200 tons
- Length: 376 ft 6 in (114.76 m)
- Beam: 40 ft (12 m)
- Draft: 15 ft 8 in (4.78 m)
- Propulsion: 60,000 shp (45,000 kW); 2 propellers
- Speed: 34 knots (63 km/h; 39 mph)
- Range: 6,500 nmi (12,000 km; 7,500 mi) at 15 kn (28 km/h; 17 mph)
- Complement: 336
- Armament: 6 × 5 in (127 mm)/38 cal. guns; 12 × 40 mm guns; 8 × 20 mm cannons; 10 × 21 inch (533 mm) torpedo tubes; 2 × depth charge tracks; 4 × depth charge projectors

USS Bristol (DD-857), an Allen M. Sumner-class destroyer, was the second ship of the United States Navy to be named for Rear Admiral Mark Lambert Bristol, who served as Commander-in-Chief North Atlantic Fleet from 1901 to 1903.

== Construction and career ==
The second Bristol was launched on 29 October 1944 by Bethlehem Shipbuilding, San Pedro, California, sponsored by Mrs. August Frederick Eberly; and commissioned on 17 March 1945.

=== Service in the United States Navy ===
Bristol departed San Diego on 13 June 1945, en route to Pearl Harbor, arriving on 19 June 1945. Arriving at Guam on 29 July she joined Task Group 30.8, a logistic support group supplying Task Force 38. On 5 August 1945, Bristol collided with Ashtabula. Bristol's bow was damaged and she returned to Guam for repairs. Repairs were completed on 1 September, after which she departed for Far Eastern occupation duty. Her tour of duty ended on 21 February 1946, and she returned to San Pedro on 15 March.

In April 1946, Bristol proceeded to the east coast and reported to the Atlantic Fleet. She operated along the east coast until February 1947, when she steamed to England for a cruise in European waters that lasted until August. Between August 1947 and September 1948, she conducted local operations in the Atlantic and, from September 1948 until January 1949, made a second tour of Europe.

Upon return, she was designated as a Reserve training ship and operated for the next 18 months out of New Orleans, Louisiana. During the summer and fall of 1950, Bristol visited several Caribbean ports, with interim periods of training at Guantanamo Bay, Cuba.

Bristol's homeport was changed to Newport, Rhode Island on 21 October 1950, and, after refresher training at Guantanamo Bay, she reported to Newport for general duty. On 5 March 1951, Bristol proceeded to the Mediterranean for duty with the 6th Fleet, returning to Newport during the summer.

On 2 October 1951, she commenced a round-the-world cruise which took her first to Korea where she served from 31 October 1951 to 27 February 1952. She then returned to Newport via the Suez Canal and the Mediterranean, arriving 21 April 1952.

On 21 November 1969, the ship was decommissioned and stricken. She was later loaned to Republic of China on 9 December 1969.

=== Service in the Republic of China Navy ===
She was commissioned by the Navy on 9 December 1969 and renamed ROCS Hua Yang (DD-3).

The ship was later modified with a triple Hsiung Feng I launcher and associated RTN 10X radar to become a missile destroyer; on New Year's Day in 1976, the hull number was changed to DD-988.

On 1 October 1979, the hull number was changed to DDG-903.

On 7 February 1991, Hua Yang, another Sumner-class destroyer, and 8 missile boats took part in a naval exercise off of Kaohsiung. The unit conducted joint sea-air anti-submarine, joint sea-land air defense, anti-missile boat, and underway replenishment exercises.

She was decommissioned on 25 April 1994 and sold for scrap.

== Awards ==
Bristol received one battle star for her World War II service and two battle stars for her Korean service.
