= Greek landing at Smyrna =

Military engagement

- Part of the Greco-Turkish War (1919–22) and the campaign of the Turkish War of Independence
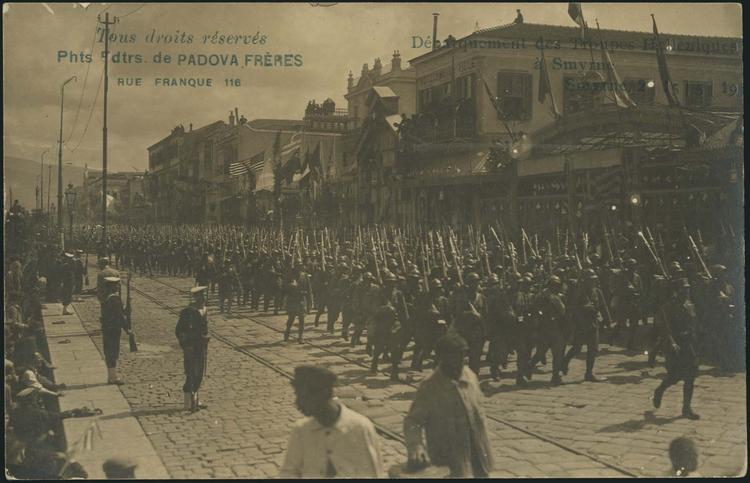
- A postcard depicting a parade of Greek soldiers landing in Smyrna. "Débarquement des Troupes Helléniques à Smyrne - 15 Mai 1919" ("Landing of Greek Troops in Smyrna - May 15, 1919")
Date	May 15, 1919
Location	Aidin Vilayet, Ottoman Empire 38.4186°N 27.1392°E
Result	Greek victory: occupation of Smyrna: Greco-Turkish War (1919–1922) begins; Greek army extends to capture Aydın, Menemen, Pergamos, Kydonies, and Çeşme

Belligerents
(Kingdom of Greece) Greece; Naval support: United Kingdom; France; United States	Ottoman Empire

Commanders and leaders
Colonel Nikolaos Zafeiriou¹; Lt. Colonel Dionysios Stavrianopoulos²; Cpt. Elias Mavroudis³; Lt. Colonel Haralambos Tseroulis⁴; Lt. Colonel Alexandros Schinas⁵; Lt. Colonel Konstantinos Tsakalos^{6}	Nureddin Pasha^{7} Ali Nadir Pasha^{8} Hürrem Bey^{9} Ali Bey^{10} Kâzım Bey^{11}

Strength
Up to 15,000 soldiers	3,000 soldiers

Casualties and losses
2 killed 6–20 wounded	30–40 killed (killed in captivity or during surrender); 40–60 wounded
- 20 Greek civilians killed, 20 drowned, 60 wounded 300–675 Turkish civilians killed or wounded
- 1: Commander of the Greek 1st Division, 2: Commander of the 1/38 National Guard Command, 3: Captain of the Leon Destroyer, 4: Commander of the Division Regiment, 5: Commander of the 4th Infantry Regiment, 6: Commander of the 5th Infantry Regiment, 7: Commander of the Ottoman XVII Corps, 8: Commander of the Ottoman 56th Division, 9: Commander of the 172nd Infantry Regiment (Ayvalık), 10: Commander of the 173rd Infantry Regiment (Urla)

The Greek landing at Smyrna (Greek: Ελληνική απόβαση στη Σμύρνη; Turkish: Yunanların İzmir'e çıkışı), also known as the Liberation of Smyrna, was a military operation by Greek forces starting on May 15, 1919 which involved landing troops in the city of Smyrna and surrounding areas.

The landing was sanctioned by British Prime Minister David Lloyd George, who argued that: "[a] massacre is taking place over there and there is nobody to protect the Greek population". The Allied powers oversaw the planning of the operation and assisted by directing their forces to take over some key locations and moving warships to the Smyrna harbor. During the landing, a shot was fired on the Greek 1/38 Evzone Regiment and significant violence ensued between both communities, however it was unsystematic and the Greek command tried to thwart it. The event became important for creating the three-year-long Greek Occupation of Smyrna and was a major spark for the Greco-Turkish War (1919–1922).

== Prelude ==
At the end of World War I (1914–1918) and with the Armistice of Mudros that ended the Ottoman front of World War I, the allies began a series of peace talks focused on the Partitioning of the Ottoman Empire. During Paris Peace Conference, 1919 the Italians landed and took over Antalya and began showing signs of moving troops towards Smyrna. When the Italians left the meeting in protest over other issues, British Prime Minister David Lloyd George and Greek Prime Minister Eleftherios Venizelos pushed a concocted report in the peace negotiations alleging that the Christian populations were under direct threat to convince France and the U.S. to support a Greek takeover of the Aidin Vilayet centered in Smyrna. Borders and terms of the Greek occupation were not decided but in early May 1919, the Allied powers supported Greek troops landing in Smyrna and moved a number of battleships into the area to prepare for the landing.

While negotiations were still in progress, Venizelos informed Clemenceau of the deterioration of the situation in Aidin Vilayet, where the local governor, Nureddin Pasha, was ordering Muslim groups to commit excesses against the Greek population. The British intelligence was also informed of the deterioration of law and order in the area and the Italian role in provoking this situation. In early May, Venizelos reported instances of Italian–Turkish cooperation to the Supreme Allied Council and requested that Allied vessels should be sent to Smyrna. This request, although initially accepted by the council, was not carried out immediately. Under this context, the British Prime Minister and the Foreign Office were the main supporters of the Greek landing, with the purpose "to restore public order and forestall the massacres".

=== Turkish reactions ===
The Society for the Defense of Ottoman Rights in Smyrna (İzmir Müdafaa-i Hukuk-ı Osmaniye Cemiyeti) was organized to prepare for the arrival of Greek troops. Nur-ud Din Pasha was appointed governor of the Aidin Vilayet and Aidin Area Command (Aydın Bölge Komutanlığı), and supported activities of the Society for the Defense of Ottoman Rights in İzmir. But he resigned under pressure of the Allied Powers. "Kambur" Kurd Ahmed Izzet Pasha was appointed as new governor on March 11, and retired general Ali Nadir Pasha was appointed to the post of military commander on March 22, 1919.

=== Allied fleet ===
In the early weeks of May 1919, Allied warships entered the area to prepare for the operation. British Admiral Somerset Gough-Calthorpe was the primary commander for the operation involving British, U.S., French, Italian, and Greek forces. On May 11, 1919, Rear Admiral Mark L. Bristol, the Commander of US Naval Detachment in Turkish Waters), came to İzmir from Istanbul on a battleship. The British forces later occupied Karaburun and Uzunada, French forces occupied Urla and Foça, Greek forces occupied Yenikale fortress.

== The Greek landing ==
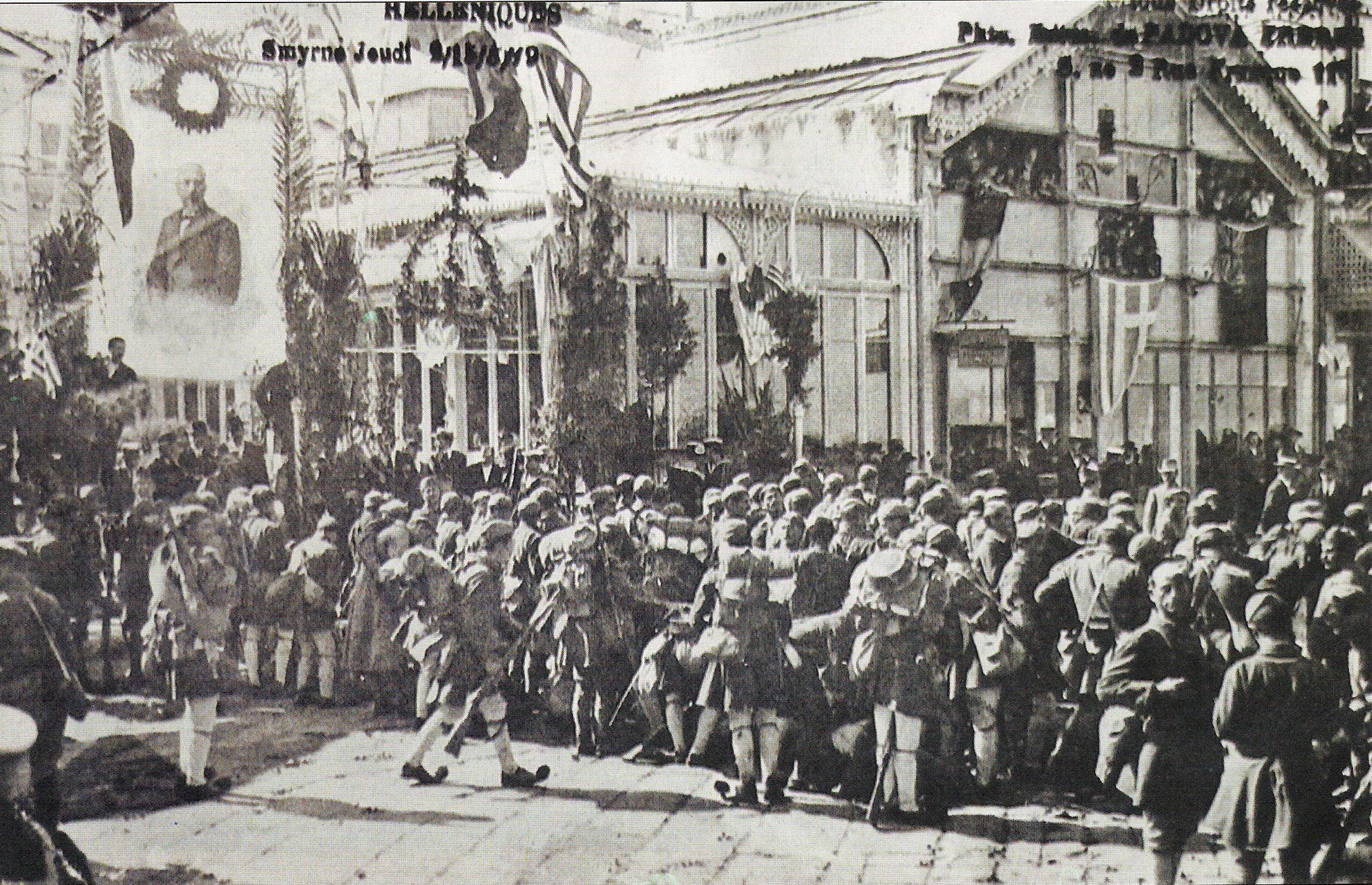
Men of the 1/38 Evzone Regiment at the Smyrna quay

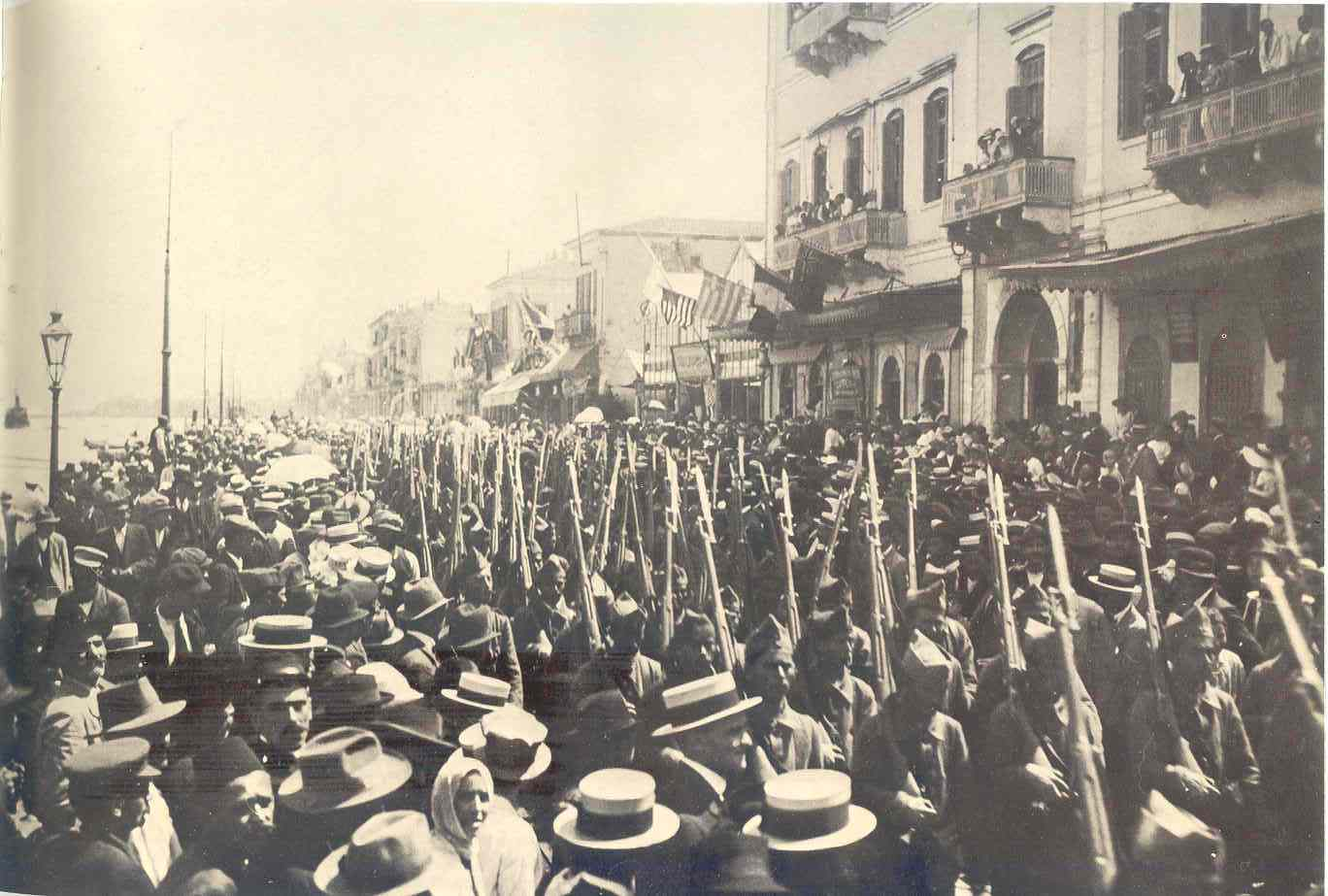
Greek troops marching on İzmir's coastal street, May 1919

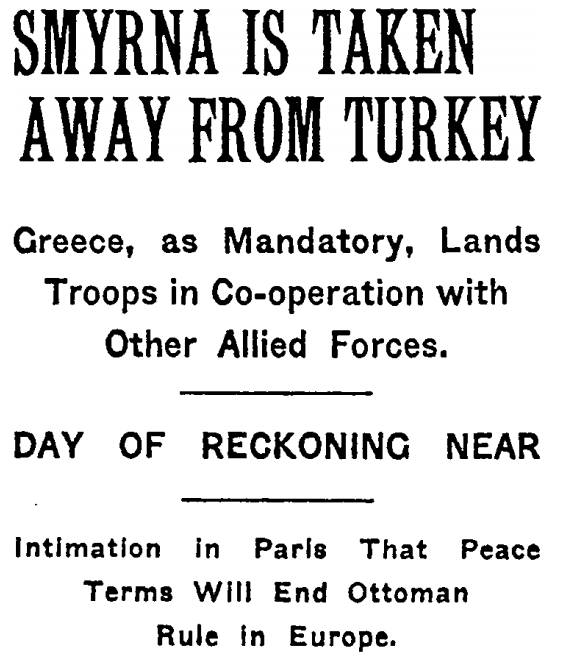
Article from The New York Times, May 17, 1919

On the afternoon of May 11, 1919, the Commander of the 1st Infantry Division of the Hellenic Army, positioned in Kavala, Colonel Nikolaos Zafeiriou, received orders for the operation. The next morning, the landing force, consisting of 13,000 soldiers, as well as auxiliary personnel, 14 transport ships and escorted by 3 British and 4 Greek destroyers, headed to Smyrna. Zafeiriou's order to his soldiers, who learned about their destination only after the departure, was the following:

Wherever we may go, we must know that we are going to liberate our brethren under alien rule. The enthusiasm filling our hearts is fully justified but any improper manifestation of this enthusiasm will be entirely out of place. We must not forget that when we reach our destination we shall meet Turks, Jews and Europeans of other denominations. Everybody should be treated in the same way. In a little while they will become our brothers as if they were true Greeks.

On May 14, 1919, the Greek mission in Smyrna read a statement announcing that Greek troops would be arriving the next day in the city. Smith reports that this news was "received with great emotion" by the Greek population of the city while thousands of Turkish residents gathered in the hill that night lighting fires and beating drums in protest. Later, translations of proclamations issued by the Turks during this occasion, showed that the intention was not purely pacific resistance. The same night, several hundred prisoners, mostly Turks, were released from a prison, with the complicity of the Ottoman authorities and Italian major in charge of the prison. Some of them armed themselves with purchased arms from a depot near the barracks.

The Greek occupation of Smyrna started the following day, where thousands were gathered on the seafront, waving Greek flags on the docks where the Greek troops were expected to arrive. The Metropolitan of Smyrna, Chrysostomos of Smyrna blessed the first troops as they arrived at 08:00. A colonel, who had neither the will nor the prestige to force himself relentlessly on his men, was in charge of the operation and neither the appointed High Commissioner nor high-ranking military individuals were there for the landing, resulting in miscommunication and a breakdown of discipline. Most significantly, this resulted in the 1/38 Evzone Regiment landing north of where they were to take up their post. As a result, they had to march south passing a large part of the Greek crowds celebrating the landing and also the Ottoman government Konak and the barracks of Ottoman troops. Someone other than the Greek soldiers fired a shot (Smith states that no one knows who despite multiple investigations) and chaos resulted with the Greek troops firing multiple shots into the Konak and the barracks. The Ottoman troops surrendered and the Greek regiment begun marching them up the coast to a ship to serve as a temporary prison. Allied officers in the harbor reported seeing Greek troops bayoneting multiple Turkish prisoners during the march and then saw them thrown into the sea. Prisoners were forced to shout "Long live Venizelos!" and "Long live Greece!". Donald Whittall, a British citizen and one of the few neutral observers during the landing, remarked about the treatment of Turkish prisoners, "They were made to go through no humiliation and received a good deal". But Whittall estimated that thirty unarmed prisoners were slaughtered. The captain of HMS Adventure reported that a Turkish officer, marching with his hands up, veered out of line. He was hit by a Greek soldier's rifle butt on the back of his head. When he tried to stand up he was hit again and bayoneted, before the top of his head was blown off.

Violence and disorder followed the landing and Greek troops and Greek citizens of Smyrna participated in these actions. Some shops belonging to Jews were also plundered by Greek soldiers. For the days following the landing, Greek troops arbitrarily detained around 2,500 people. Looting of Turkish houses in the city and in the surrounding areas began on the night of May 15 and continued for many days after that. The Inter-Allied Commission of Inquiry reported that:

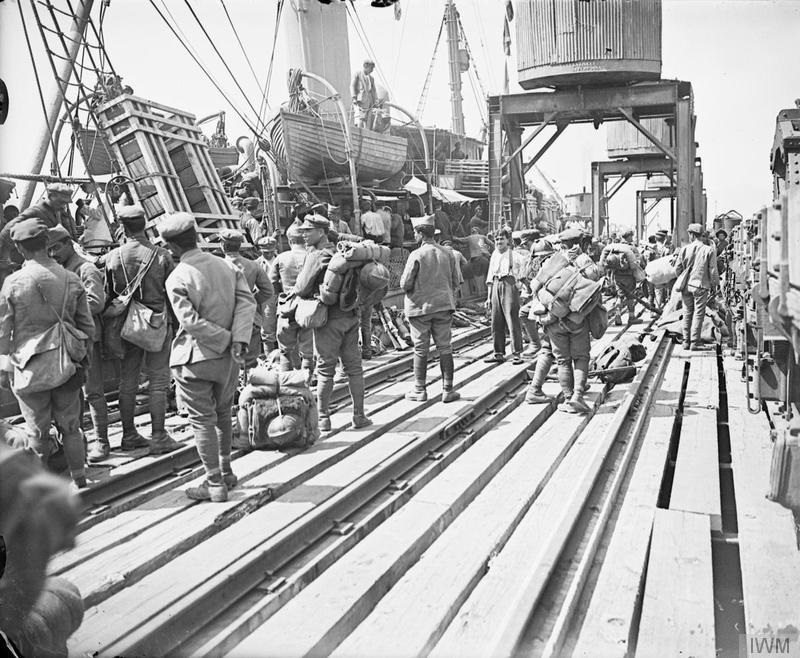
A photo of the Greek landing

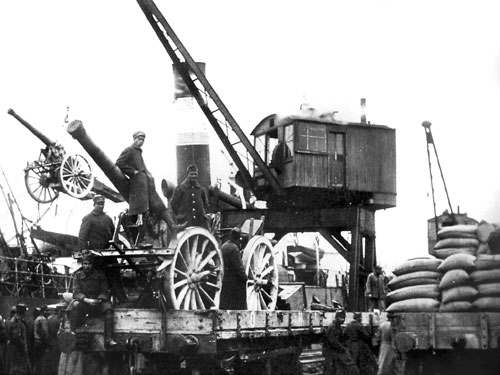
Greek troops loading artillery

Admiral Calthorpe left the area on May 21 and on May 23, the Greek commander in the area went against orders issued by the Allies and Venizelos by ordering the expansion of military operations in Aydın and Şuhut. These operations initially did not face significant resistance, but ethnic violence erupted along the way leading to significant violence and chaos; particularly in the Battle of Aydın from May 27 until June 27, 1919. In many areas, Greek forces demobilized the Ottoman police and then were forced to leave the area resulting in Turkish mobs, who escaped from jail, looting Greek property and killing Greek citizens. The nationalist group led by Yörük Ali also committed multiple massacres, rapes and other crimes against Greek civilians.

=== Inter-Allied Commission of Inquiry ===
As a response to the claims of violence, the French Prime Minister Clemenceau suggested an Interallied Commission of Inquiry to Smyrna: the commission was made up of Admiral Mark Lambert Bristol for the United States, General Bunoust for France, General Hare for England, General Dall'olio for Italy and, as a non-voting observer, Colonel Mazarakis for Greece. It began work in August 1919 and interviewed 175 witnesses and visited multiple sites of alleged atrocities. The decision reached was that when a Greek witness and Turkish witness disagreed, a European witness would be used to provide the conclusions for the report. This system was dismissed by Venizelos because he claimed that the Europeans living in Smyrna benefited from privileges given to them under the Ottoman rule and were thus opposed to Greek rule. The report was released to negotiators in October and generally found Greeks responsible for the bloodshed related to the landing and the violence throughout the Smyrna zone after the landing. In addition, the conclusions questioned the fundamental justification for the Greek occupation and suggested Greek troops be replaced by an allied force. According to the report, 300–400 Turkish civilians were killed or wounded. The U.S. Naval Officer of the USS Arizona, which was berthed at Smyrna harbor, initially estimated 100 Turks killed, but later revised it to 300–500 Turks killed with a total of 700–1000 casualties. Reverend Alexander MacLachlan, a Canadian in charge of the international college at Smyrna, reported to Mark L. Bristol a rough estimate of 300–500 Turks killed, later revising it to 400–600. The Ottoman government of the time estimated that 675 Turks were killed. On the other hand, according to the report of the Inter-Allied Commission of Inquiry, the Greek casualties were as follows: Greek army (2 killed, 6 wounded); 100 Greek civilians (20 killed, 20 drowned, 60 wounded). The U.S. Naval Officer of the USS Arizona estimated 2 killed and 15–20 wounded Greek soldiers, 20–30 killed and 40–50 wounded Greek civilians.

After the report's release, Venizelos accused the Commission of bias and of condemning Greece without giving them an opportunity to defend themselves. Nevertheless, Venizelos made sure to punish Greek soldiers who were found guilty of atrocities. Court martial on August 15, 1919 led by the Greek High Commissioner for the violence on May 15 and May 16 pronounced 74 convictions (including 48 Greeks, 13 Turks, 12 Armenians and one Jew). The Greek observer, Colonel Alexandros Mazarakis-Ainian, later wrote his own separate report on the massacres, including witnesses who were refused a hearing by the Commission. Eyre Crowe, a main British diplomat, dismissed the larger conclusion by saying the commission had overstepped its mandate.

Greek claims of bias have been mostly corroborated by modern research. The report's conclusions are, indeed, considered unreliable firstly because the commission was headed by pro-Turkish rear admiral Mark L. Bristol, who "had already reached his conclusion months before the investigation", and secondly because "the Turks went to great lengths to document Greek atrocities and sanitize reports of their own". There is also evidence that Bristol's intelligence officer, Robert Steed Dunn, had skewed the report against Greece. Harry Dwight Chamberlin found Dunn untrustworthy and Robert Woods Bliss sent a telegram to Warren Delano Robbins for Dunn to be sent away for this reason. Robbins proceeded to fire Dunn in 1922. It was later assessed by historian Peter M. Buzanski that Dunn's reports were "the result more of barroom gossip than of serious intelligence gathering".

In addition, according to historians Benny Morris and Dror Ze'evi: "[t]he commission made no mention of some 3,000 Aydın Greeks—men, women, and children—who were murdered, nor of 800 women and children deported inland" during the Battle of Aydın. In the city, irregular Turks had "torched the Greek quarter and massacred the remaining inhabitants". They note:

The Turks also accused the Greek army of levelling Aydın town and massacring civilians there. But the story was more complicated. When Turkish irregulars retook the town in July, armed locals joined in, firing from rooftops and windows at the retreating Greeks. In retaliation, they set fire to the Turkish quarter. The Turks then torched the Greek quarter and massacred the remaining inhabitants. Even Toynbee refused to sugarcoat what the Turks did to Greek noncombatants: “Women and children were hunted like rats from house to house, and civilians [...] were slaughtered in batches—shot or knifed or hurled over a cliff. [...] Many of the women... were violated.”

George William Rendel, a contemporary to the events, reported on the massacres of the Turks against the Greeks:

The greater part of its [Aydın's] inhabitants were killed, some being shot, others pierced with red hot irons, others cut to pieces and others put to death with the cruelest tortures. The inhabitants’ property was plundered, virgins were carried off to the mountains, and Aydin is a vast cemetery. After the destruction of Aydin 800 women and children were sent off by railway to Nazli and Denizli on June 18th and 19th 1919.

Historian Heinz A. Richter also agrees with the above assessments, stating that the Commission's report exaggerated reports of Greek excesses and showed biased anti-Greek tendencies.

== Aftermath ==
After the initial panic and for the next three years, the Greek zone of occupation was relatively tranquil. According to contemporaries, Smyrna, under the newly appointed Greek high commissioner Aristeidis Stergiadis was very well-governed and was "making a great and honest effort to see justice done to Turks". In addition, the conduct of Greek gendarmes in the region was praised.

According to historians Benny Morris and Dror Ze'evi: "The Greek administrators did their best to maintain law, order, and justice, shunning a policy of expulsion, as might have been expected from a vengeful occupier".

== Impact ==
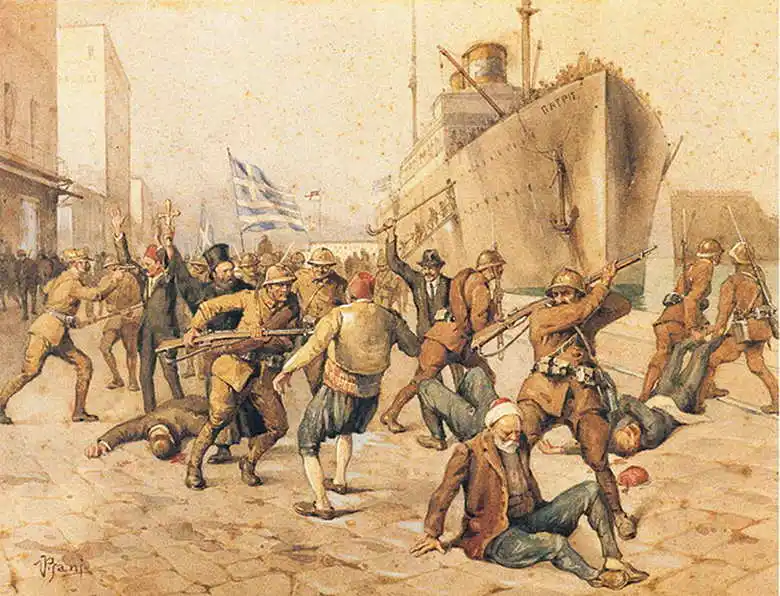
1921 illustration by Vittorio Pisani depicting the landing at Smyrna

The Turkish reaction to the Greek landing resulted in more violence in the region, as Turkish groups were ordered by Nureddin Pasha to begin committing new massacres against the civilian Greek communities residing outside of the occupation zone, bringing the ongoing Greek genocide to its apogee.

While there were large demonstrations against Allied Forces in Istanbul, in Anatolia the first armed clash between Turks and Greeks occurred on 28 May at Ödemiş. This was between a small body of Turks and the Greek Army. Afterwards, Turkish guerrilla warfare flared up along the Greek line of advance.

The Greeks created a system of administration in the Smyrna Zone that governed the area from 1919 until September 9, 1922. After the violence in May 1919, many of the Allies began to limit their support for the operation: France and Italy all became resistant to permanent Greek occupation and the stillborn Treaty of Sèvres in 1920 gave administrative control of the area to Greece, while Turkey would retain sovereignty, with permanent sovereignty to be decided after 5 years. The landing in Smyrna was sanctioned by article 69 also signed by the grand vizier of the Ottoman Empire, Damat Ferid Pasha, on behalf of the Ottoman Sultan Mehmet VI. On the other hand, it fuelled the Turkish nationalist movement under Mustafa Kemal and large scale atrocities against the Pontic Greek population in Eastern Anatolia. The Greek occupation ended when Turkish forces entered Smyrna (İzmir) on September 9, 1922, which led to the burning of Smyrna.

== See also ==
- Megali Idea
- Occupation of Smyrna
- Hasan Tahsin
- Outline and timeline of the Greek genocide

== Bibliography ==
- Celal Erikan, Komutan Atatürk, Cilt I-II, Üçüncü Basım, Türkiye İş Bankası Kültür Yayınları, İstanbul, 2001, ISBN 975-458-288-2. (in Turkish)
- Hakkı Güvendik, Türk İstiklâl Harbi, Batı Cephesi, Yunanlıların Batı Anadolu'da İstila Hareketlerine Başlamaları, İzmir’in İşgali, Mustafa Kemal Paşa'nın Samsun’a Çıkması, Millî Mukavemet'in Kurulması (May 15ıs – 4 Eylül 1919), Cilt 2, Kısım. 1, Genkurmay Başkanlığı Basımevi, Ankara, 1963. (in Turkish)
- Travis, Hannibal (2014). "How Scholars Unremembered the Assyrian and Greek Genocides in the Ottoman Empire". Hidden Genocides:Power, Knowledge, Memory. New Brunswick, New Jersey. ISBN 9780813561646.
- Michael Llewellyn-Smith, Ionian Vision : Greece in Asia Minor, 1919-1922., C. Hurst, 1999, London, New edition, 2nd impression.
- Zekeriya Türkmen, Mütareke Döneminde Ordunun Durumu ve Yeniden Yapılanması (1918–1920), Türk Tarih Kurumu Basımevi, 2001, ISBN 975-16-1372-8. (in Turkish)
- Solomonidis, Victoria (1984). "Greece in Asia Minor: The Greek Administration in the Vilayet of Aydin" (PDF). University of London, King's College.
