= Mehmet Suphi Kula =

Officer of the Ottoman Army and the general of the Turkish Army

Mehmet Suphi Kula 1316-Sv. 57
- Born: 1881; Monastir (Bitola), Ottoman Empire (modern North Macedonia)
- Died: October 19, 1948 (aged 66–67); Istanbul, Turkey
- Burial place: State Cemetery
- Military career
- Allegiance: Ottoman Empire; Turkey
- Service years: Ottoman: 1901–1920; Turkey: 1920–1931
- Rank: Mirliva
- Commands: Cavalry Company of the headquarters of the IX Corps, Verification Committee of Istanbul Central Command; 6th Cavalry Division, 14th Cavalry Division, 1st Cavalry Division, member of the Military Court of Cassation
- Conflicts: Balkan Wars; First World War; Turkish War of Independence; Turkish capture of Smyrna

Mehmet Suphi Kula (1881 in Monastir (Bitola) – October 19, 1948 in Istanbul) was an officer of the Ottoman Army and the general of the Turkish Army. He captured Smyrna from the Greek forces during the Turkish War of Independence.

== See also ==
- List of high-ranking commanders of the Turkish War of Independence

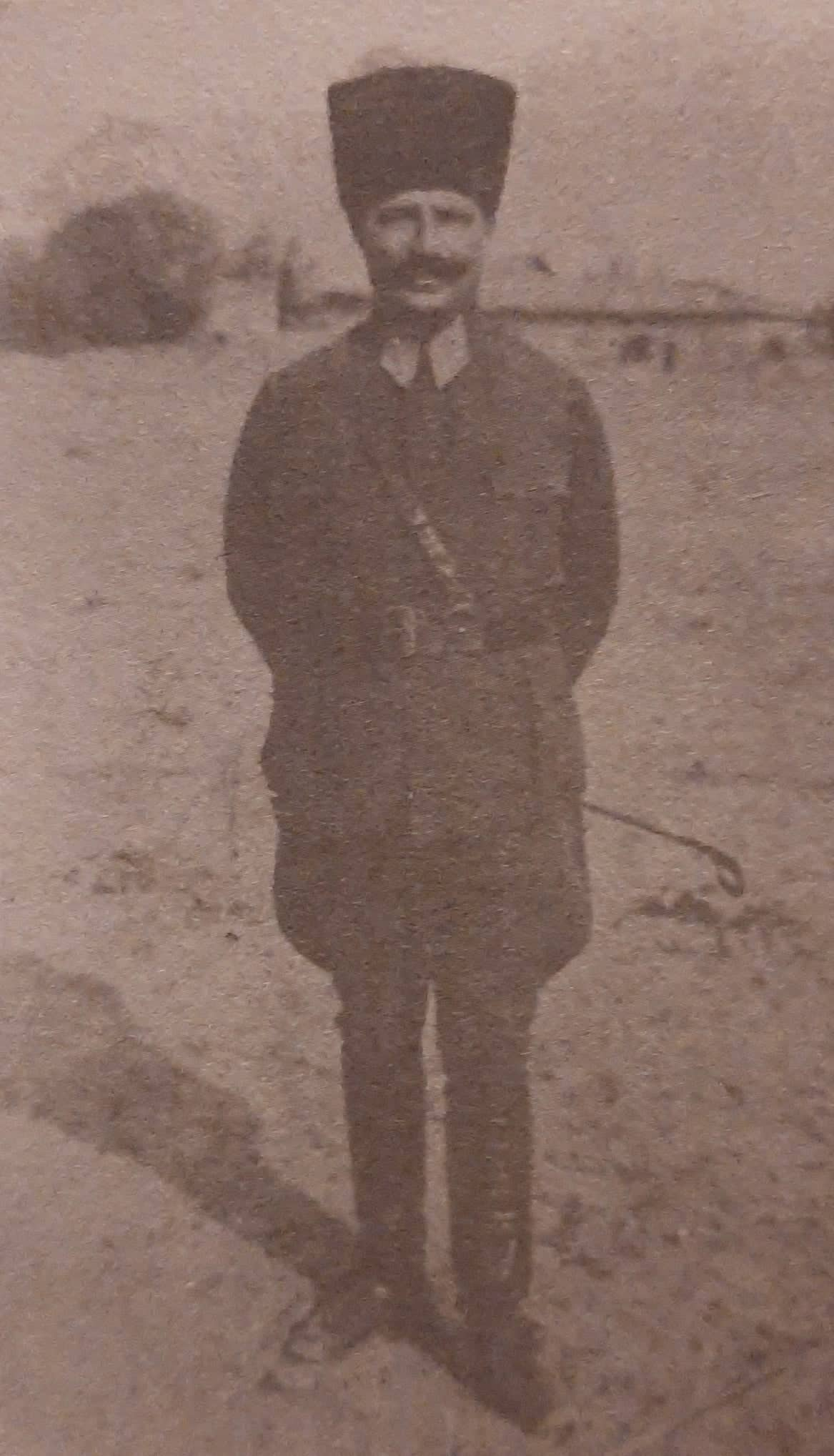
Commander of the 14th Cavalry Division, Colonel Mehmet Suphi Kula on the 16th of September 1922 after the Liberation of Çeşme with field uniform.
