= Nikolaos Zafeiriou =

Greek military officer (1871–1947)

- Νικόλαος Ζαφειρίου
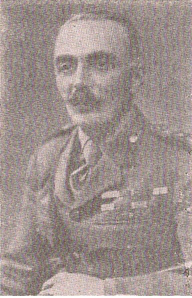
- A portrait of Zafeiriou.
- Born: c. 1871; Corinth, Kingdom of Greece
- Died: 1947 (age 75-76); Athens, Kingdom of Greece
- Alma mater: Hellenic Army Academy; École Militaire
- Military career
- Allegiance: Kingdom of Greece; Second Hellenic Republic
- Branch: Hellenic Army
- Service years: 1894–1926
- Rank: Lieutenant General
- Units: Army of Epirus; 8th Infantry Division
- Commands: Serres Division (1st Regiment); 1st Infantry Division; Army of Asia Minor; 3rd Infantry Division; II Army Corps; III Army Corps; V Army Corps
- Wars: Greco-Turkish War (1897); Balkan Wars; First Balkan War; Second Balkan War; World War I; Macedonian front; Greco-Turkish War (1919–1922); Greek landing at Smyrna; 11 September 1922 Revolution

Nikolaos Zafeiriou (Greek: Νικόλαος Ζαφειρίου; c. 1871 – 1947) was a Greek military officer.

Zafeiriou was born in Corinth in about 1871. After studies in the Hellenic Army Academy, he was commissioned as an Artillery 2nd Lieutenant in 1894. He fought in the Greco-Turkish War of 1897. At the outbreak of the First Balkan War he served in the staff of the Army of Epirus and later the 8th Infantry Division which was formed of it. After the Balkan Wars he attended the École Militaire in Paris.

In 1916 he joined the Provisional Government of National Defence and commanded the 1st Regiment of the Serres Division on the Macedonian Front. In May 1919, as commander of the 1st Infantry Division, he led the Greek landing at Smyrna and became the first head of the Army of Asia Minor. In 1923, he served as Deputy Chief of the General Staff, while in 1924 he was promoted to major general and commander of the 3rd Infantry Division. Subsequently promoted further to lieutenant general, he served consecutively as commander of the II, III and V Army Corps until his retirement in 1926.

He died in Athens in 1947.
