= Halkapınar =

Halkapınar literally means ringed river. It may be the following:

- Halkapınar, Çınar
- Halkapınar, Konya, a town in Konya
- Halkapınar Transfer Center, a large multimodal transportation center in İzmir.
- Halkapınar Facility, a maintenance facility and depot for the İzmir Metro
