= Mark Lambert Bristol =

American rear admiral (1868–1939)

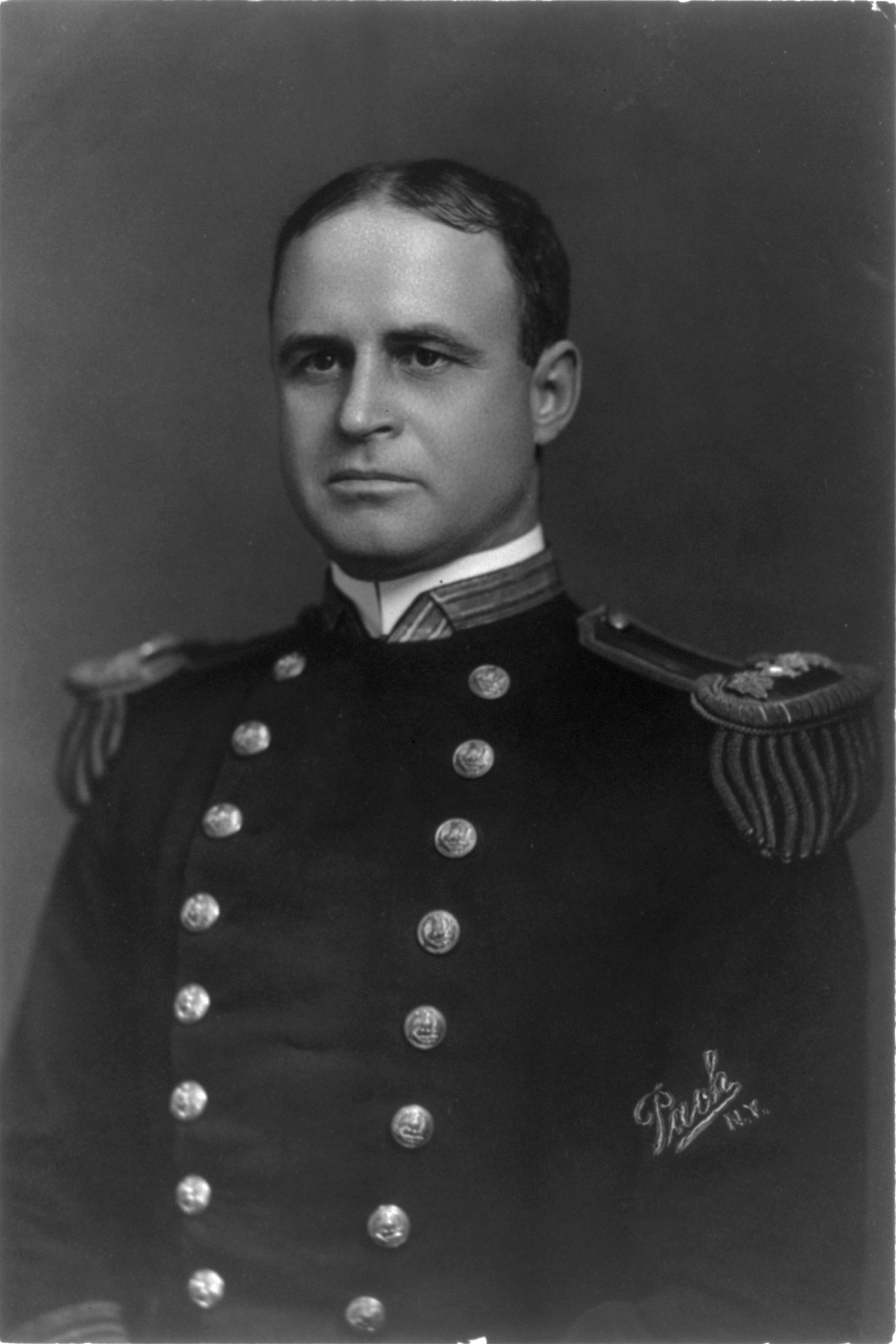
- Bristol in 1922
- Born: April 17, 1868; Glassboro, New Jersey, U.S.
- Died: May 13, 1939 (aged 71); Washington, D.C., U.S.
- Military career
- Allegiance: United States of America
- Branch: United States Navy
- Service years: 1887–1932
- Rank: Rear Admiral
- Conflicts: Spanish–American War • Battle of Santiago de Cuba; World War I Turkish War of Independence: Bombardment of Samsun
- Awards: Distinguished Service Medal

Mark Lambert Bristol (April 17, 1868 – May 13, 1939) was a rear admiral in the United States Navy who served as the United States High Commissioner to Turkey from 1919 to 1927.

== Biography ==
He was born on April 17, 1868, in Glassboro, New Jersey. Bristol graduated from the United States Naval Academy in 1887. During the Spanish–American War, he served aboard the battleship USS Texas and participated in the Battle of Santiago de Cuba. From 1901 to 1903, he served as aide to the Commander-in-Chief North Atlantic Fleet. He commanded the battleship USS Oklahoma during World War I.

He served as the US High Commissioner in Turkey (1919–1927). His correspondence and other documents that he gathered are often cited during discussions on numerous events of that era, including Turkish-Armenian relations in which he played a significant role in his opposition to Armenian aspirations and American involvement in assuming a mandate in Armenia.

Topics from the period include racial and religious conflicts in the Near East; the Great Fire of Smyrna; Allied activities in pursuit of special interests, mandates, and empire; the decline of the Ottoman Empire; and the rise of Mustafa Kemal and the Turkish National Movement, which led to the founding of modern Turkey.

Bristol came under fire from multiple groups for his inaccurate, pro-Turkish reporting during the Greco-Turkish War. He expressed openly Armenophobic, anti-Greek and antisemitic views, reducing the peoples of the region to racial stereotypes. He characterized Armenians as "a race like the Jews" with "little or no national spirit and poor moral character", and sought to minimize or discredit reports of atrocities against Armenian and Greek communities. Referring to the various ethnicities of Anatolia, he stated "the Turk is the best of the lot". His preference for Turkish nationalism was evident in his prediction that "not a single Armenian will be left in Anatolia", after which, he remarked, "We shall then witness a real, true Turkey for the Turks".

According to C. Lamb & I. Lamb (2022), Bristol "engineered a misleading report on the Greek occupation of Smyrna, filed false reports on Turkish massacres, promoted fake news through newsmen, and repeatedly inverted history in support of Turkish propaganda." He also deliberately misinformed the State Department in February 1920 regarding the massacre of Armenians in Cilicia, and supported the violent suppression of Kurdish revolts. Sir Horace Rumbold wrote how Bristol had "limited intelligence and outlook", whereas Lord Curzon called Bristol "stupid and at times malignant".

Surprisingly, in 1921, Arthur LeRoy Bristol managed to convince Mark Lambert Bristol (both Bristols are unrelated to each other) to issue a protest to Mustafa Kemal, in order to revoke an order of deportation concerning 10,000 to 12,000 Greeks, mostly women and children, from Samsun. This caused the Nationalists to back off from the deportation, likely saving the peoples' lives. However, Mark Lambert Bristol issued no other protest against any other deportations.

In 1927, Bristol assumed command of the Asiatic Fleet and helped found the American Hospital in Nişantaşı, İstanbul, in 1920 and the annexed nursing school, which is still named Admiral Bristol Nursing School after him.

Bristol served as chairman of the General Board of the United States Navy from 1930 to 1932 and died on May 13, 1939.

After his death, in 1945 he was honored by the renaming of the American Hospital in Turkey to the Admiral Bristol American Hospital.

== Namesakes ==
Two ships have been named USS Bristol in his honor.

== Bibliography ==
- Buzanski, Peter Michael (1960). Admiral Mark L. Bristol and Turkish-American relations, 1919–1922. University of California Press.
- Smyrna 1922: The Destruction of a City by Marjorie Housepian Dobkin (1971)
- Paradise Lost: Smyrna 1922 by Giles Milton, 2008, Sceptre, ISBN 978-0-340-83786-3
- The Thirty-Year Genocide: Turkey’s Destruction of Its Christian Minorities, 1894–1924 by Benny Morris and Dror Ze'evi
- The Blight of Asia: On the Systematic Extermination of Christian Populations in Asia by George Horton

Military offices
Preceded by Clarence S. Williams	Commander-in-Chief, United States Asiatic Fleet; 9 September 1927 – 9 September 1929	Succeeded by Charles B. McVay, Jr.
