= Allied Army of the Orient =

Unified command in Greece during WWI (1916–18)

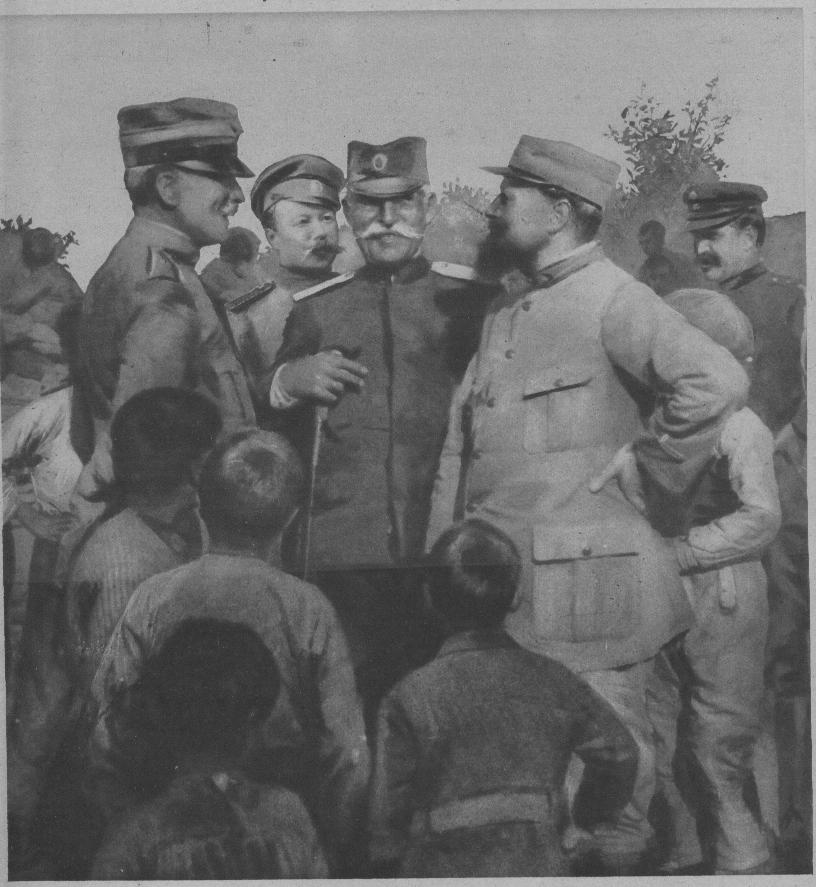
Allied collaboration: an Italian captain, a Russian lieutenant, a Serb colonel, a French lieutenant, and a Greek gendarme

The Allied Army of the Orient (AAO) (French: Armées alliées en Orient) was the name of the unified command over the multi-national allied armed forces on the Salonika front during the First World War.

When Germany, Austria-Hungary, and the newly joined ally, Bulgaria, were about to overrun Serbia in September–October 1915, the returning multi-national troops from the failed Gallipoli campaign disembarked in the Greek port of Salonika to establish the Macedonian Front. A side-effect of the landing was the further burdening of the National Schism between Constantine I of Greece and the Prime Minister Eleftherios Venizelos, ending in the forced resignation of the latter.

By August 1916, some 400,000 Allied soldiers from five different armies occupied the Salonika front. A unified command imposed itself and after long discussions, French General Maurice Sarrail was placed in command of all Allied forces at Salonika, although they retained right of appeal to their governments.

Greece itself remained at first neutral. After a coup on 30 August 1916, the Provisional Government of National Defence, led by Eleftherios Venizelos, was created in Salonika. It started assembling an army and soon participated in operations against the Central Powers. In June 1917, after increasing pressure from the allies, King Constantine I of Greece was forced to abdicate from the throne. Venizelos assumed control of the entire country and Greece officially declared war against the Central Powers on 30 June 1917. The Greek forces also started operating under the AAO command.

== Commanders of the AAO ==
- 11 August 1916: General Maurice Sarrail
- 15 December 1917: General Adolphe Guillaumat
- 17 June 1918: General Louis Franchet d'Espèrey

== Composition ==
=== France ===
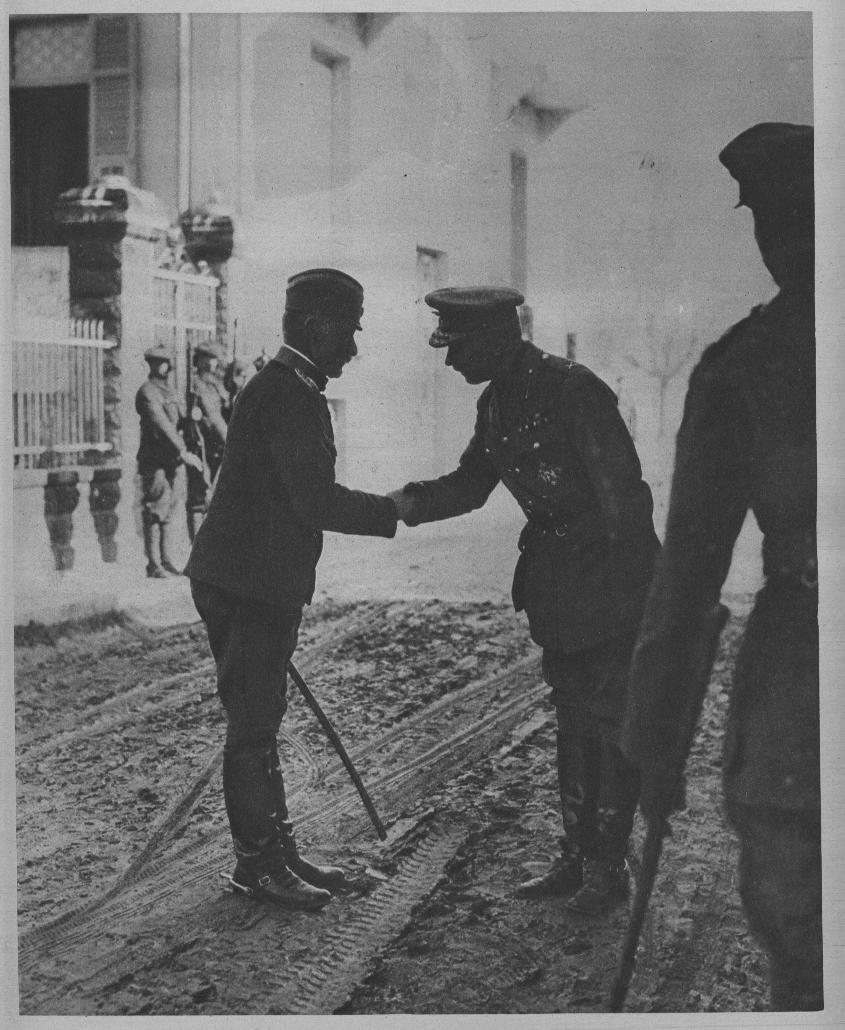
Serbian Field Marshal Živojin Mišić and British General George Milne

- Armée d'Orient (1915–19): 8 divisions

=== Great Britain ===
- British Salonika Army: 6 divisions

=== Serbia ===
The Serbian armies were corps sized formations.

- First Army, under command of Živojin Mišić and later Petar Bojović
- Second Army, under command of Stepa Stepanović
- Third Army, under command of Pavle Jurišić Šturm and later Colonel Miloš Vasić (dissolved in May 1917)

=== Russia ===
- 2 brigades of the Russian Expeditionary Force under command of Mikhail Diterikhs

=== Italy ===
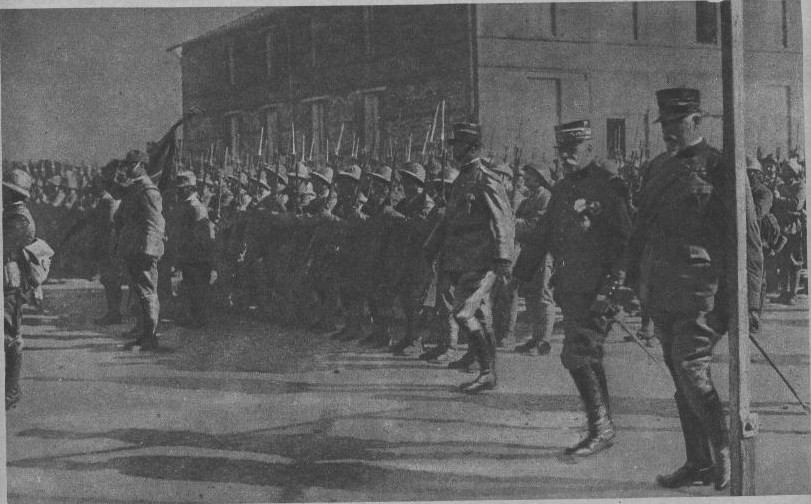
Sarrail and Petitti di Roreto on the arrival of the Italian troops in Salonika

- 35th Infantry Division (it:Corpo di spedizione italiano in Macedonia) under
  - Carlo Petitti di Roreto (July 1916 – April 1917)
  - Giuseppe Pennella (26 April – 24 May 1917)
  - Ernesto Mombelli (24 May 1917 – end 1918)
- XVI Italian Army Corps: This Corpo di spedizione Italiano in Oriente (CSIO), an Italian Army Corps in Albania, remained under direct Italian HQ command and thus wasn't part of the AAO
  - Emilio Bertotti (20 November 1915 – 8 March 1916)
  - Settimio Piacentini (8 March – 17 June 1916)
  - Oreste Bandini (18 June – 11 December 1916), was killed in the sinking of the Regina Margherita
  - Giacinto Ferrero (11 December 1916 - end of war)

=== Greece ===
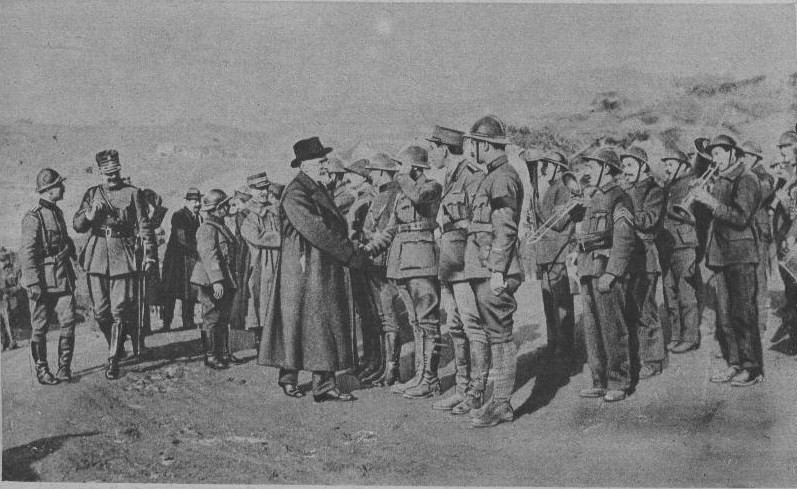
General Gérôme and Venizelos inspect Greek troops in Macedonia

- In September 1916, 10,000 men under command of Colonels Zymvrakakis and Mazarakis
- By January 1918, 10 divisions (204,000 men) under command of Panagiotis Danglis
  - I Army Corps (Lieutenant General Leonidas Paraskevopoulos)
    - 1st Larissa Division (Major-General Konstantinos Nider)
    - 2nd Athens Division (Colonel Ioulianos Kondoratos)
    - 13th Chalkida Division (Major General Ioakovos Negropondis)
  - National Defence Army Corps (Major General Emmanuil Zimvrakakis)
    - Serres Division (under Major General Epaminondas Zimvrakakis)
    - Archipelago Division (General Dimitrios Ioannou)
    - Crete Division (Major General Panayiotis Spiliades)
  - II Αrmy Corps (Lieutenant General Konstantinos Miliotis-Komninos)
    - 3rd Patras Division (Colonel Nikolaos Trikoupis)
    - 4th Nafplion Division (Colonel Nikolaos Vlachopoulos)
    - 14th Kalamata Division (Colonel Ioannis Orfanides)
  - Reserves
    - 9th Nafplion Division (Major General Georgios Leonardopoulos)

=== Others ===
- Portugal: 1 brigade
- Albania: 1,000 irregular troops under Essad Pasha Toptani
- Montenegro: irregular troops
