= National Defence coup d'état =

1916 military uprising in Thessaloniki, Greece

- Part of the National Schism
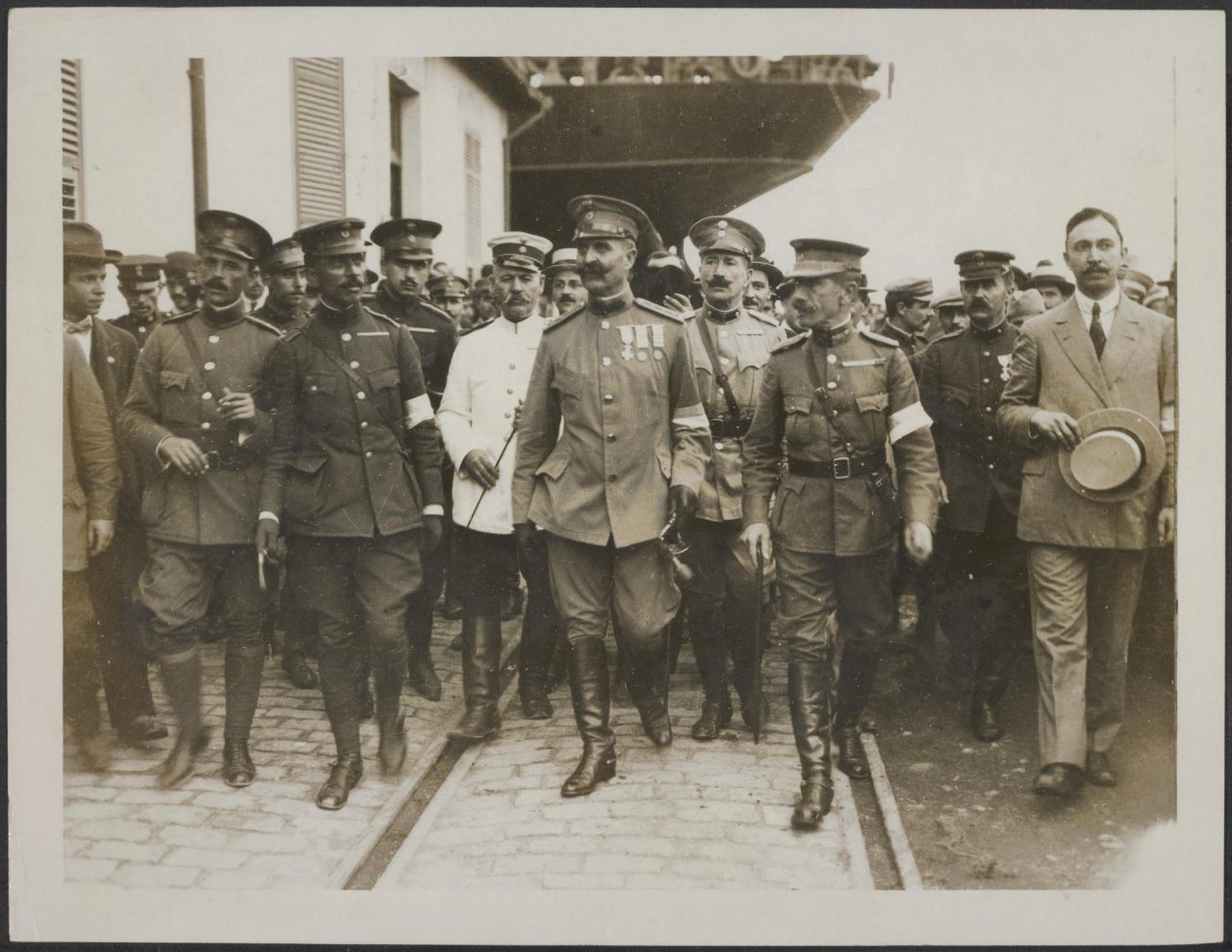
- Colonel Christodoulou (centre) is welcomed to Thessaloniki by Major General Zymvrakakis (third from right) and other members of the National Defence.
Date	17 August 1916
Location	Thessaloniki, Greece

Belligerents
Kingdom of Greece	(Greece) Provisional Government of National Defence

Commanders and leaders
Constantine I	Eleftherios Venizelos; Pavlos Kountouriotis; Panagiotis Danglis

Units involved
Hellenic Army	National Defence Army Corps

Political support
Central Powers; Germany; Austria-Hungary	Entente Powers; France; United Kingdom

The National Defence coup d'état (Greek: Κίνημα της Εθνικής Αμύνης) was a military uprising in Thessaloniki on 17 August 1916, by Hellenic Army officers opposed to the neutrality followed by the royal government in Athens during World War I, and sympathetic to former Prime Minister Eleftherios Venizelos and the Entente Powers. With the support of Entente forces present in the area as part of the Salonica front, the coup established control of Thessaloniki and much of the wider region. Soon afterwards, Venizelos and his leading followers arrived in the city to establish a Provisional Government of National Defence, which entered World War I on the side of the Entente. These events marked the culmination and entrenchment of the "National Schism" in Greek politics.

== Events ==
Incensed by the successive humiliations and the Bulgarian advance in Macedonia, several Greek officers had gone to Thessaloniki and volunteered to raise troops and join the Allies. The local Allied commander-in-chief, Maurice Sarrail, welcomed their initiatives, but little headway was made due to the opposition of the Greek government. On 16/29 August, the Lt. Colonel Konstantinos Mazarakis-Ainian tried to seize control of the 11th Infantry Division's mountain artillery battalion, and lead it to the front. This was opposed by Colonel Nikolaos Trikoupis, the chief of staff and acting commander of III Army Corps, who sent two companies to the artillery barracks at Mikro Karabournou that forced Mazarakis to abandon his attempt and withdraw from the barracks.

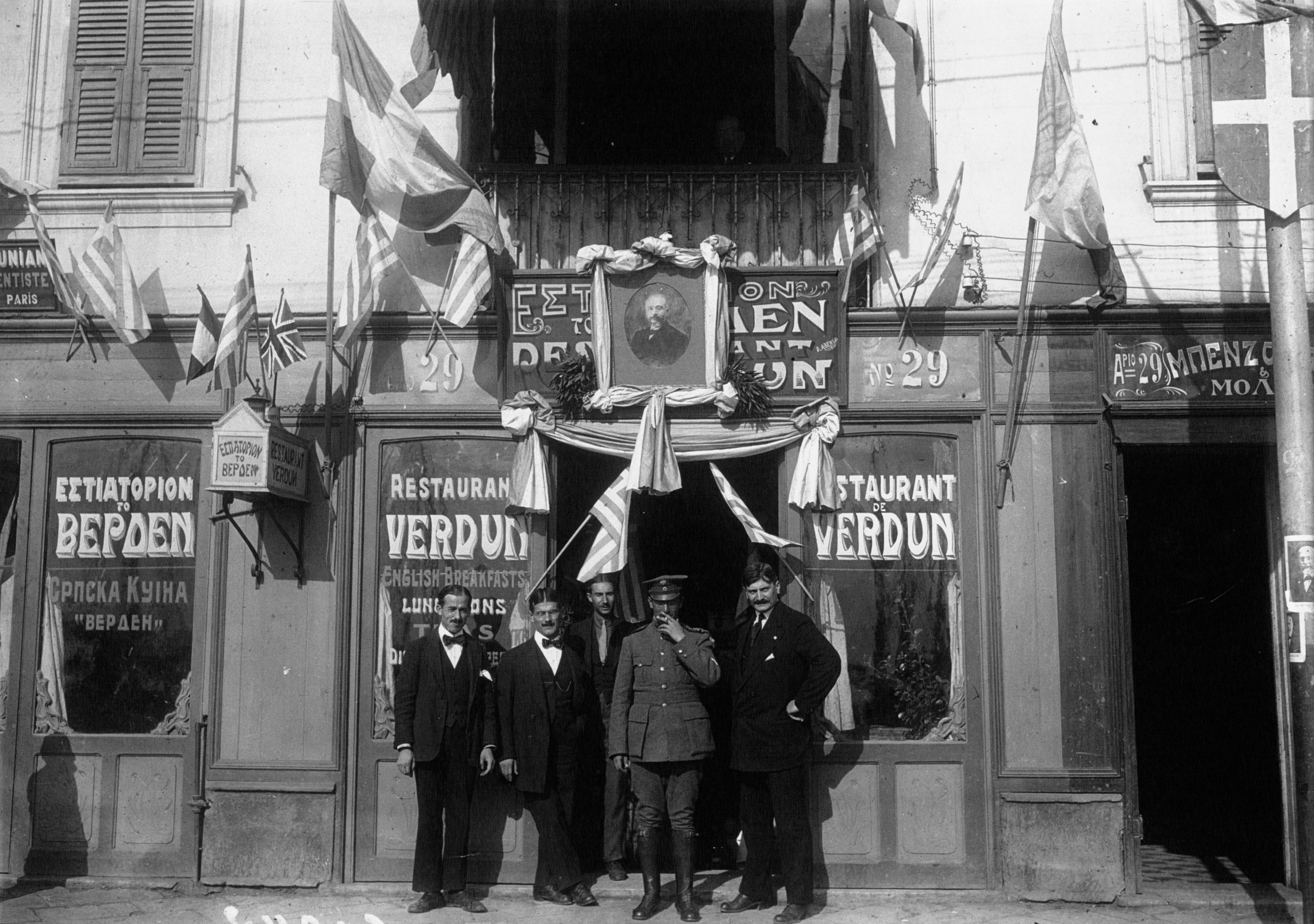
Restaurant "Verdun" in Thessaloniki, decorated in support of Venizelos and the National Defence regime, 1916.

This incident sparked the flame of a wider uprising on the next day, 30 August [O.S. 17 August], by the city's pro-Venizelist officers. Under the command of Lt. Colonel Epameinondas Zymvrakakis, about 600 men of the Cretan Gendarmerie with three volunteer companies under Major Neokosmos Grigoriadis and thirty other officers blockaded the headquarters of III Corps. When a company under Colonel Vagias tried to break through the blockade, shots were fired that killed two gendarmes and wounded three others. In response, the Cretans fired back, killing or wounding three or four soldiers. The firefight was stopped by the intervention of French officers. Sarrail arrived on the scene soon after, and commanded all Greek officers who would not join the newly formed "National Defence Committee" uprising to be shipped to southern Greece. The loyalist troops were disarmed and interned in the hopes that they would join the uprising, but in the event most of them refused and had to be sent to southern Greece as well.

Individual officers from across northern Greece began to flock to Thessaloniki, and on 15 September [O.S. 2 September], the "National Defence" received its first substantial reinforcement, as Colonel Nikolaos Christodoulou arrived in the city with the remnants of IV Corps that had refused to surrender and instead withdrawn via Kavala and Samothrace. Already on 21 September [O.S. 8 September], the volunteers under Major Grigoriadis formed the 1st Battalion of the "Army of National Defence", and departed for the front lines along the Strymon river.

== Sources ==
- Επίτομη ιστορία της συμμετοχής του Ελληνικού Στρατού στον Πρώτο Παγκόσμιο Πόλεμο 1914 - 1918 [Concise History of the Hellenic Army's Participation in the First World War 1914–1918] (in Greek). Athens: Hellenic Army History Directorate. 1993.
