= Battle of Skra-di-Legen =

1918 battle in the Macedonian front of WW1

Coordinates: 41°05′20″N 22°23′40″E

- Part of the Macedonian front of World War I
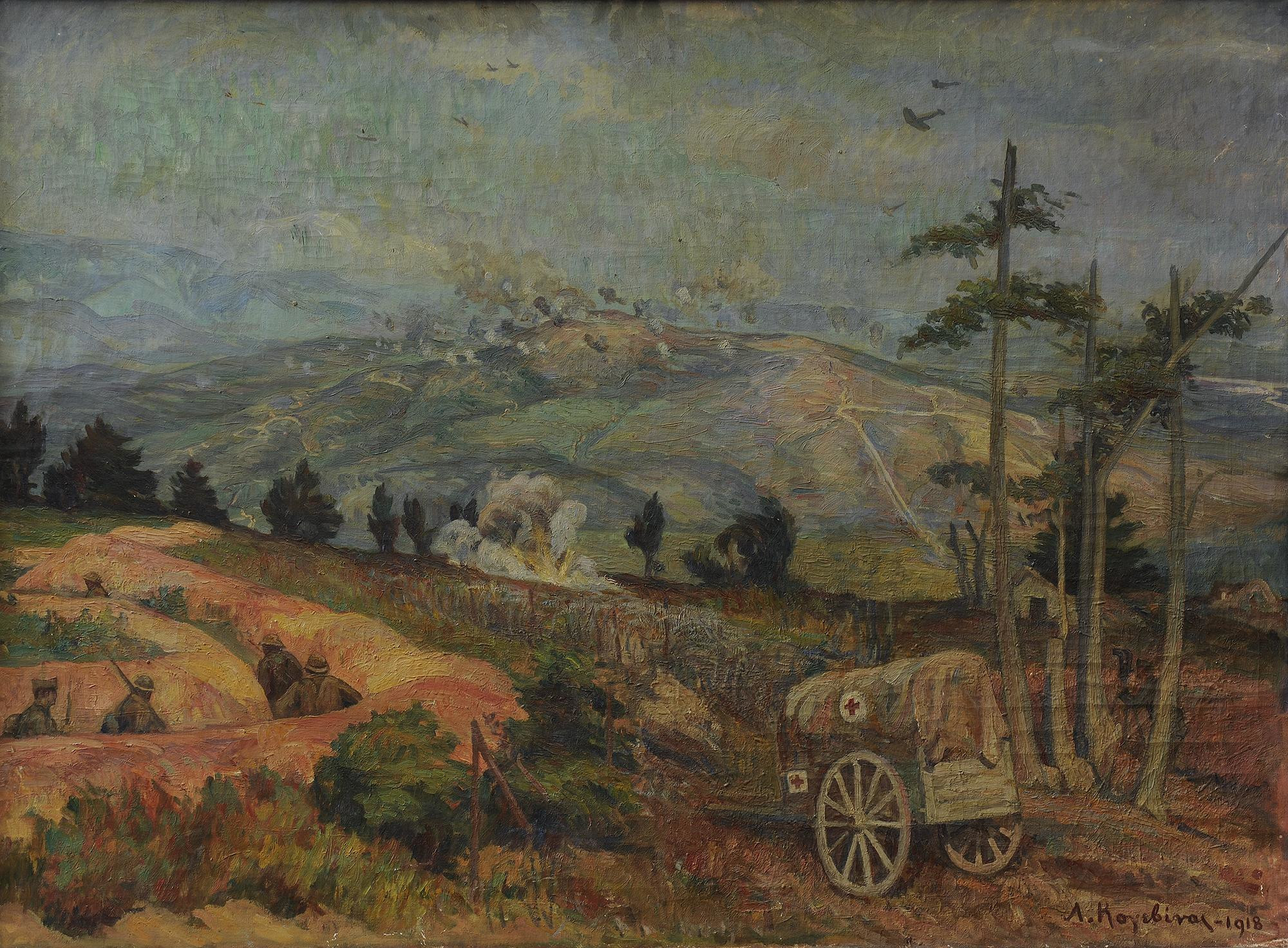
- Lykurgos Kogevinas, 'The Battle of Skra, 1918', oil on canvas, National Gallery, Athens
Date	29–31 May 1918
Location	Skra, Kingdom of Greece (present-day Greece)
Result	Allied victory

Belligerents
Allied Powers: Greece; France; British Empire	Bulgaria

Commanders and leaders
(Kingdom of Greece) Emmanouil Zymvrakakis; (French Third Republic) Adolphe Guillaumat; (French Third Republic) Auguste Gérôme	(Tsardom of Bulgaria (1908–1946)) Ivan Bonchev

Units involved
Greece: National Defense Army Corps; Archipelago Division; 5th Regiment; 6th Regiment; Cretan Division; 7th Regiment; 8th Regiment; Serres Division; 1st Regiment; France: 122nd Infantry Division; 84th Infantry Regiment; British Empire: Royal Garrison Artillery; 424th Siege Battery; 190th Heavy Battery	Bulgaria: 5th Division; 3rd Brigade

Strength
(Kingdom of Greece) 5 regiments (from 3 divisions); (French Third Republic) 1 brigade with cannons and flamethrowers; (United Kingdom of Great Britain and Ireland) 2 Artillery batteries	(Tsardom of Bulgaria (1908–1946)) 1 brigade

Casualties and losses
441 killed; 2,227 wounded; 164 missing	600 killed; 2,313 captured (included wounded); 12 artillery pieces and 32 machine guns, as well as other equipment captured

The Battle of Skra-di-Legen was a two-day battle which took place at the Skra fortified position, located northeast of Mount Paiko, which is north-west of Thessaloniki, on May 29–30, 1918, on the Macedonian front of World War I. The battle was the first large-scale employment on the front of Greek troops of the National Defense Army Corps (Greece, united after the National Schism, had joined the war in summer 1917), and resulted in the elimination of a whole enemy regiment (the 49th) and the capture of the heavily fortified Bulgarian positions.

The Allied force comprised three Greek divisions of the National Defense Army Corps under Lieutenant General Emmanouil Zymvrakakis, plus one French brigade. The three Greek divisions comprised:

- The Archipelago Division under Major General Dimitrios Ioannou,
- The Crete Division under Major General Panagiotis Spiliadis,
- The Serres Division under Lieutenant Colonel Epameinondas Zymvrakakis.

The 5th and 6th Regiments from the Archipelago Division were in the center, the 7th and 8th Regiments from the Crete Division were on the right flank, and the 1st Regiment of the Serres Division was on the left.

== Battle ==
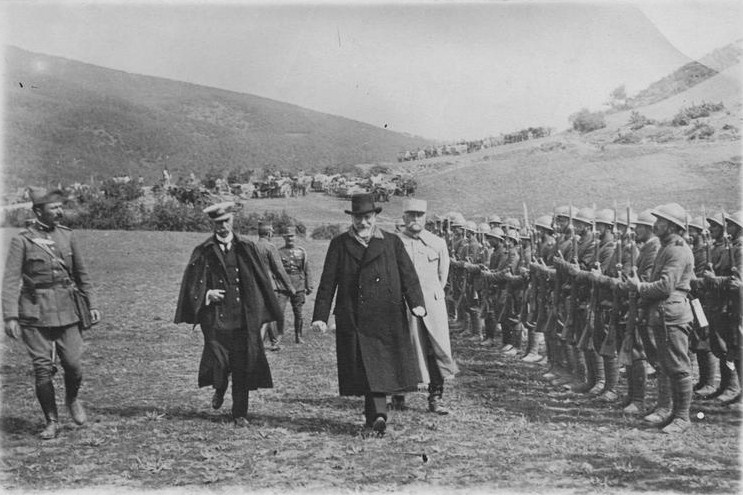
Eleftherios Venizelos inspecting Greek troops in 1918

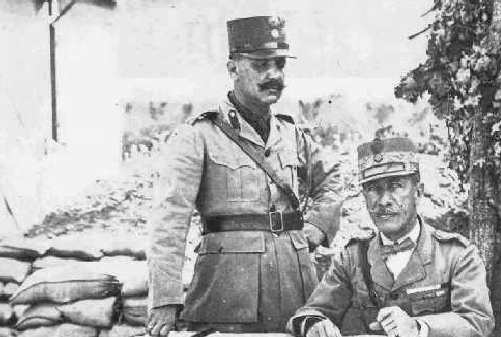
Lieutenant General Emmanouil Zymvrakakis (right) with his Chief of Staff

The Bulgarians occupied a strong position on a massif, presenting an awkward salient for the Allies. Fortified shelters lay under protective slabs of rock and a cluster of machine-gun emplacements rose like steps up the face of the cliff. In the early morning of 29 May 1918, along with two British 8-inch guns, Greek and French artillery fired on Bulgarian positions in preparation for the next morning's assault. British heavy batteries on the left bank of the Vardar contributed to the bombardment. A simultaneous bombardment on the main Doiran front north of Salonika was designed to keep the Bulgarians guessing. At dawn (04.55) on 30 May 1918, Greek troops, in "a brilliant bayonet charge under withering fire," rushed the enemy trenches, the 1st (Serres) and 5th and 6th (Archipelago) Regiment capturing the heights of Skra at 6.30 from the outnumbered Bulgarians, while the 7th (Cretan) seized them between the two branches of the Liumnitsa River. On a 12 km. front, to a depth of 2 km., a complex maze of fortifications and trenches was captured. Starting from the evening of the same day until 31 May, the Bulgarian army launched several counterattacks on positions held by the Crete Division. All attacks were repelled, cementing the Allied victory. The Greek troops were then sent into the second lines to recuperate and were relieved by French troops.

In the battle, 441 Allied soldiers were killed, 2,227 wounded, and 164 missing in action.

Bulgaria suffered 600 soldiers killed and 2,045 taken prisoner. 200 German military personnel (mostly signallers) were among the captured. 12 artillery pieces, 32 machine guns, and other equipment were also seized.

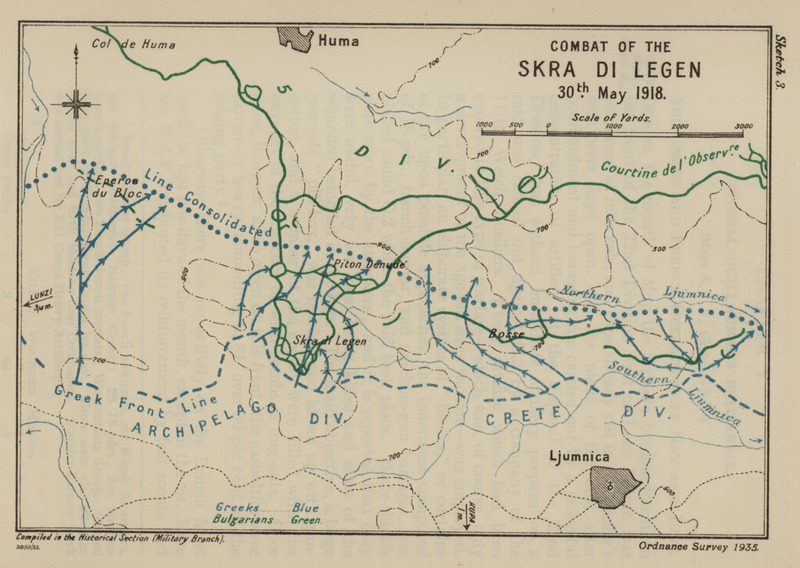
Map of Battle of Skra, Ordnance Survey Historical Section, 1935

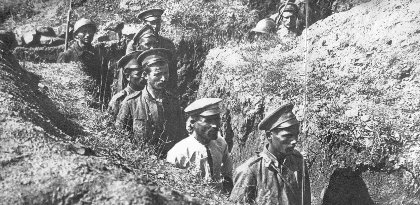
Bulgarian POWs

== Importance and aftermath ==
The battle was vital for progress on the Macedonian front, as the Allies finally broke the Bulgarian positions after a year of unsuccessful attacks. The failure of a fresh Bulgarian counterattack to materialize in the days following the battle was one of the first significant signs of the enemy's depressed morale. Field-Marshal Hindenburg later revealed in his memoirs that the troops detailed for a counterattack had refused to march. The Battle of Skra was the last engagement on the Macedonian front before the final offensive of September 1918.

The operation's objectives, however, were "almost more political than military." Success, it was reckoned, would be a boost for the pro-Allied Venizelist party in Greece and Greece's confidence in its army at a time when German-trained and equipped Bulgarians in defensive positions were considered in Athens likely to be stronger than Greeks trained by the French for the attack. The Greek Army, despite its successes in the Balkan Wars of 1912-13, was before Skra thought by some Western strategists to be of poor quality, a view dating from its defeat in the Greco-Turkish War of 1897. This view, however, was not shared by General Guillaumat, commander of the Allied Army of the Orient in Salonika, whose opinion of the Greek troops was positive and who attached considerable importance to them. To the Venizelist National Army of Zymvrakakis, he was able to add, mainly through diplomatic handling of King Alexander, 20,000 former royalist troops.

The manner of the Greek army's victory at Skra boosted its confidence and won it the esteem of the Allies, drawing a telegram to Greek Prime Minister Eleftherios Venizelos from Guillaumat telling him "This victory will fill all Greece with legitimate pride." In the words of the official British history, "Brilliant feat of arms as it was, few actions so small have made so much stir", as Guillaumat and the Greek press celebrated the success, which was a major morale boost and gave legitimacy to Venizelos and the pro-Allied cause in Greece, still bitterly divided over the National Schism. After years of doubt, belief in an eventual Allied victory in the war took hold in Greece after Skra. The personal prestige of Venizelos rose even in royalist areas such as the Peloponnese where he had been unpopular and where there had been difficulties in mobilization. The outcome of the battle removed these hesitations. Major General Ioannou, commanding the Archipelago Division, also distinguished himself for his courage.

Skra led to Guillaumat being recalled to France by Clemenceau to be at hand to take over on the Western Front should Foch or Pétain fail. The Greek success at Skra later helped Venizelos persuade the new Allied commander in Salonika, General Franchet d'Espèrey, to modify his plans so that the Greek army be allowed a greater role in the coming push. Consequentially, in the final offensive in September 1918, which breached the German coalition's defences, there were Greek divisions at five points in the broad Allied line of attack. The importance of the May battle, despite its comparatively small numbers, was appreciated by the Allies after the war. In the victory march in Paris in 1919, along with the names of Marne, Somme, Verdun, and many others, appeared the name of Skra-di-Legen.

The nearest village to the battlefield was called Liumnitsa at the time. 'Skra-di-Legen' appeared on the Austrian wartime 1:200,000 staff map and gave its name to the battle. The village, northwest of Axioupoli and near the Greek border with North Macedonia, was later renamed just Skra.

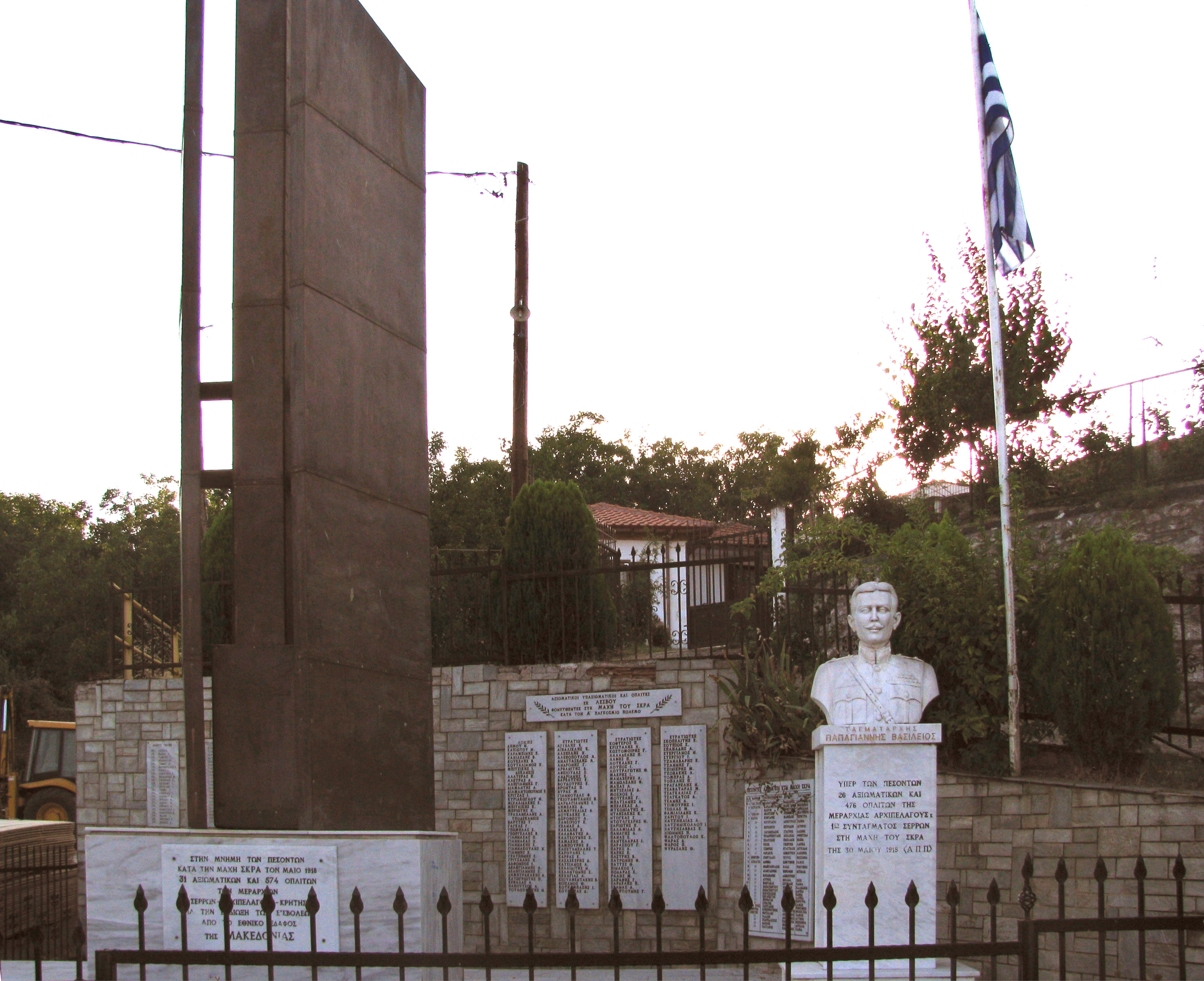
Monument to the fallen Greeks, Skra, 2010

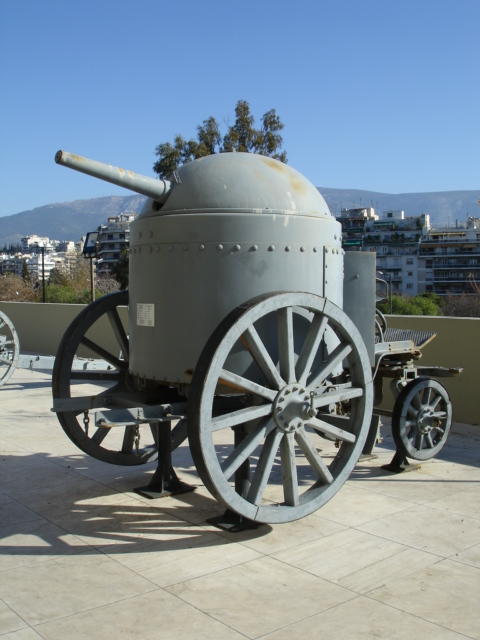
A German cannon turret (Gruson 5.3cm L/24 fahrpanzer) captured by the Allies at Skra, held at the Athens War Museum in Greece

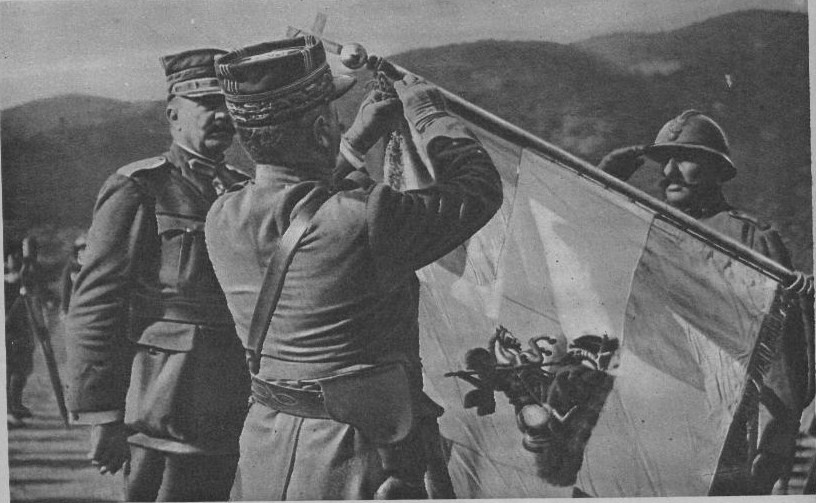
Allied commander-in-chief Louis Franchet d'Espèrey decorates the battle flag of the 5th Archipelago Regiment in June 1918, with commander Dimitrios Ioannou to his left

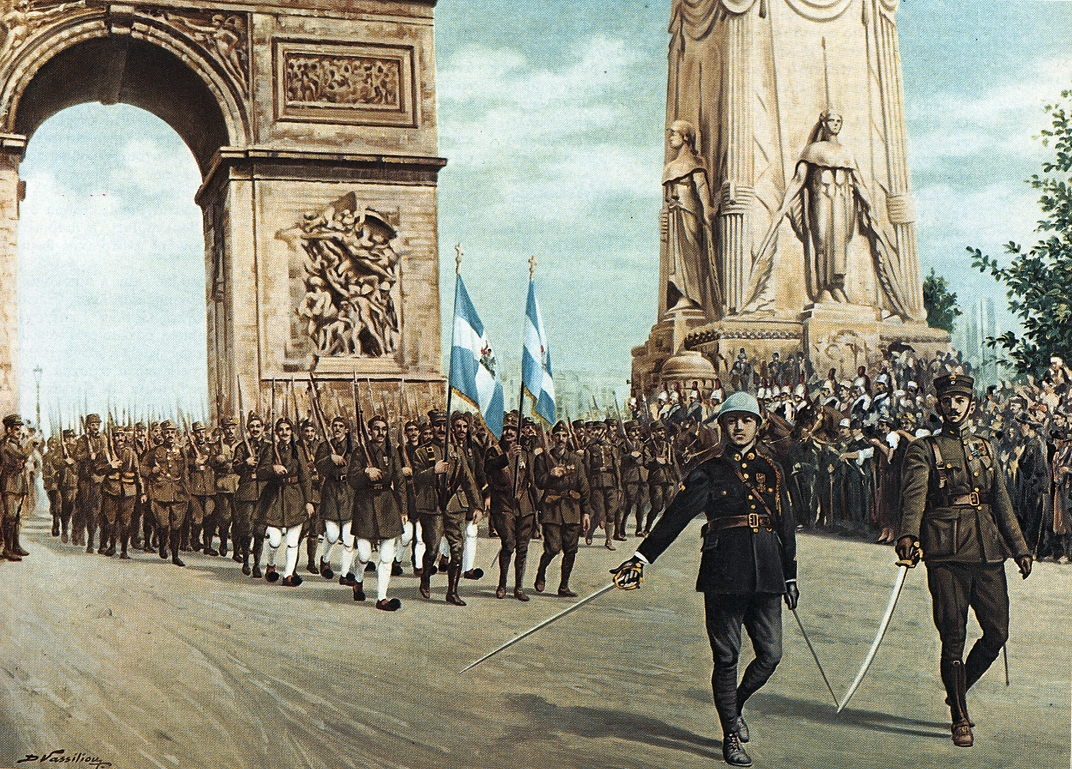
Greek troops in the victory march, Paris, 1919

== Bibliography ==
- Falls, Cyril Bentham (1935). Military Operations Macedonia. From the Spring of 1917 to the End of the War. History of the Great War based on Official Documents. London: His Majesty’s Stationery Office.
- Villari, Luigi (1922). The Macedonian Campaign. London.
- Charles F. Horne, Source records of the Great War, Volume VI, National Alumni 1923
- Grigorios Dafnis, Sofoklis Eleftheriou Venizelos, Ikaros, Athens 1970, pages 44–47
