= Auguste Gérôme =

- Born: 2 March 1857; Badonviller, Meurthe, French Empire
- Died: 10 May 1919 (aged 62); Marseille, Bouches-du-Rhône, French Republic
- Military career
- Allegiance: France
- Branch: French Army
- Service years: 1875 – 1919
- Rank: General de brigade
- Commands: 78th Infantry Brigade; 48th Infantry Brigade; 122nd Infantry Division
- Conflicts: World War I: Macedonian front; Battle of Skra-di-Legen
- Awards: Legion of Honor (Commandeur); Croix de guerre 1914–1918

Auguste Clément Gérôme (1857–1919) was a French general who notably served at the Macedonian front of World War I.

== Biography ==
Gérôme was born on 2 March 1857 in Badonviller, Meurthe. He was the son of Clément Gérôme, a non-commissioned officer in the French Army, and Marguerite Guillemette. On 26 December 1881, he married Élisabeth Léonie Léonard, originally from Nancy. He enlisted on 14 March 1869 and served in the 60th Infantry Regiment. He attended the École spéciale militaire de Saint-Cyr from 23 October 1875 to 1 October 1877, and afterwards was assigned to the 69th Infantry Regiment as a second lieutenant. He attended the War College from November 1884 to 28 November 1886, graduating with a staff patent. Then he was sent to Algeria to work on military maps from 12 January 1887 to 24 June 1887. During World War I, he served on the frontlines of the French Army of the East and eventually commanded the 122nd Infantry Division. Gérôme died from war wounds on 10 May 1919 in Marseille.

== Awards ==
- Legion of Honour, knight (29 December 1898)
- Legion of Honour, officer (11 July 1914)
- Legion of Honour, commander (16 December 1915)
- Croix de guerre 1914–1918 (13 August 1914)

=== Foreign Awards ===
- Serbia: Order of the White Eagle, knight
- United States: Distinguished Service Medal

== Works ==
- History of the 75th Infantry Regiment, under the leadership of Colonel Pedoya 1891, Paris;
- Historical essay on the tactics of the cavalry, 1900, Paris;
- Historical essay on infantry tactics from the organization of the standing army to the present day, 1903, Paris;
- Campaign of 1813, 1904, Paris.
