= Emmanouil Zymvrakakis (army general) =

Hellenic Army officer

- Εμμανουήλ Ζυμβρακάκης
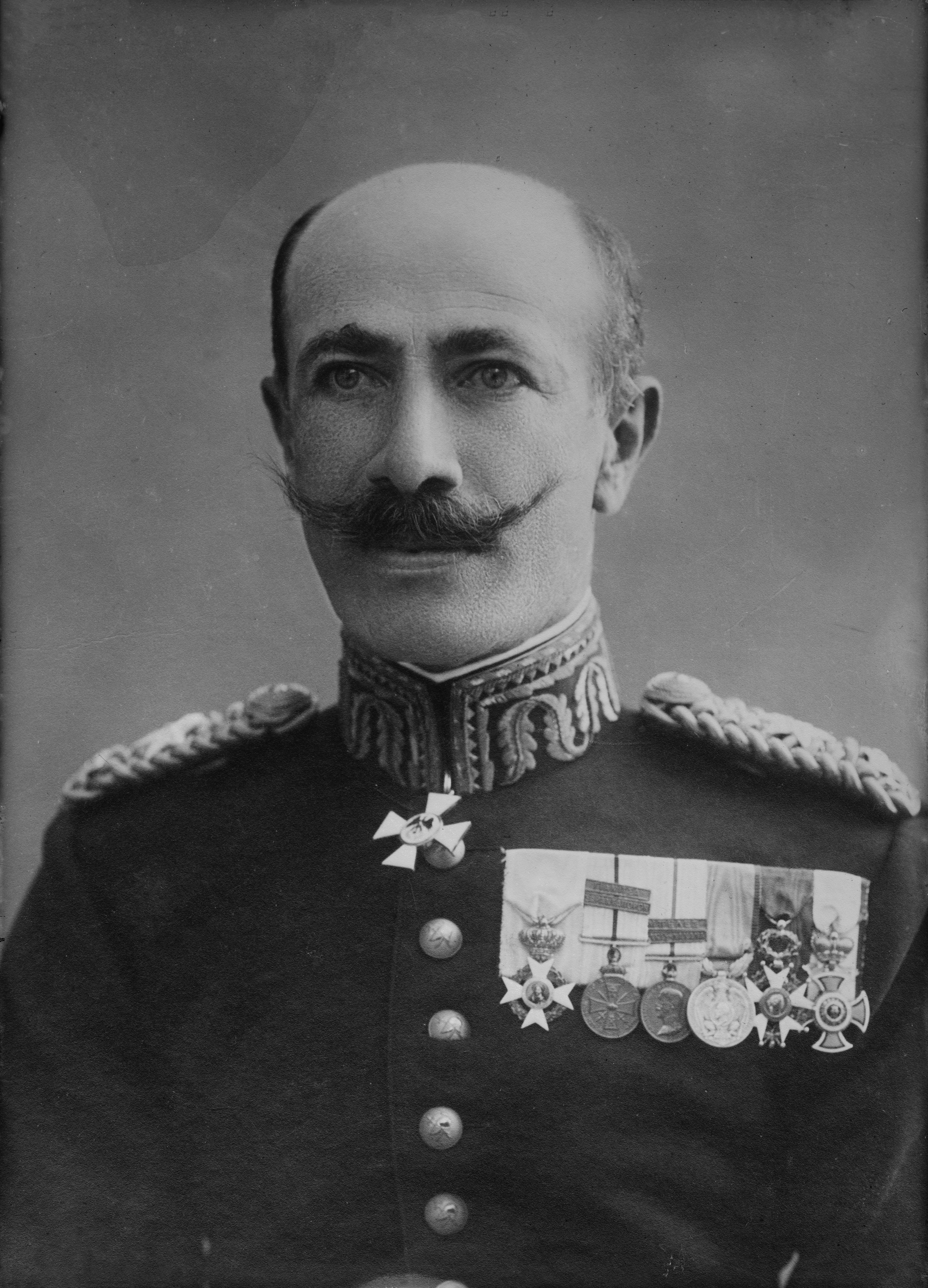
- Zymvrakakis c. 1916
- Born: c. 1858; Nafplio, Kingdom of Greece
- Died: c. 1928 (aged 69–70); Athens, Kingdom of Greece
- Education: Hellenic Army Academy
- Military career
- Allegiance: Kingdom of Greece; Provisional Government of National Defence
- Branch: Hellenic Army
- Service years: 1878–1920
- Rank: Lieutenant General
- Conflicts: Greco-Turkish War (1897); Cretan State; Balkan Wars; First Balkan War; Battle of Yenidje; Battle of Sarantaporo; Second Balkan War; Battle of Kilkis-Lachanas; World War I; Macedonian front; Battle of Skra-di-Legen; Battle of Doiran (1918); Greco-Turkish War (1919–1922)
- Awards: Order of the Redeemer; Legion of Honour

Emmanouil Zymvrakakis (Greek: Εμμανουήλ Ζυμβρακάκης, 1858–1928) was a Hellenic Army officer who rose to the rank of lieutenant general, and was distinguished in World War I.

== Biography ==
He was born to the expatriate Cretan Charalambos Zymvrakakis in Nafplio in 1858. His younger brother was Epameinondas Zymvrakakis, who also became a lieutenant general in World War I. He graduated the Hellenic Military Academy as an Artillery Ensign. Named 2nd Lieutenant in 1881, he went on to continue his studies at Orléans in France.

In 1897, he volunteered for and fought in the Cretan Revolt in the Greek expeditionary corps under Colonel Timoleon Vassos. He later became an active member of the Military League, and it was he who suggested, following the Goudi coup, to call upon the Cretan Eleftherios Venizelos to come to Greece.

Subsequently, he served as adjutant to King George I of Greece and King Constantine I of Greece during the Balkan Wars. He was then promoted to major general and appointed commander of the newly raised 11th Infantry Division at Thessaloniki in late 1913. From this position he was among the main driving figures behind the pro-Venizelist National Defence coup d'état of August 1916, which established the Provisional Government of National Defence in the city. He helped organize the new government's army, and led the National Defence Army Corps on the Macedonian front in 1917 and until the Battle of Skra-di-Legen in May 1918. During the Battle of Doiran in 1918 he commanded the Greek forces (Serres Division and Crete Division).

Subsequently, he was tasked with the occupation of Western and Eastern Thrace, territories that had been ceded to Greece from Bulgaria and the Ottoman Empire respectively. In the latter case he defeated the resistance offered by the remaining Ottoman forces in the region. Following the electoral defeat of the Venizelists in 1920, he was dismissed from his post.

He died in Athens in 1928.
