= Nikolaos Christodoulou =

Greek army general (1863–c. 1924)

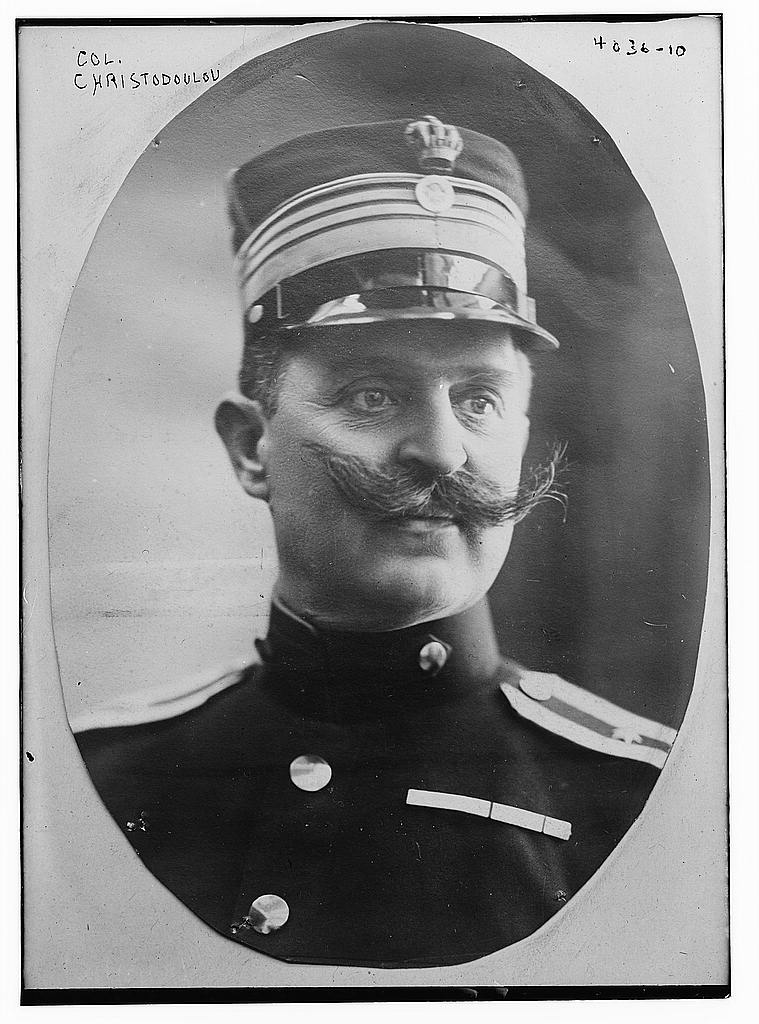
- Christodoulou c. 1916
- Native name: Νικόλαος Χριστοδούλου
- Born: 1863; Chalcis, Greece
- Died: c. 1924 (aged c. 61)
- Allegiance: (Kingdom of Greece) Greece
- Branch: Hellenic Army
- Service years: 1878–1924
- Rank: Major General
- Commands: 1st Infantry Regiment; 3rd Infantry Regiment; Serres Division
- Wars: Unfortunate War; Second Balkan War; World War 1

Nikolaos Christodoulou (Greek: Νικόλαος Χριστοδούλου; 1863 – c. 1924) was a Greek infantry officer who rose to the rank of Major General.

== Biography ==
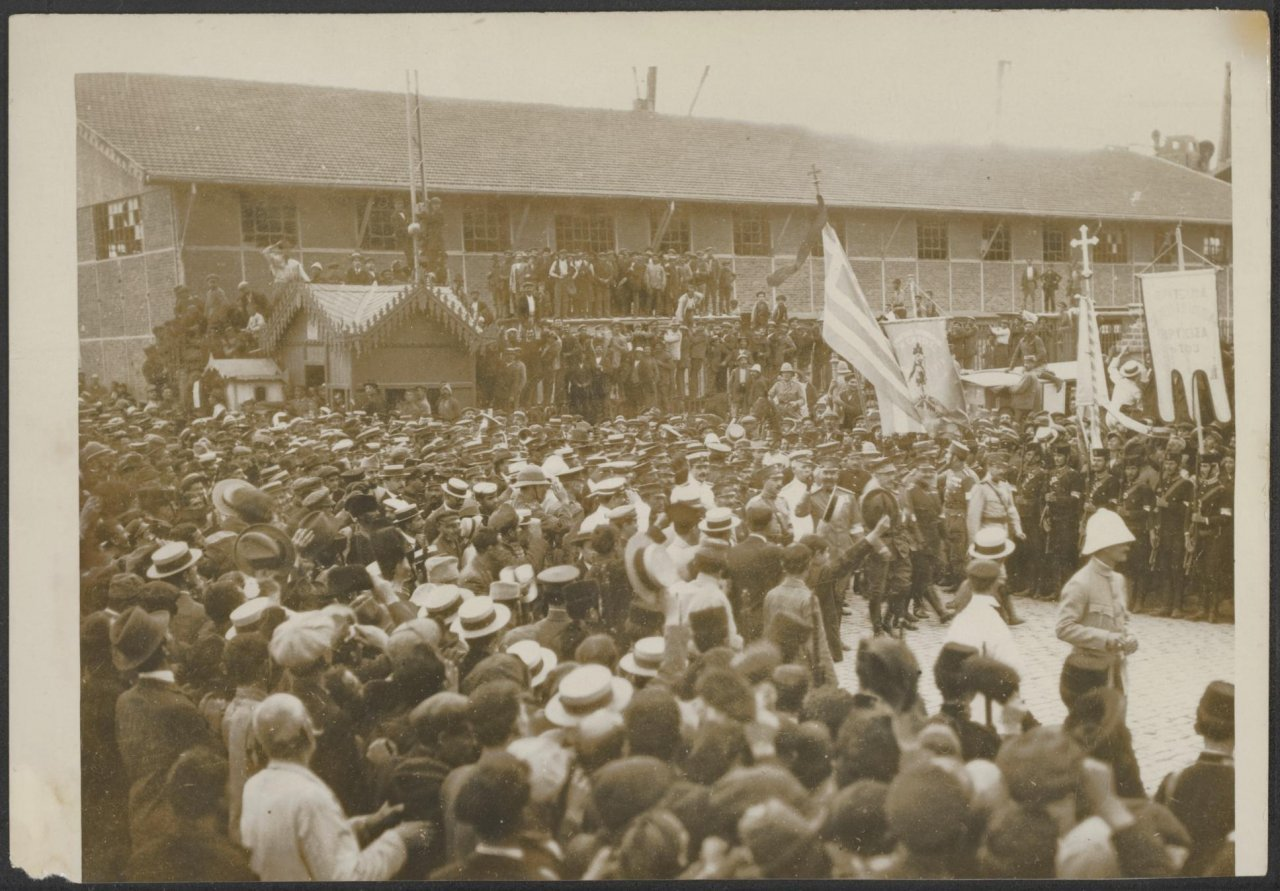
Christodoulou with his men during their arrival in Thessaloniki c. 1916

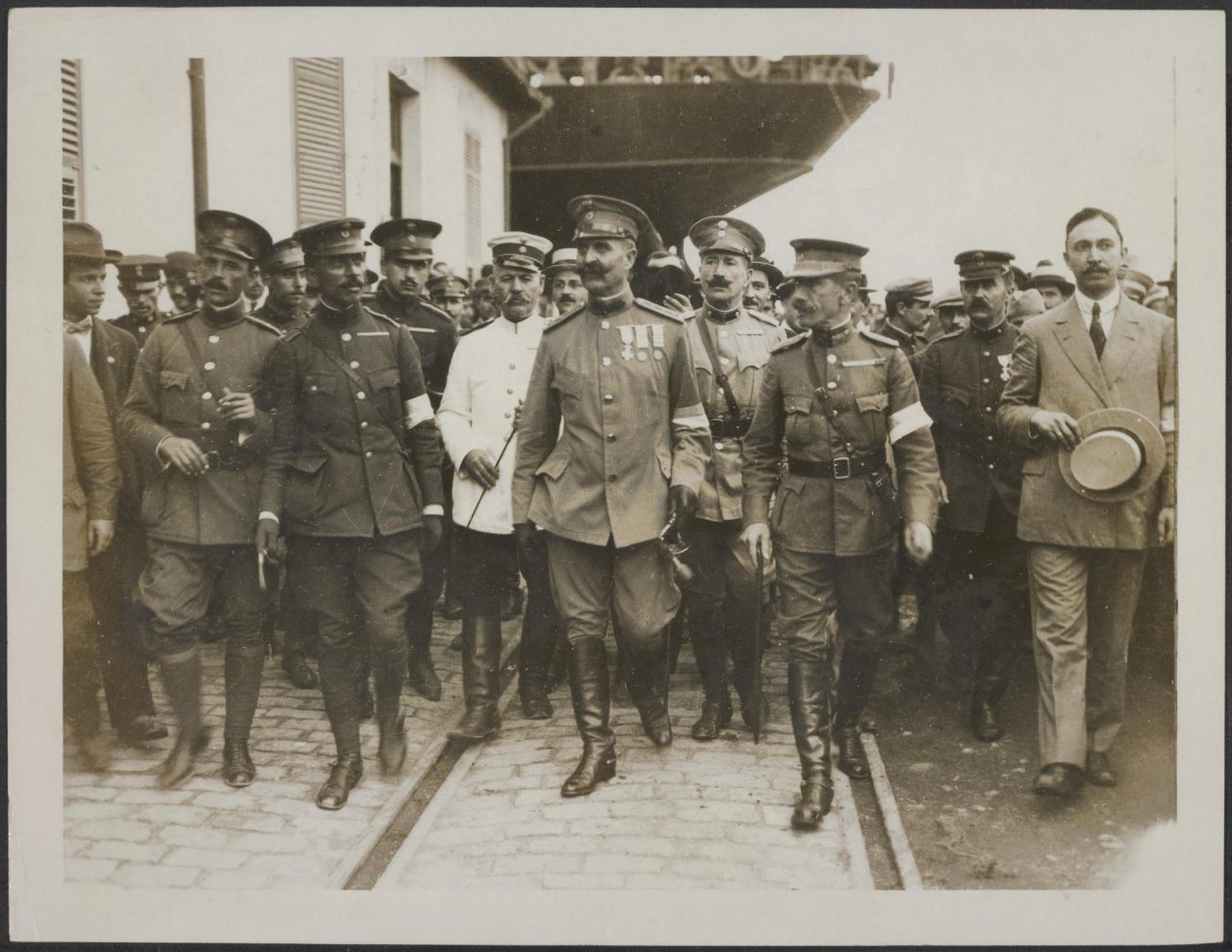
Christodoulou welcomed by Zymvrakakis in Thessaloniki

Christodoulou was born on 18 July 1863 in Chalcis. He enlisted in the Hellenic Army on 14 July 1878. By 1897, he was an officer in the 2nd Infantry Regiment, and fought in the Unfortunate War.

In the Balkan Wars of 1912–13 he initially served as battalion commander in the 3rd Infantry Regiment. On 20 June 1913 and until the Battle of Kresna Gorge he assumed command of the 1st Infantry Regiment following the death of the latter's commander, Col. F. Dialetis. He then returned to command his battalion for a few days, before assuming command of the entire 3rd Regiment, which he led during the last days of the Second Balkan War.

In 1916, following the Bulgarian invasion of eastern Macedonia, he did not obey orders from Athens to surrender and joined with his men the "National Defence" in Thessaloniki and assumed command of the Serres Division, which he led to the front near Gevgeli in December 1916. He continued to command the division until 1918, when he was replaced due to illness. He retired on 24 April 1924.
