= Serres Division =

Military unit of the Hellenic Army during WW1

Serres Division Μεραρχία Σερρῶν
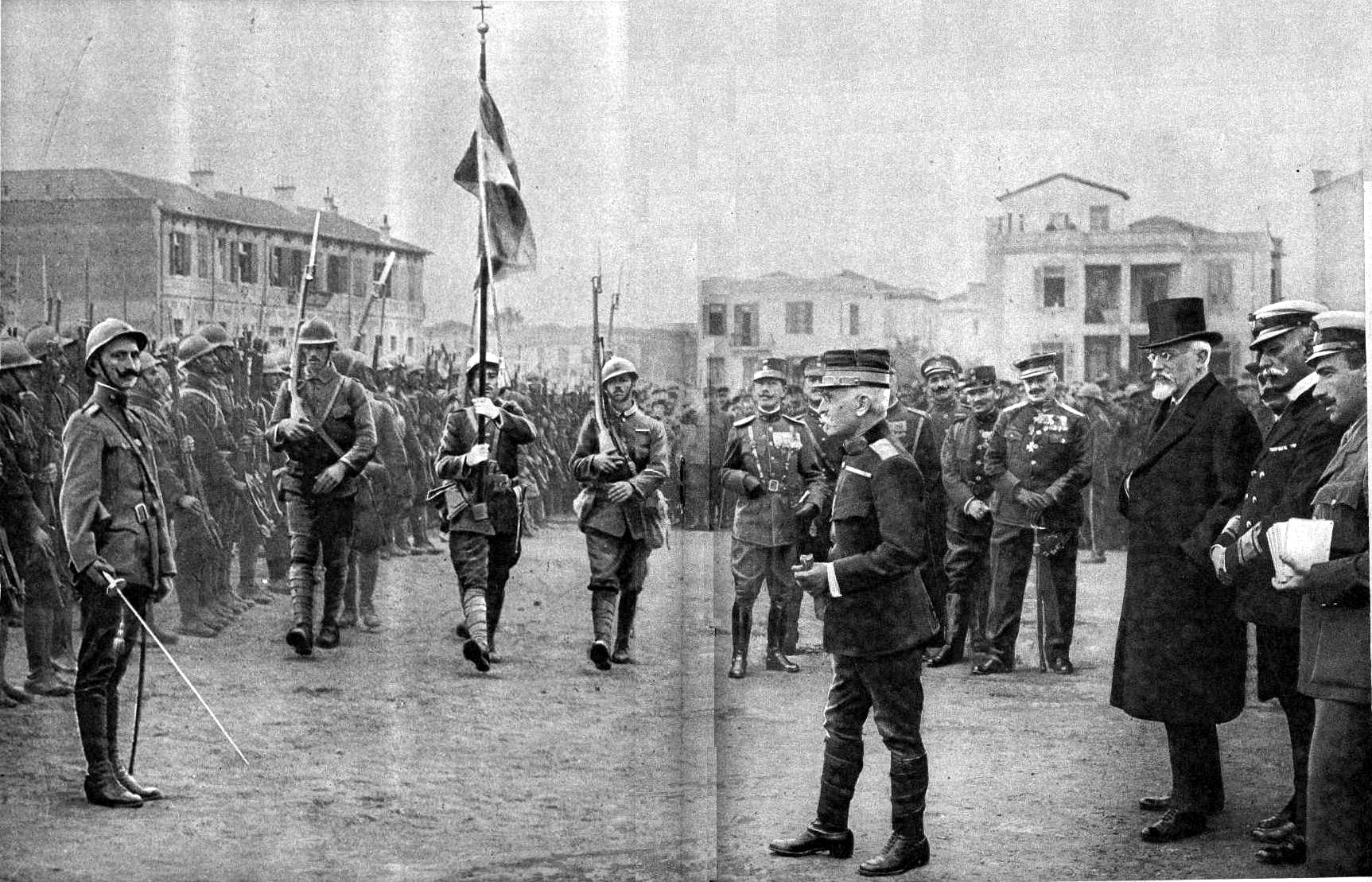
- Regimental war flag presentation to the Serres Division, December 1916, in the presence of the "Triumvirate" of the National Defence government (Prime Minister Eleftherios Venizelos, Lt. General Panagiotis Danglis, Admiral Pavlos Kountouriotis).
- Active: September 1916 – November 1920
- Country: Greece
- Allegiance: Provisional Government of National Defence (1916-17); Kingdom of Greece (1917-20)
- Branch: National Defence Army Corps (1916-17); Hellenic Army (1917-20)
- Type: infantry
- Size: Division
- Garrison/HQ: Serres, Macedonia, Greece
- Engagements: World War I: Macedonian front; Battle of Skra-di-Legen; Battle of Doiran; Operations in Western Thrace

Commanders
- Commander: Nikolaos Christodoulou; Epameinondas Zymvrakakis

The Serres Division (Greek: Μεραρχία Σερρῶν, romanized: Merarchia Serrōn) was an infantry division of Hellenic Army in World War I and the annexation of Western Thrace.

== Establishment ==
The division began being raised in September 1916 by the Provisional Government of National Defence, as part of its efforts to raise its own army for service alongside the Allies on the Macedonian front. These efforts entailed the establishment of four infantry divisions to be recruited in the areas controlled by the government (Crete, the Aegean islands, and Macedonia).

The Serres Division (Μεραρχία Σερρῶν), under Colonel Nikolaos Christodoulou, was the first division to be formed, as it could draw on the limited forces already available to the Provisional Government: the remnants of the disbanded IV Army Corps who had fled the Bulgarian advance and the Corps' capitulation to Thasos. These were c. 2,500 officers and men from the 6th Infantry Division's 17th and 18th infantry regiments and the 6th Mountain Artillery Battalion; 7th Infantry Division's 2/21 Cretan Regiment, and IV Corps' 7th Field Artillery Regiment. The division's manpower was completed by volunteers, both from within Greece and from Greek communities abroad (Constantinople, Asia Minor, Thrace, and the Dodecanese), as well as recruits mobilized—sometimes by force—by the Provisional Government.

== Macedonian front, 1916–1918 ==
The 1st Serres Regiment (1ο Σύνταγμα Σερρῶν) under Major Georgios Mavroudis was formed from the 17th and 2/21 Regiment, as well as the depot of the 9th Infantry Division. On 24–28 November, it assembled under French command at Boymitsa. On 1 December, two of its battalions assumed a front sector at Maya Dag. The 2nd Serres Regiment (2ο Σύνταγμα Σερρῶν) under Major Charalambos Tseroulis formed two of its battalions from the 18th Regiment's men, as well as taking over the "National Defence Battalion" (Τάγμα Ἐθνικῆς Ἀμύνης) that had already been deployed on the front in the Strymon River sector. The rest of the regiment also went to the same sector, under British command. However, after an attack by its 1st Battalion in the Kesislik area resulted heavy casualties (13 dead, 104 wounded), the entire regiment was withdrawn from the front and sent to the Maya Dag area; numerous desertions occurred at that time. The 3rd Serres Regiment (3ο Σύνταγμα Σερρῶν) was formed by one battalion from the 2/21 Regiment, one battalion of Cretan volunteers, and one battalion of volunteers from Samos and Asia Minor. Its formation was delayed, and it was not until the end of the year that the entire division assembled to the south of Boymitsa.

== Sources ==
- Επίτομη ιστορία της συμμετοχής του Ελληνικού Στρατού στον Πρώτο Παγκόσμιο Πόλεμο 1914 - 1918 [Concise History of the Hellenic Army's Participation in the First World War 1914–1918] (in Greek). Athens: Hellenic Army History Directorate. 1993.
