= Provisional Government of National Defence =

1916–17 government in northern Greece in WWI

Provisional Government of National Defence State of Thessaloniki Προσωρινή Κυβέρνηση Εθνικής Αμύνης Κράτος της Θεσσαλονίκης
- 1916–1917
- Flag

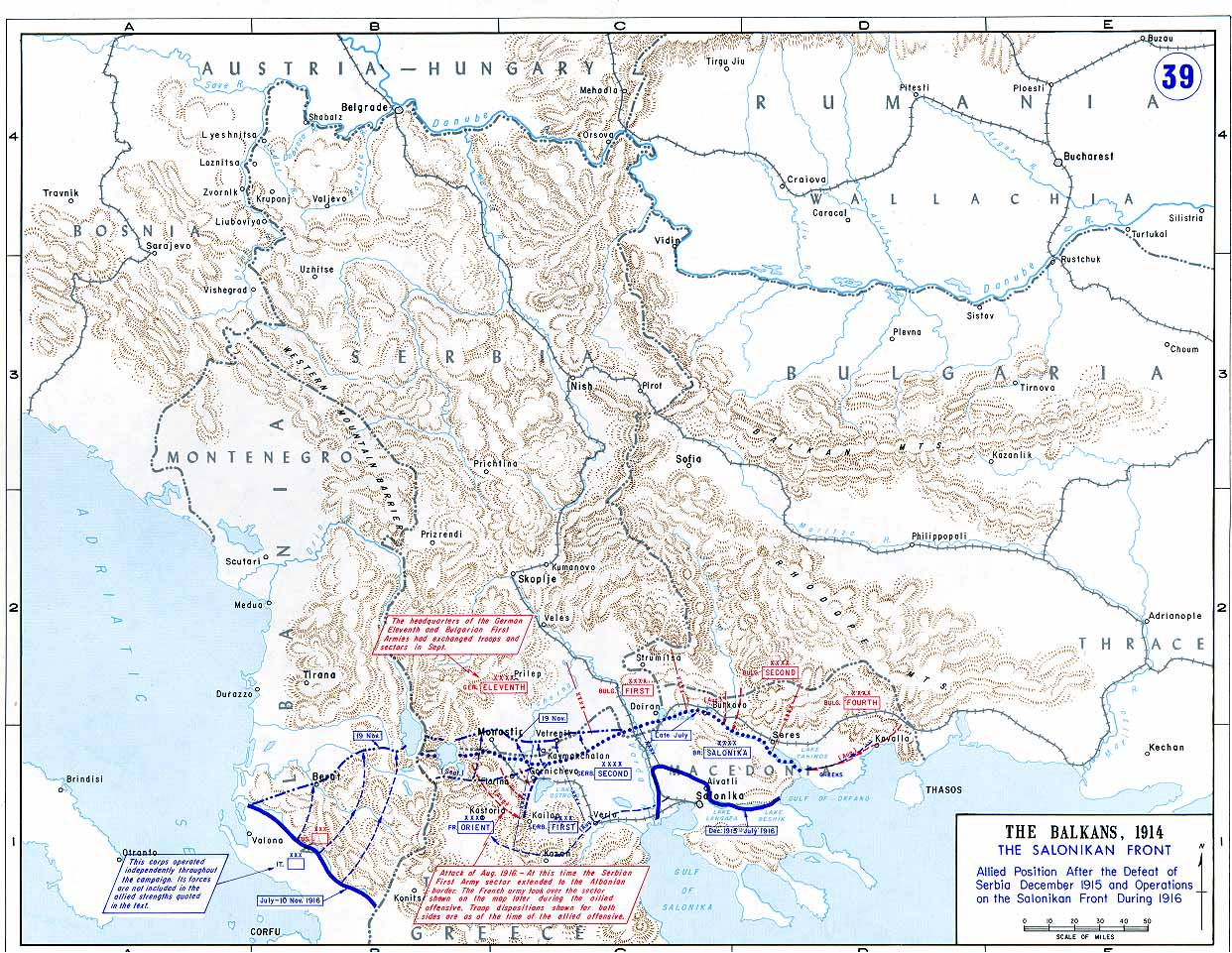
- Status: Venizelist-dominated government (recognized by the Triple Entente in December 1916 as the lawful Greek government)
- Capital: Thessaloniki
- Common languages: Greek language
- Religion: Greek Orthodox
- Government: Provisional Venizelist state
- Prime Minister
  - 1916-1917: Eleftherios Venizelos
- Triumvirate of National Defence
  - 1916-1917: Eleftherios Venizelos; Pavlos Kountouriotis; Panagiotis Danglis
- Historical era: World War I National Schism
  - National Defence coup d'état: 17 August 1916
  - Abdication of Constantine I: 29 May 1917
- Currency: Greek drachma (₯); French franc
Preceded by	Succeeded by
Kingdom of Greece	Kingdom of Greece

The Provisional Government of National Defence (Greek: Προσωρινή Κυβέρνηση Εθνικής Αμύνης, romanized: 'Prosoriní Kyvérnisi Ethnikís Amýnis), also known as the State of Thessaloniki (Κράτος της Θεσσαλονίκης), was a parallel administration, set up in the city of Thessaloniki by former Prime Minister Eleftherios Venizelos and his supporters during World War I, in opposition and rivalry to the official royal government in Athens.

The establishment of this second Greek state had its origins in the debate over Greece's entry into the war on behalf of the Entente, as advocated by Venizelos, or a Germanophile neutrality as preferred by King Constantine I. This dissension soon began to divide Greek society around the two leaders, beginning the so-called "National Schism". In 17 August 1916, as parts of eastern Macedonia were not defended by the royal government against a Bulgarian invasion, Venizelist officers of the Hellenic Army launched an Entente-supported coup in Thessaloniki. After a brief hesitation, Venizelos and his principal supporters joined the uprising and began the establishment of a second Greek government in the north of the country, which entered the war on the side of the Entente. The National Defence government endured until 29 May 1917, when the Entente powers forced Constantine I to abdicate, and allowed Venizelos to return to Athens as Prime Minister of a unified country. Nevertheless, the establishment of the National Defence government deepened the rift of the National Schism, which would plague Greek political life for over a generation, and contribute to the Asia Minor Catastrophe.

== Background: Greece 1914–1916 ==
Greece had emerged victorious from the 1912-1913 Balkan Wars, with her territory almost doubled, but found itself in a difficult international situation. The status of the Greek-occupied eastern Aegean islands was left undetermined, and the Ottoman Empire continued to claim them, leading to a naval arms race and mass expulsions of ethnic Greeks from Anatolia. In the north, Bulgaria, defeated in the Second Balkan War, harbored revanchist plans against Greece and Serbia. The two countries were bound by a treaty of alliance which promised military assistance in case of a Bulgarian attack, but in August 1914, the danger would emerge from a different quarter altogether: the Assassination of Archduke Franz Ferdinand led to the declaration of war by Austria-Hungary on Serbia and the outbreak of the First World War.

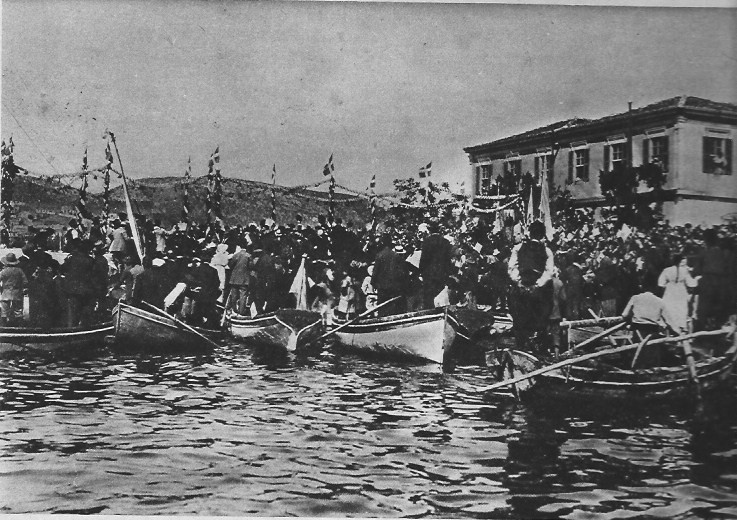
Arrival of Venizelos in Mytilini, June 1916

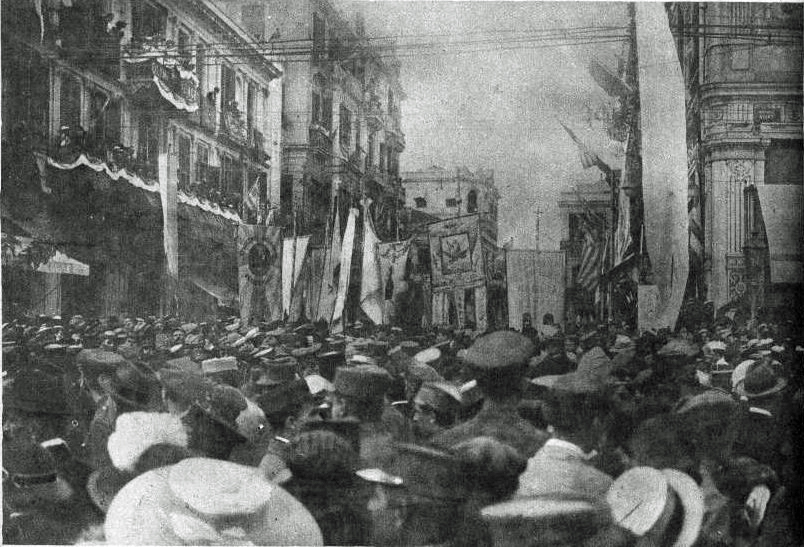
Proclamation of the Venizelist government in Thessaloniki, September 1916

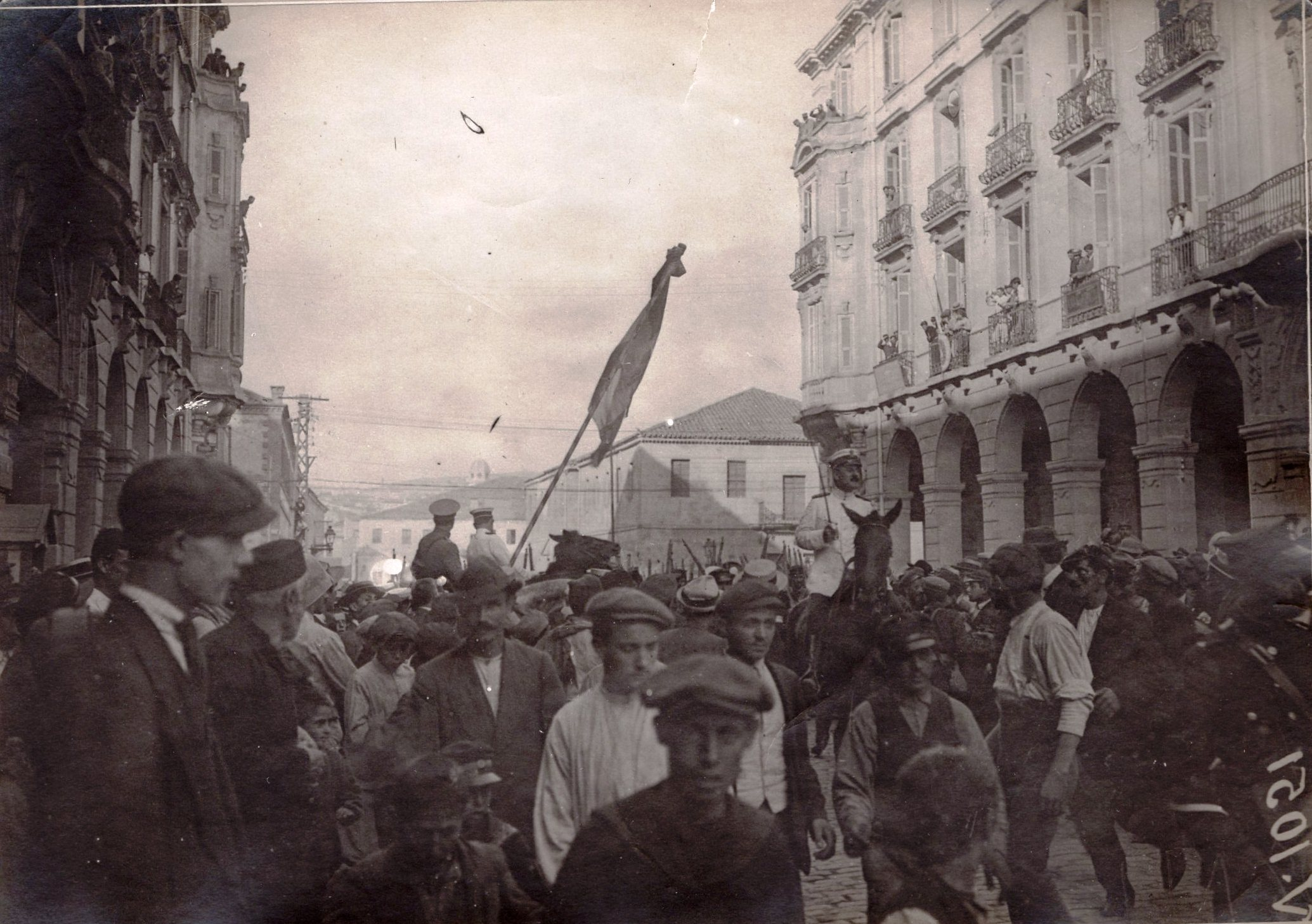
Demonstration

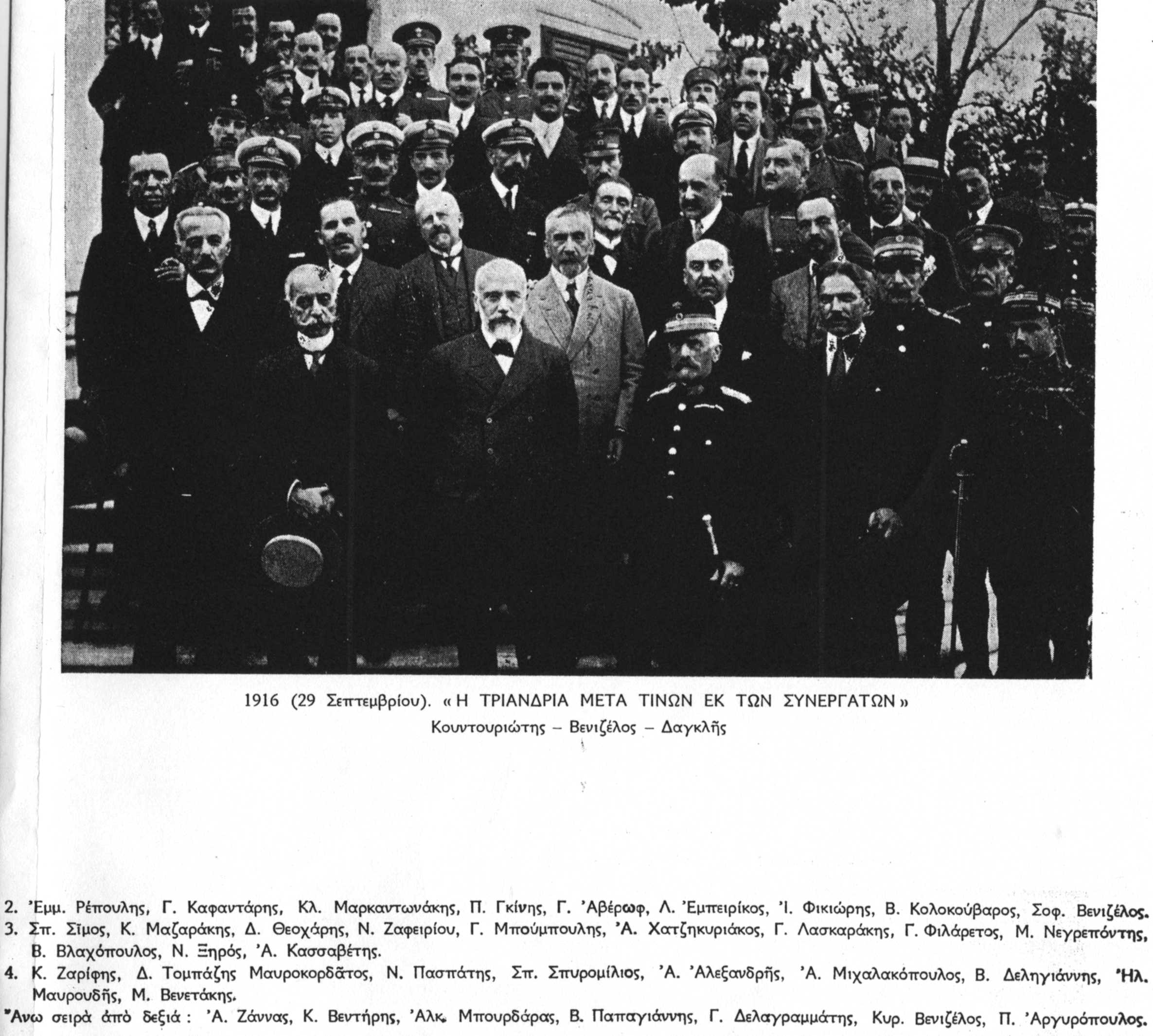
The National Defence government: the Triumvirate with collaborators on 29 September 1916 (O.S.)

Greece, like Bulgaria, initially maintained neutrality, but as the war continued, both warring camps began wooing the two countries. At this point the first rifts appeared among the Greek leadership: Prime Minister Eleftherios Venizelos, at the helm since 1910 of a modernising government looking towards the British and French models, supported entry in the war on the side of the Entente, while King Constantine I, who had been educated in Germany, married to Kaiser Wilhelm II's sister and a deep admirer of Prussian militarism, anticipated a German victory. Aware that Greece was vulnerable to the British Fleet, he advocated a course of neutrality.

In early 1915 the British offered Greece "territorial concessions in Asia Minor" if it would participate in the upcoming Gallipoli Campaign. Venizelos supported this idea, but run into the opposition from the King and his military advisors. As a result, Venizelos submitted his resignation on 6 March [O.S. 21 February] 1915, and was replaced by a royalist-leaning government led by Dimitrios Gounaris. The Liberal Party won the subsequent May 1915 elections and Venizelos again formed a government on 23 August [O.S. 10 August] 1915. When Bulgaria mobilized against Serbia in September 1915, Venizelos ordered a Greek counter-mobilization and called upon the Anglo-French to establish themselves in Thessaloniki (then widely known as Salonica) as to aid Serbia. Indeed, the Allies began landing on 22 September 1915 and started entrenching themselves at the Salonica camp. (Note: The entrenched camp of Salonica became the location of present-day Zeitenlik Allied military cemetery and memorial park.) The King unconstitutionally dismissed Venizelos and the parliament, making the breach between the two men and their followers irreparable. The Liberals boycotted the December 1915 elections. In the same month, the French, with the permission of Venizelos, occupied Corfu, where the remains of the Serbian Army were gathered before being sent to Thessaloniki. In view of these events, a clandestine "Revolutionary Committee of National Defence" was formed in Thessaloniki by a group of prominent Liberals and representatives of all over Macedonia, including Konstantinos Angelakis (mayor of Thessaloniki), Alexandros Zannas and Periklis A. Argyropoulos (representatives of Thessaloniki), Dimitrios Dingas and Dimitrios Pazis (representatives of Serres), Nikolaos Manos (representative of Kozani), Panayiotis Grekos (representative of Florina), Georgios Zervos (representative of Drama), Major General Emmanouil Zymvrakakis and others. The group acknowledged Venizelos as its leader, and began approaching officers of the Army and the Cretan Gendarmerie.

During the following year, Greece's official governments were hard-pressed to maintain the country's neutrality. The final straw came when, on 25 May [O.S. 12 May] 1916, the Athens government, succumbing to German pressure, ordered the surrender of the vital Rupel Fortress to the Germans and their Bulgarian Allies. In response, on 3 June [O.S. 21 May] 1916, the pro-Entente Venizelists imposed martial law, effectively abolishing royal sovereignty in all of northern Greece. On 18 August [O.S. 3 August], the Bulgarian invasion of eastern Macedonia commenced, facing little resistance, since the Athens government refused to condone any firm action. As a result, more than 6000 men of IV Corps surrendered to the Germans on 26 August [O.S. 13 August] and were deported to Görlitz in Germany. This surrender of hard-won territories with only token resistance, outraged most Greeks. At the same time, the establishment of the exiled Serbian King and his government in Thessaloniki in April, the presence of 120,000 Serbian troops in the Macedonian Front, accompanied by threats from the Entente that he would install a Serbian prefect in the city, raised fears that the city would be handed over to the Serbians.

== Uprising in Thessaloniki ==
Incensed by the successive humiliations and the Bulgarian advance in Macedonia, several Greek officers had flocked to Thessaloniki and volunteered to raise troops and join the Allies. The local Allied commander-in-chief, Maurice Sarrail, welcomed their initiatives, but little headway was made due to the opposition of the Greek government. On 16/29 August, the Lt. Colonel Konstantinos Mazarakis-Ainian tried to seize control of the 11th Infantry Division's mountain artillery battalion, and lead it to the front. This was opposed by Colonel Nikolaos Trikoupis, the chief of staff and acting commander of III Army Corps, who sent two companies to the artillery barracks at Mikro Karabournou that forced Mazarakis to abandon his attempt and withdraw from the barracks.

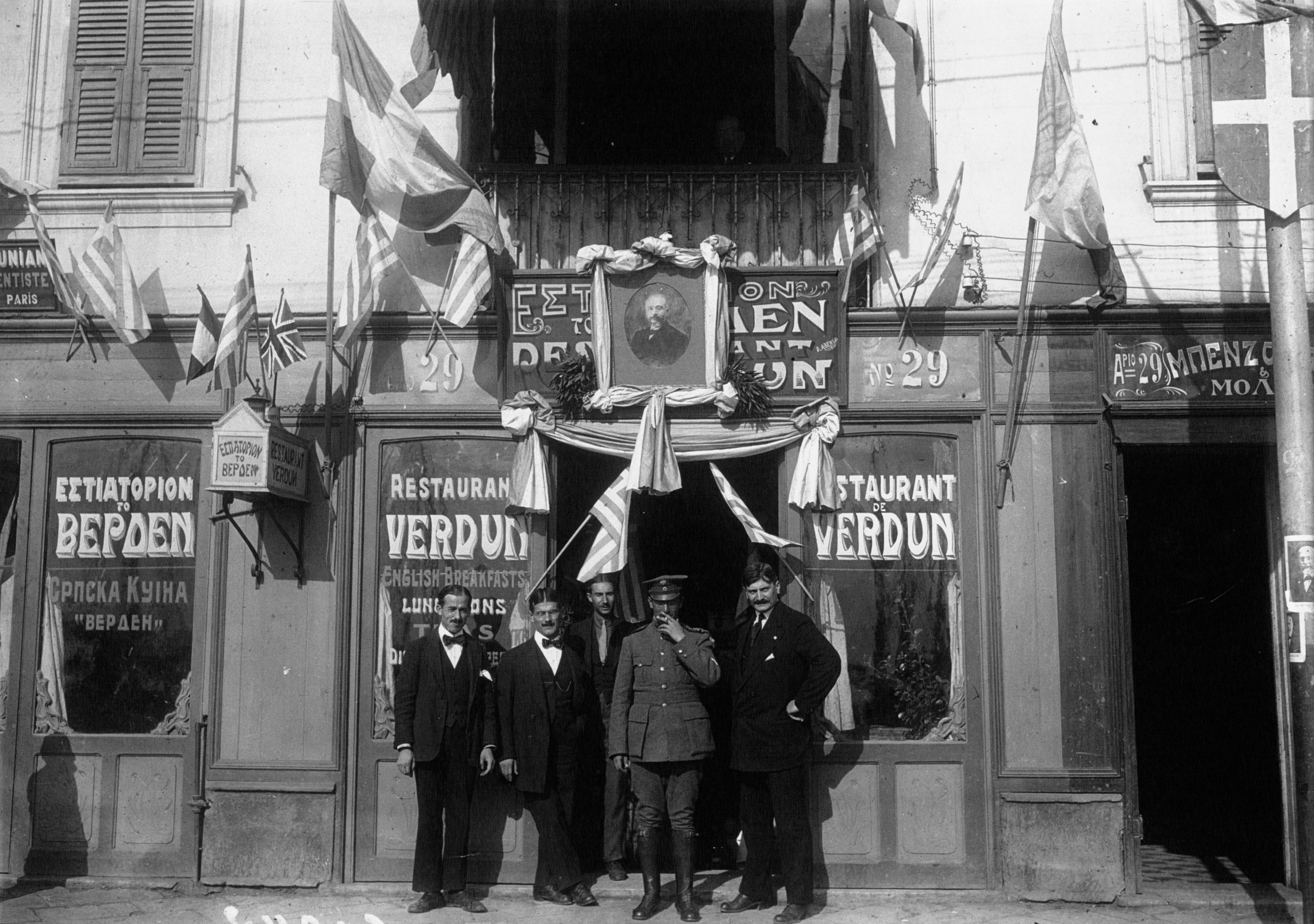
Restaurant "Verdun" in Thessaloniki, decorated in support of Venizelos and the National Defence regime, 1916.

This incident sparked the flame of a wider uprising on the next day, 30 August [O.S. 17 August], by the city's pro-Venizelist officers. Under the command of Lt. Colonel Epameinondas Zymvrakakis, about 600 men of the Cretan Gendarmerie with three volunteer companies under Major Neokosmos Grigoriadis and thirty other officers blockaded the headquarters of III Corps. When a company under Colonel Vagias tried to break through the blockade, shots were fired that killed two gendarmes and wounded three others. In response, the Cretans fired back, killing or wounding three or four soldiers. The firefight was stopped by the intervention of French officers. Sarrail arrived on the scene soon after, and commanded all Greek officers who would not join the newly formed "National Defence Committee" uprising to be shipped to southern Greece. The loyalist troops were disarmed and interned in the hopes that they would join the uprising, but in the event most of them refused and had to be sent to southern Greece as well.

Individual officers from across northern Greece began to flock to Thessaloniki, and on 15 September [O.S. 2 September], the "National Defence" received its first substantial reinforcement, as Colonel Nikolaos Christodoulou arrived in the city with the remnants of IV Corps that had refused to surrender and instead withdrawn via Kavala and Samothrace. Already on 21 September [O.S. 8 September], the volunteers under Major Grigoriadis formed the 1st Battalion of the "Army of National Defence", and departed for the front lines along the Strymon river.

== Establishment of the State of National Defence ==
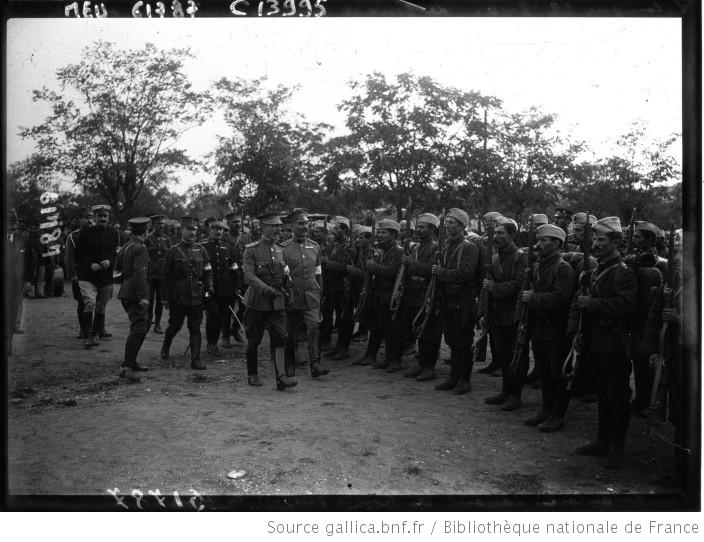
Officers Zymvrakakis and Christodoulou inspect troops

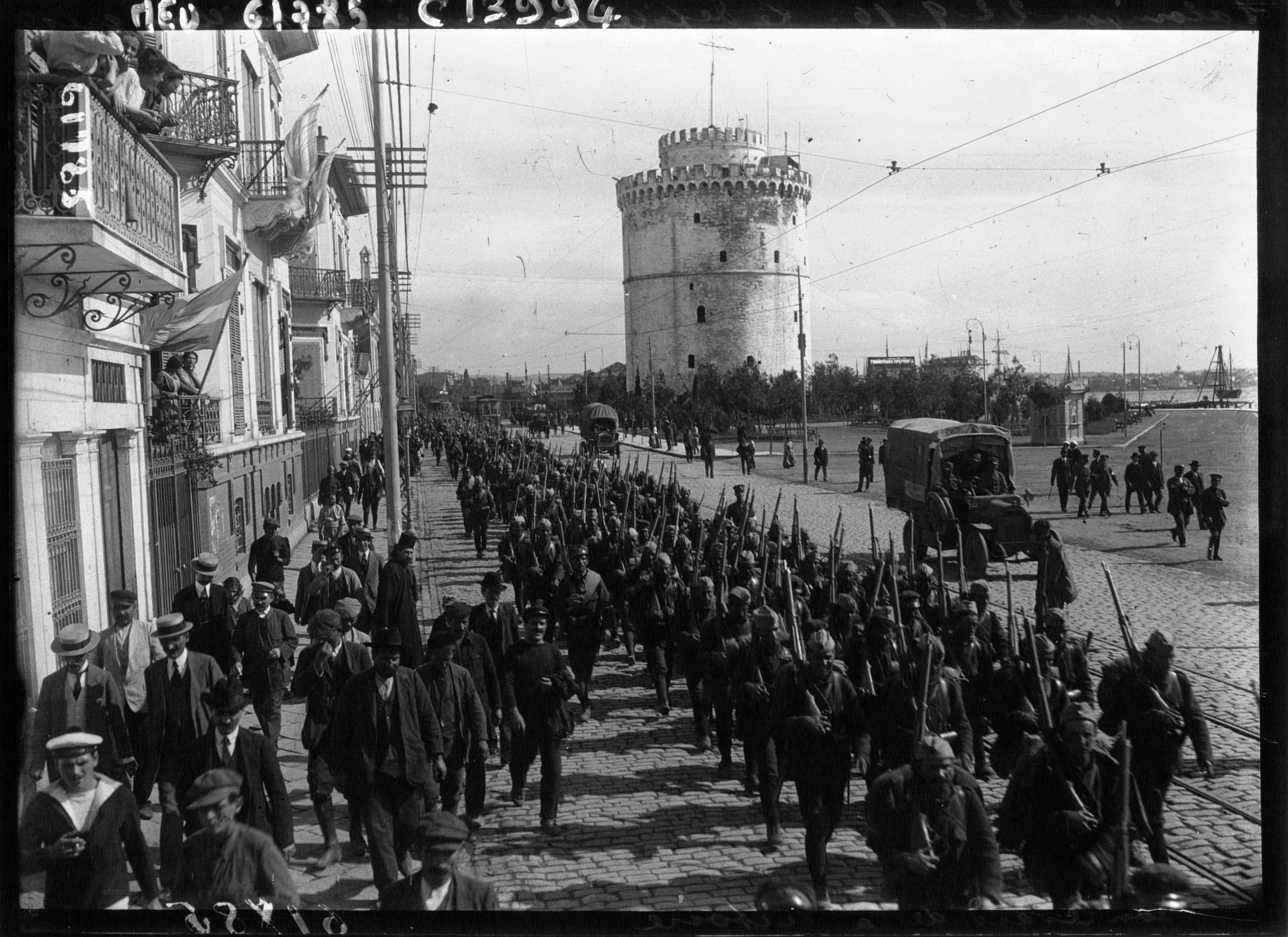
The 1st Battalion of the Army of National Defence marches before the White Tower on its way to the front.

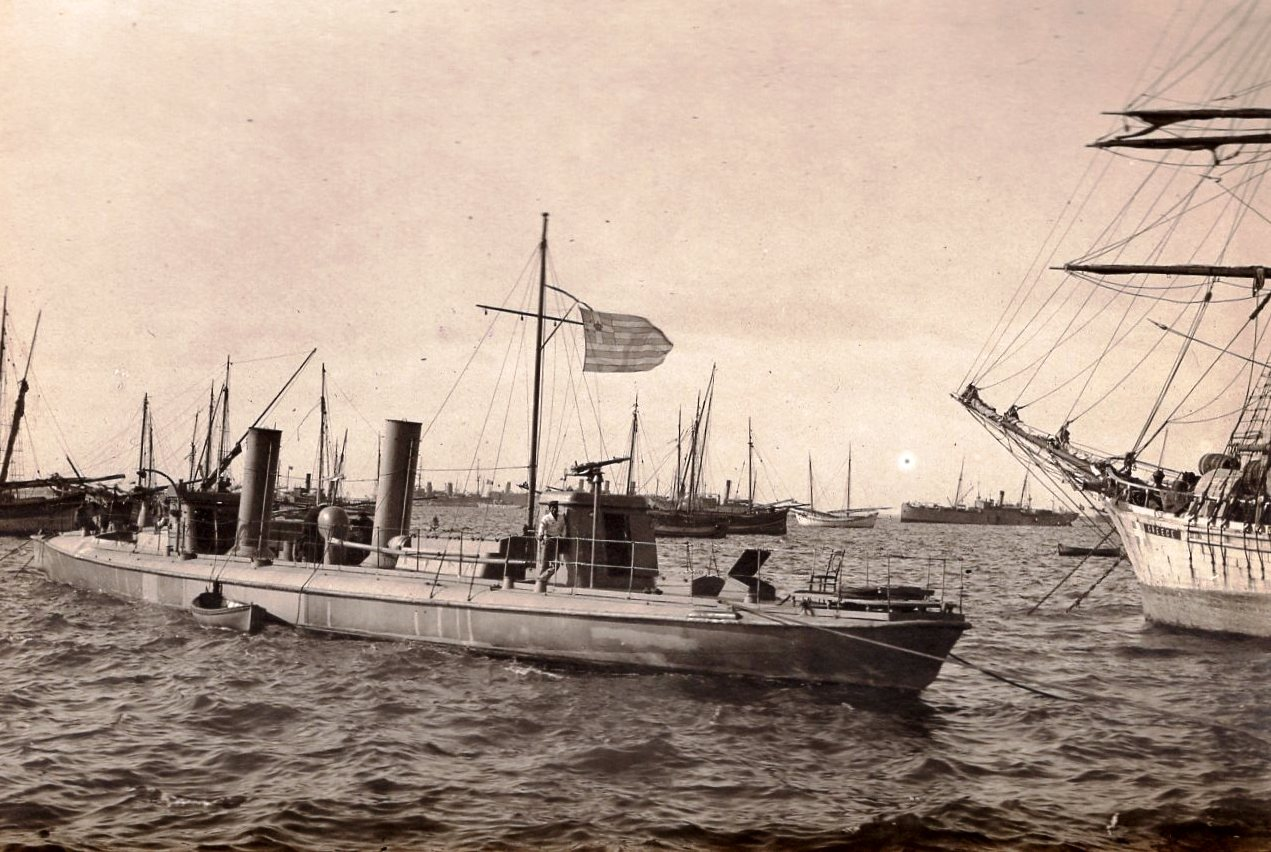
A Greek torpado boat at the port

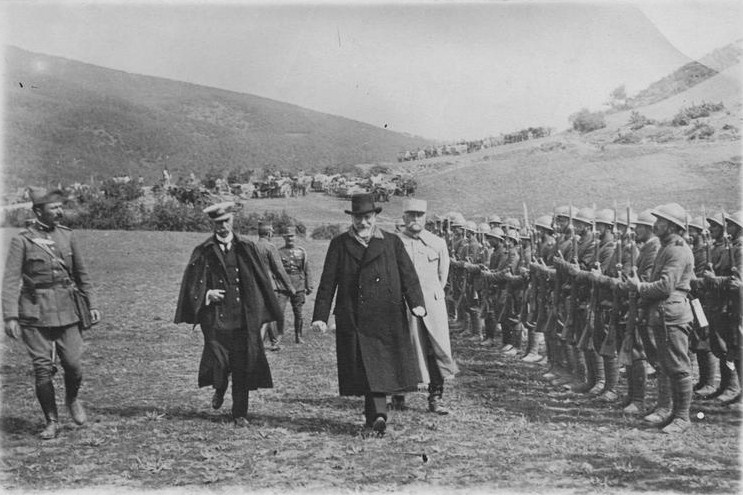
Venizelos inspects Greek troops on the Macedonian front, accompanied by Admiral Kountouriotis and General Sarrail.

Venizelos himself with his closest aides left Athens on 12/25 September, initially for his home island of Crete, and from there via Chios and Lesbos to Thessaloniki, where he arrived on 24 September/7 October. Four days later, on 28 September/11 October, he formed a provisional government under the supreme leadership of a triumvirate comprising himself, General Panagiotis Danglis and Admiral Pavlos Kountouriotis (the "Triumvirate of National Defence", Τριανδρία της Εθνικής Αμύνης).

On 29 September/12 October, Maj Gen Emmanouil Zymvrakakis was appointed Army Minister (replaced on December 6 by Maj Gen Konstantinos Miliotis-Komninos) and on October 3 Nikolaos Politis was appointed Foreign Minister. On 6 October other ministries, euphemistically called "General Directorates" were established:

- Themistoklis Sophoulis, Interior Minister
- Miltiadis Negrepontis, Finance Minister
- Thalis Koutoupis, Minister of National Economy
- Dimitrios Dingas, Justice Minister
- Georgios Averof, Education Minister
- Alexandros Kassavetis, Transport Minister
- Leonidas Embeirikos, Minister for Supply and Food Distribution
- Spyridon Simos, Minister for the Refugees
- Andreas Michalakopoulos, Minister for Public Estates and Resettlement

The first tasks of the new government were the establishment of an "Army of National Defence" to fight alongside the Allies, and the consolidation of its rule in as much of Greece as possible. The Provisional Government declared war on the Central Powers on 24 November 1916, and set out to recruit divisions for the Macedonian Front, something which was achieved with speed and often ruthlessness. Despite calls by some officers to abolish the monarchy and declare a Republic, Venizelos chose a more moderate path. He had declared: "we are not against the King, but against the Bulgarians".

The State of National Defence established control in Greek Macedonia, Crete and the northern Aegean islands; lands that were just recently liberated during the Balkan Wars. The reluctant and uneasy coexistence of the two Greek states was not destined to last, as the Noemvriana riots against Venizelists in Athens clearly illustrated that a rapprochement was now impossible. Early in 1917, the Venizelist state took also control of Thessaly, after clashes against the royal army of Constantine.

The division of the country lasted for 9 months. On 15 June 1917 an Allied ultimatum forced King Constantine to abdicate in favour of his second-born son, Alexander, and, with the rest of his family, leave the country for Switzerland. Venizelos returned to Athens, as head of a superficially reunified Greece, and led it to victory alongside the Allies in World War I, but also in its entanglement in the subsequent Asia Minor Campaign. As such, the immediate aims of the "National Defence" were met. But the revolution was also an expression of the wide rift between the quasi-Republican, progressive Venizelists and the conservative Royalists/Anti-Venizelists, and its outbreak marks also the beginning of the Greek National Schism which would leave a troublesome legacy to the country, as it continued in various forms up to the 1970s.

== In popular culture ==
A popular song of the era celebrating the movement was performed by the musical Estudiantina of Smyrna named Tis aminis ta pedià (the lads of the Defence) or the Macedon.

The song was performed also in the film Rebetiko of Costas Ferris in orchestration of Stavros Xarchakos.
