= Epameinondas Zymvrakakis =

Lieutenant General Epameinondas Zymvrakakis
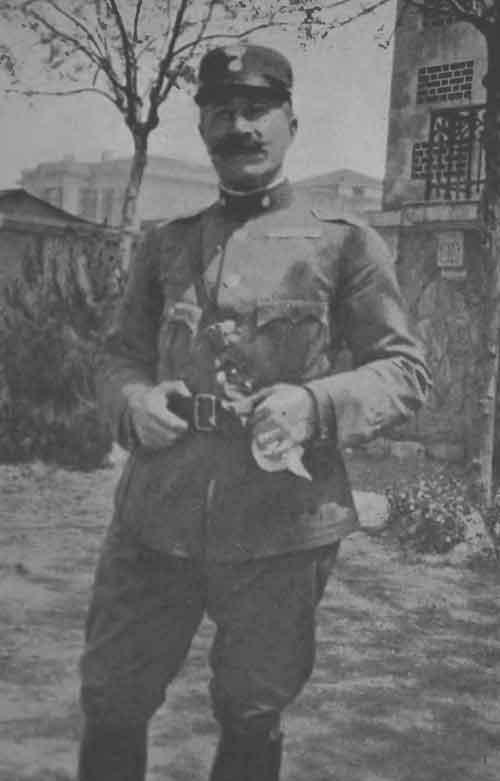
- Colonel Epaminontas Zimvrakakis in 1917
- Born: 1863
- Died: 1922 (aged 58–59)
- Military career
- Allegiance: Greece

Epameinondas Zymbrakakis or Pamikos Zymbrakakis (Nafplio, 1863 – 1922) was a Greek Lieutenant General who fought in World War I.

== Biography ==
He was the son of the military, politician and Army minister Charalambos Zymbrakakis (1812-1880). His elder brother was Emmanouil Zymvrakakis, who also became a Lieutenant General in World War I. Epameinondas enlisted as a volunteer in the army in 1882 and studied at the School of Non-Commissioned Officers, from which he left in 1888 as a second lieutenant. He was sent to France to complete his studies. During the Cretan Revolt (1897–1898), he participated as a volunteer.

In 1909 Epameinondas Zymbrakakis was one of the main inspirers and creators of the Goudi coup, as a member of the steering committee of the Military Association. Also in 1916, when the Provisional Government of National Defence was proclaimed in Thessaloniki by Eleftherios Venizelos, he was one of the first to support it. After Greece had joined the allies in 1917, he participated at the head of the Serres Division in all the military operations of the Entente, that took place in Macedonia.

He died in 1922 with the rank of Lieutenant General.

== Sources ==
- "Newer Encyclopaedic Dictionary of Helios" vol.8th, p. 771.
- Pericles I. Argyropoulos "Memories" - Athens 1996, p. 66.
