= 1922 Constantinople crisis =

Proposed Greek occupation of Constantinople in 1922

- Part of the Greco-Turkish War (1919–1922) and the Occupation of Constantinople
- General Georgios Hatzianestis inspecting his troops
Date	27 July – 3 August 1922
Location	Eastern Thrace and Constantinople, Ottoman Empire
Result	Plan abandoned

Belligerents
Kingdom of Greece	United Kingdom; France; Kingdom of Italy

Commanders and leaders
Constantine I of Greece; Georgios Hatzianestis; Nikolaos Theotokis	Charles Harington; Charles Antoine Charpy; Ernesto Mombelli

Strength
c. 50,000 troops	c. 4,500 infantry 1 cavalry regiment and 2 squadrons

The 1922 Constantinople crisis was a diplomatic and military confrontation between Greece and Britain, France and Italy in July–August 1922, caused by Greek preparations to occupy Constantinople during the Greco-Turkish War (1919–1922).

In July 1922, the Greek government sought permission from the three great powers, Britain, France and Italy, to enter Constantinople, already under Allied occupation, hoping that control of the Ottoman capital would force the Turkish nationalists to accept a peace settlement. Greek troops were transferred to Eastern Thrace and concentrated near the Çatalca Line, west of the city. The operation was scheduled to begin on 29 July, with General Georgios Hatzianestis personally commanding the advance.

Britain, France and Italy opposed the operation and prepared to resist any Greek advance into their zone. After a short period of tension, the Greek government ordered the operation suspended, and an encrypted telegram carrying the suspension order reached Hatzianestis shortly before the scheduled advance. The Greek army did not enter Constantinople and the plan was abandoned.

== Background ==
The Greek offensive towards Ankara had ended with the Battle of the Sakarya in September 1921. After that, the two armies remained facing each other in Anatolia in a stalemate, while negotiations conducted by the Allied powers failed to bring the war to an end. The Greek government was also struggling to meet the cost of keeping its army in Asia Minor.

Under the Treaty of Sèvres of August 1920, Greece was to acquire most of Eastern Thrace, bringing its territory close to Constantinople. The city itself remained under Allied occupation, and the Straits were to be placed under international control. British, French and Italian forces controlled Constantinople and the surrounding neutral zone, placing any proposed Greek operation there in direct conflict with the powers whose support Greece still sought.

The government of Petros Protopapadakis considered an autonomous settlement in the Smyrna region and an advance on Constantinople as possible means of bringing the war to an end. The proposed occupation was intended to give Greece a negotiating advantage over the Turkish nationalists and pressure the Allies to secure peace.

== Preparations in Thrace ==
General Georgios Hatzianestis, commander-in-chief of the Army of Asia Minor in 1922.

General Georgios Hatzianestis took command of the Greek forces in Thrace in May 1922 and found them short of men and equipment. He proposed shortening the extensive Greek front in Anatolia and transferring troops to strengthen the Thracian army. After he succeeded Anastasios Papoulas as commander-in-chief in Asia Minor, senior officers including Konstantinos Pallis, Georgios Polymenakos and Georgios Kondylis disagreed with his handling of the army and resigned.

The Thracian army was redesignated as the IV Army Corps on 1/14 June 1922 and placed under the command of hte Army of Asia Minor. Major General Aristotelis Vlachopoulos assumed temporary command of the corps on 16/29 June and began reorganizing its forces. During June and July, the Thracian forces received another 162 officers, 25 military cadets, 140 military trainees, 6,082 enlisted men and 3,615 animals.

A royal war council held on 29 June/12 July considered an advance on Constantinople. On 10/23 July, Hatzianestis secretly returned to Athens for a meeting aboard the armoured cruiser Georgios Averof. The government and Hatzianestis decided to proceed with the operation, hoping to surprise Mustafa Kemal. Former prime minister Dimitrios Gounaris and War Minister Nikolaos Theotokis were also involved in the discussions.

Greek units were transferred from Anatolia to Eastern Thrace in July. The reinforcements included eleven infantry battalions, seven from the northern Anatolian front and four from the southern front. Their combined strength has been estimated by Stoukas, drawing on Ioannis Papafloratos, at no more than 7,000 men. Tsouknida, citing the newspaper Kosmos of 17/30 July 1922, instead gives a figure of 21,000 troops transferred from Anatolia to Thrace. Contemporary reports of the total forces assembled near Çatalca also varied, with one newspaper estimate putting 70,000 Greek troops on the front.

The reinforcements left the Greek forces in Thrace sufficiently strong to carry out the intended operation, although it was cancelled following Allied opposition. The troops transferred from the Anatolian front were not returned after the cancellation.

The advance was scheduled to begin at 4 a.m. on 16 July according to the Greek calendar then in use (29 July in the Gregorian calendar). Hatzianestis, then at Rodosto, was to direct the operation. The troop movements alarmed the Allied authorities in Constantinople, and on 28 July General Charles Harington warned that an unauthorized crossing of the neutral zone would be resisted.

== Crisis ==
=== Greek request ===
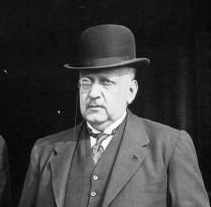
Foreign Minister Georgios Baltatzis, who submitted the Greek diplomatic notes to the Allied powers.

On 27 July, Foreign Minister Georgios Baltatzis presented a note to the Allied representatives in Athens. The government blamed Turkish resistance to the proposed peace settlement for the continuation of the war and said that direct action might be necessary to protect the Christians of Asia Minor, who were, by that point, actively facing genocide. It also expressed willingness to cooperate with the Allies in finding a settlement.

A second note, delivered on 29 July, requested Allied permission to occupy Constantinople, arguing that such a move would compel the Turkish nationalists to make peace. The note declared that only the occupation of Constantinople by the Greek army could compel a peace agreement. The government promised to await the Allied reply before taking action.

In a letter to Theotokis, Hatzianestis argued that an occupation would strengthen Greece's position in prospective peace negotiations at Beykoz, on the Bosporus. He proposed keeping the Greek army as close to Constantinople as possible if the advance could not be carried out. Hatzianestis subsequently wrote to Harington, asserting that Constantinople was serving as a supply centre for the Turkish nationalist army.

France, turning against its former ally, bitterly opposed Greece's proposal. At the French Foreign Ministry, political director Emmanuel Peretti della Rocca informed the Greek chargé d'affaires of France's opposition. On 31 July, the French representative in Athens informed the Greek government that Allied forces would prevent any advance against the city. On the same day, in London, Prime Minister David Lloyd George told the House of Commons that Greece had been warned of the serious consequences of crossing the neutral zone. He also reported Baltatzis's assurances that Greek troops would not advance without Allied permission.

Horace Rumbold, the British High Commissioner in Constantinople, considered the threat "50% bluff and 50% serious". Nevertheless, British opinion on Greek control of the city was divided. In an August 1921 memorandum, Admiral John de Robeck had opposed allowing Greece to establish itself in Constantinople and the Straits, arguing that Greece lacked the resources to maintain control of the city and that Soviet Russia would not tolerate Greek control over the Black Sea's exit outlet. On the other hand, Arthur Balfour suggested that a temporary Greek presence might suit British interests if British garrisons were eventually reduced. British chargé d'affaires F. O. Lindley left Athens to advocate Greece's cause in London, believing that British opposition was largely because of France's intransigence.

=== Allied response ===
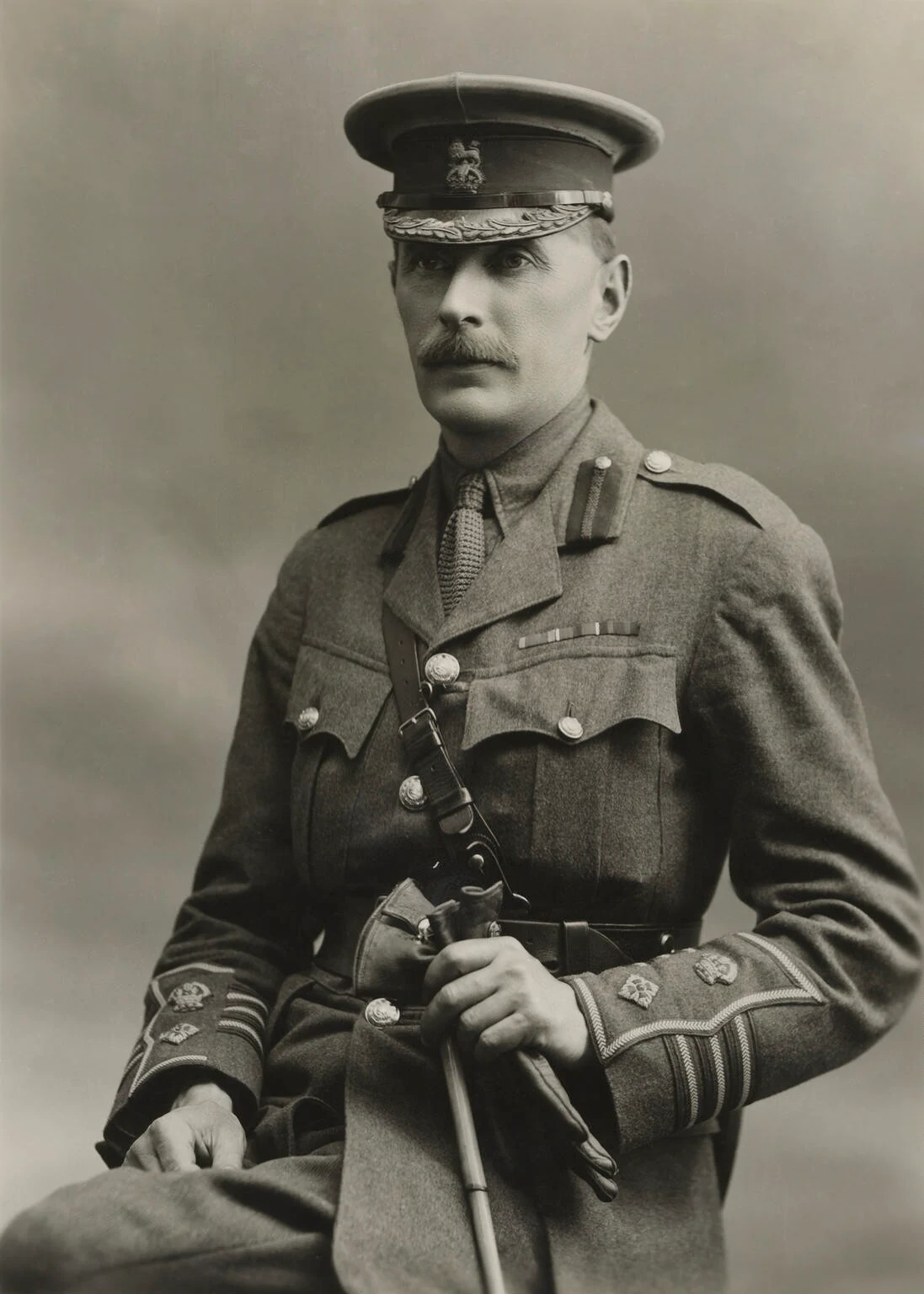
General Charles Harington, commander of the Allied occupation forces in Constantinople.

Harington placed the Allied forces around Constantinople on alert. French troops holding the Çatalca sector were instructed to resist a Greek advance, British units were moved from the Asian side of the Straits, and Italian battalions were placed under Harington's command. Allied commanders met on 30 July to consider the defence of the city.

Harington also discussed the defence of the neutral zone with the French commander, General Charles Antoine Charpy. He offered a British brigade to support French forces in Thrace against a Greek advance and sought French assistance if the Turkish nationalists approached the zone from the Asian side. French officials further proposed moving Greek troops back from the frontier and removing the Greek military missions and naval base from Constantinople. British representatives were reluctant to adopt measures that might themselves provoke a clash.

Although the Greek army had a numerical advantage on land, Britain possessed a much stronger naval force. British warships were deployed in the Sea of Marmara and around Constantinople, from where they could threaten the flank of a Greek army approaching the city. On 2 August, Allied admirals recommended that Greek warships be barred from the Bosporus and the waters around the neutral zone, and that violations be resisted by force.

The Ottoman minister of war offered to place 2,000 troops and 20,000 reservists under Harington's command, but Rumbold rejected the offer. British and French representatives considered the proposed use of Ottoman troops to be dangerous, while Italian representatives also opposed it.

==== Frontier incidents ====
There were several reported incidents along the frontier as Greek troops approached the neutral zone. Contemporary newspapers reported clashes involving Greek, Turkish and French troops, but disagreed about their circumstances and casualties. The reports also disagreed over whether the incidents had been deliberately provoked by Greek troops. Greek authorities maintained that one crossing into Turkish territory had been accidental.

On 1 August, Harington sent the Italian general Ernesto Mombelli, accompanied by British and French officers, to meet Greek commanders and clarify the boundary. After that, the Greek government ordered its forces to avoid further frontier incidents, and Baltatzis agreed that they should be pulled back from the line. Mombelli and the Greek commander, General Vlachopoulos, agreed on a six-kilometre separation between the Greek and Allied forces.

== Abandonment ==
On the afternoon of 28 July, the Greek cabinet decided at the last minute to suspend the planned advance. At midnight on 28–29 July, an urgent encrypted telegram was sent to the Greek High Commission in Constantinople while High Commissioner Charalambos Simopoulos was absent. After being deciphered, the message was passed to Greek admiral Ioannis Ipitis, who forwarded it by destroyer to Hatzianestis at Rodosto. Hatzianestis objected to the absence of a signature he considered necessary, but issued his order no. 42a by telephone, formally suspending the advance. According to historian Christos Angelomatis, some believe that, had the telegram not been deciphered that night, the advance towards Constantinople might have taken place, with unknown consequences. The formal Allied refusal on 31 July ended the prospect of a Greek occupation with Allied consent.

In a further diplomatic note on 3 August, Baltatzis protested against the Allied refusal and declared that "the entire responsibility for the continuance of the war falls upon the Allied powers". He also warned of further suffering among the Christians of Asia Minor. With Allied troops and warships ready to defend Constantinople, the Greek government dropped the operation. The stalemate in Anatolia continued until the Turkish so-called "Great Offensive" began later that month.

=== Aftermath and further attempts ===
Even after news of the Greek withdrawal from Afyonkarahisar had reached Athens, the royalist newspaper Skrip continued to call for the capture of Constantinople in an effort to revive public morale. In 1944, Edward Grigg, formerly Lloyd George's private secretary, recalled a separate Greek proposal in autumn 1922 to defend Constantinople against Turkish forces after the defeat in Anatolia. He stated that the Allies had rejected the offer on grounds of neutrality, while assuring Greece that the same restriction would apply to Turkey. Grigg described the subsequent developments as an "absolute breach of faith" towards Greece, "a very gallant Allied country", concluding that Allied conduct was "a terrible example of the way in which you may betray the trust which your own friends and allies place in you".

== Assessments ==
In the House of Commons on 4 August, Lloyd George argued that without the Allied occupation the Greeks could have taken Constantinople "in a very few hours". He also said the Greek army had established military superiority in pitched battles but faced enormous difficulties in maintaining its communications across Anatolia. He acknowledged that British, French and Italian troops and navies were preventing the proposed advance, while maintaining that the Allies were right to do so. Historian Stavros T. Stavridis writes that, despite these statements, there was a probability that Lloyd George "personally would have welcomed a Greek occupation of Constantinople".

Winston Churchill considered the Greek army capable of occupying Constantinople without much difficulty. Churchill also noted that the threat alone had disturbed and caused fear among the Turkish nationalists in Ankara. Lord Curzon believed that preventing the advance had denied Greece a way to strengthen its position against the Turkish nationalists. At a meeting with Curzon on 2 October 1922, Eleftherios Venizelos also criticized the Allies' refusal to permit the Greek advance.

After the cancellation, Ecumenical Patriarch Meletius IV sent the Metropolitan of Metres to visit Greek troops in Thrace. On his return, the metropolitan stated that "[i]t is lamentable that Christian nations seek to obstruct our path towards the fulfilment of our nation's destiny". A Westminster Gazette editorial also criticized the Allied occupation for protecting Constantinople against the Greek army while French and Italian ships carried ammunition through the Straits for the Turkish nationalists. It argued that if the Allies would not allow Greece to take measures to win the war, they should at least allow it to withdraw from it.

Harold Nicolson argued, retrospectively, that the Allied veto had deprived Greece of an operation that could have been carried out with relative ease, raised the Greek army's morale and considerably strengthened its position against the Turkish nationalists. Sociologist Neoklis Sarris described the cancellation of the operation as a missed opportunity, arguing that the Greek soldiers greatly outnumbered the Allied troops in Constantinople and that Turkish nationalists lacked naval forces with which to cross the Straits. He considered it reasonable that Greece's frontier could have reached the Bosporus.

Historian Michael Llewellyn Smith wrote that, if Greek troops marched to Constantinople, Britain could close the Straits, blockade Piraeus, and take other measures to pressure Greece into reconsidering. He concluded that Greece could have defied France and Italy with British support, but could not act against the united opposition of all three powers. He also criticized the latter for declaring themselves neutral while denying belligerent rights to the parties, describing their position as "entirely illogical".

Historian Ioannis Papafloratos described the proposed occupation as a "clever manoeuvre". Historian Peter Kincaid Jensen also wrote that Greece "correctly reasoned" that an occupation of Constantinople would be "an excellent trump card".

=== Troop management assessments ===
==== Contemporary ====
Former commander-in-chief Anastasios Papoulas estimated that 21,000 men had been transferred to Thrace, based on information he said he received from the Smyrna army's supply and transport staff. He maintained that the withdrawal had contributed substantially to the collapse of the Anatolian front. In contrast, general Konstantinos Mazarakis-Ainian, despite being an opponent of the Greek government that took office after the November 1920 elections, believed that keeping the transferred battalions in Anatolia would not have altered the outcome.

==== Modern ====
Jensen argued that the transfer of troops from Anatolia to Thrace weakened the Greek army on the Anatolian front. Military historian Edward J. Erickson cited the official Greek campaign history's conclusion that the troop withdrawals had no significant consequences, commenting that it was "arguable", but also "true that only a regimental equivalent had been redeployed from the FAAM's vulnerable southern flank." Instead, he emphasized the fact that the operation had taken Hatzianestis away from his headquarters in Anatolia at a critical time.

Papafloratos wrote that no more than 7,000 men had been detached from the Anatolian reserves. Citing Major Panagiotis Panagakos, he added that only one of the withdrawn battalions was effectively missed when the Turkish offensive began.

== See also ==
- Megali Idea
- Chanak Crisis

== Sources ==
- Alevizos, Dimitrios (2022). "Οι Επιχειρησιακές Παράμετροι που Επέδρασαν στην Τελική Φάση των Επιχειρήσεων στη Μικρά Ασία". Στρατηγείν (in Greek) (4): 27–52.
- Bozkurt, Abdurrahman (2021). İngiliz Perspektifinden Türkiye ve Millî Hareket (1918-1922): Mondros Mütarekesi’nden Çanakkale Krizi’ne (PDF) (in Turkish). İstanbul: Ötüken Neşriyat. ISBN 978-625-408-217-7.
- Daleziou, Eleftheria (2002). Britain and the Greek-Turkish war and settlement of 1919–1923: the pursuit of security by 'proxy' in Western Asia Minor (PhD thesis). University of Glasgow.
- Depastas, Nikolaos Sol. (1986). "Αντιστράτηγος Γεώργιος Χατζανέστης (1863–1922), ο Έλλην, ο ηγήτωρ, ο άνθρωπος" (PDF). Παρνασσός (in Greek). 28 (1): 99–119.
- Eglezou, Georgia (2009). The Greek Media in World War I and its Aftermath: The Athenian Press on the Asia Minor Crisis. I.B. Tauris. ISBN 9781845117870.
- Erickson, Edward J. (2021). The Turkish War of Independence: A Military History, 1919–1923. Santa Barbara, California: Praeger. ISBN 9781440878411.
- Finefrock, Michael M. (1980). "Atatürk, Lloyd George and the Megali Idea: Cause and Consequence of the Greek Plan to Seize Constantinople from the Allies, June–August 1922". The Journal of Modern History. 52 (1): D1047–D1066.
- "Greece and Constantinople". Parliamentary Debates (Hansard). Vol. 157. Commons. 31 July 1922. col. 1017–1020.
- "Near East". Parliamentary Debates (Hansard). Vol. 157. Commons. 4 August 1922. col. 1986–2008.
- "War and International Situation". Parliamentary Debates (Hansard). Vol. 397. Commons. 23 February 1944. col. 864–865.
- Jensen, Peter Kincaid (1979). "The Greco-Turkish War, 1920–1922". International Journal of Middle East Studies. 10 (4): 553–565. doi:10.1017/S0020743800051333.
- Kargakos, Sarantos (2020). "Ο στρατηγός Γεώργιος Χατζανέστης και το σχέδιο καταλήψεως της Κωνσταντινουπόλεως (Ιούλιος 1922)". Orthodoxi Poreia (in Greek).
- Kıbıl, Mehmet (2025). "İngiliz Genelkurmayının Rapor ve Analizlerine Göre Türk Kurtuluş Savaşı". Belleten (in Turkish). 89 (315): 719–765. doi:10.37879/belleten.2025.719.
- Knight, C. R. B. (1951). Historical Records of the Buffs, Royal East Kent Regiment, 1919–1948 (PDF). London: The Medici Society.
- Krassas, Ioannis (5 October 2021). "Το Χρονικό της Μικρασιατικής Καταστροφής (Β΄ Μέρος)". Σύνδεσμος Αποφοίτων ΣΣΕ Τάξεως 1971 (in Greek).
- Llewellyn Smith, Michael (1998). Ionian Vision: Greece in Asia Minor, 1919–1922. London: C. Hurst & Co.
- Medlicott, W. N.; Dakin, Douglas; Lambert, M. E., eds. (1970). Documents on British Foreign Policy, 1919–1939. First Series. Vol. XVII: Greece and Turkey, 1921–1922. London: H.M. Stationery Office. ISBN 0115915176.
- Papafloratos, Ioannis S. (9 May 2022). "Σχέδια για δύο ζώνες άμυνας και κατάληψη της Πόλης". Kathimerini (in Greek).
- Sarris, Neoklis (18 October 2009). "Τρεις φορές η Κωνσταντινούπολη προσφέρθηκε σε «ελληνικά χέρια» και αυτά την απώθησαν". Το Παρόν (in Greek) – via Dimitris Konstantakopoulos (reprinted 29 May 2022).
- Stavridis, Stavros T. (1999). "Constantinople: A City under Threat July 1922". Balkan Studies. 40 (2): 339–359.
- Stavridis, Stavros T. (2008). The Greek-Turkish War 1918–23: An Australian Press Perspective. Piscataway, New Jersey: Gorgias Press. ISBN 9781593339678.
- Stoukas, Michalis (9 April 2022). "Κωνσταντινούπολη: Το σχέδιο κατάληψής της από τον Ελληνικό Στρατό το 1922 και γιατί δεν υλοποιήθηκε". Proto Thema (in Greek).
- Tsouknida, Panagiota (2022). Ο Ελληνικός Στρατός στη Μικρά Ασία την περίοδο 1921–1922: Ο Αντίκτυπος της Πορείας προς το Τέλος στον Ελληνικό Τύπο (PDF) (Master's thesis) (in Greek). Neapolis University Pafos.
- Valsamis, Christos A. (2013). Ο Αθηναϊκός τύπος για την εκκένωση της Ανατολικής Θράκης, Οκτώβριος–Νοέμβριος 1922 (PDF) (Master's thesis) (in Greek). Democritus University of Thrace.
- Vidakis, Ioannis; Georgantas, Dimitrios (9 November 2022). "Εκκένωση Αθήνας [480 π.Χ.] και Καταστροφή Σμύρνης [1922 μ.Χ.]". Geopolitico (in Greek).
- Yıldırım, Eda (2016). Mütareke Döneminde Çatalca'da Asayiş Durumu (1918–1922) (PDF) (Master's thesis) (in Turkish). Istanbul University.
- Zürcher, Erik J. (2017). Turkey: A Modern History (PDF) (4th ed.). I.B. Tauris.
