= Andreas Michalakopoulos =

Greek politician (1876–1938)

- Ανδρέας Μιχαλακόπουλος
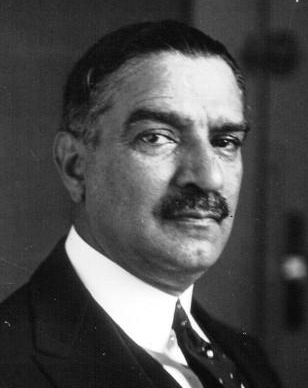
- Andreas Michalakopoulos in 1927

Prime Minister of Greece
- In office 7 October 1924 – 26 June 1925
- President: Pavlos Kountouriotis
- Preceded by: Themistoklis Sofoulis
- Succeeded by: Theodoros Pangalos

Personal details
- Born: 17 May 1876 Patras, Greece
- Died: 7 March 1938 (aged 61) Paros, Greece
- Resting place: First Cemetery of Athens, Athens, Greece
- Party: Liberal

Andreas Michalakopoulos (Greek: Ανδρέας Μιχαλακόπουλος; 17 May 1876, Patras – 7 March 1938, Athens) was an important liberal politician in the interwar period who served as Prime Minister of Greece from 7 October 1924 to 26 June 1925, the day after the overthrow of the government by Greek Army troops led by General Theodoros Pangalos, who forced President Pavlos Kountouriotis to dismiss the government and appoint Pangalos as the new Premier.

Michalakopoulos was a senior member of the Liberal Party and a close associate of its founder, the Greek statesman Eleftherios Venizelos, for more than 20 years. With Venizelos he participated in the negotiations for the international treaties of Sèvres and Lausanne, and co-signed as Foreign Minister the Greek-Turkish Friendship Convention (also known as the Treaty of Ankara) on 30 October 1930.

He held important posts in several governments led by Eleftherios Venizelos, Alexandros Zaimis and Konstantinos Tsaldaris; Foreign Minister (1928–1933), Minister for Economy (1912–1916), Minister for Agriculture (1917–1918, 1920), Minister for Military Affairs (1918).

Opposed to the military dictatorship of Ioannis Metaxas, he was sent to political exile on Paros in 1936, which resulted in his death in 1938.

He was buried in the First Cemetery of Athens.

== See also ==
- Incident at Petrich
- Honorary Knight Commander of the Order of the British Empire

Political offices
Preceded by Themistoklis Sophoulis	Prime Minister of Greece; 1924–1925	Succeeded by Theodoros Pangalos
