= Konstantinos Pallis =

Greek army officer

- Κωνσταντίνος Πάλλης
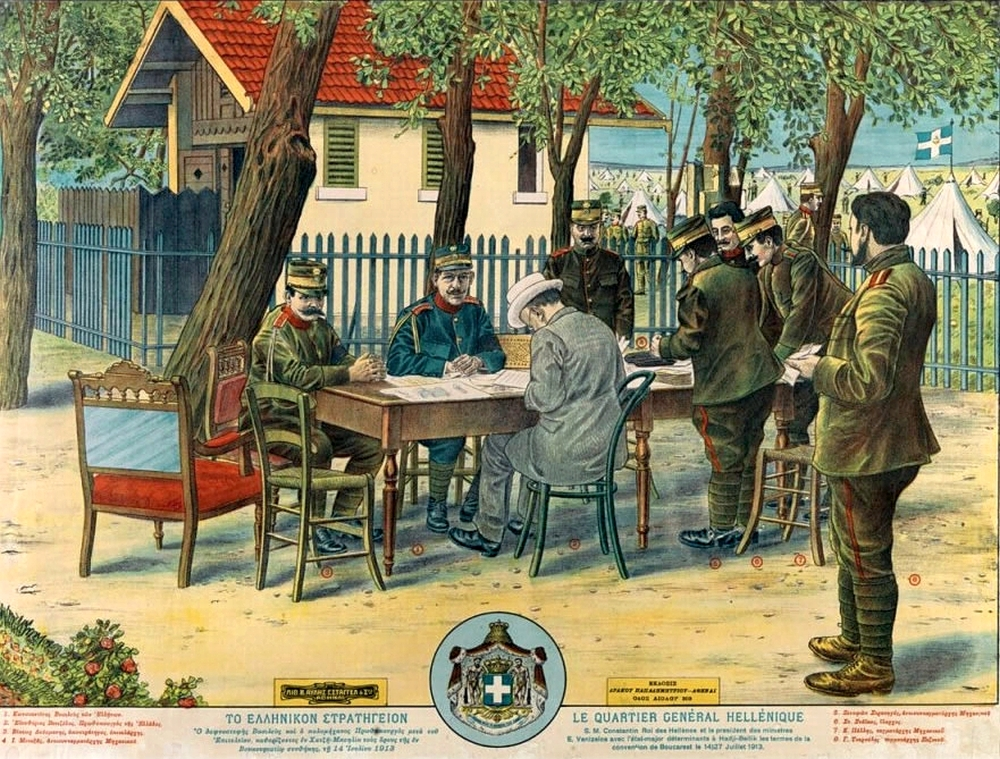
- Konstantinos Pallis c. 1913 (second to the right)
- Born: c. 1871; Athens, Kingdom of Greece
- Died: c. 1941; Athens, Kingdom of Greece
- Education: Hellenic Military Academy
- Military career
- Allegiance: Kingdom of Greece
- Branch: Hellenic Army
- Service years: 1889–1923; 1927; 1940–1941
- Rank: Lieutenant General
- Commands: Chief of the Hellenic Army General Staff; Chief of Staff of the Army of Asia Minor
- Wars: Greco-Turkish War (1897): Cretan Revolt; Balkan Wars: First Balkan War; Second Balkan War; Greco-Turkish War (1919–1922): Greek Retreat; Battle of Dumlupinar; World War II: Greco-Italian War; Battle of Greece
- Other work: Minister Governor-General of Macedonia

Konstantinos Pallis (Greek: Κωνσταντίνος Πάλλης; 1871–1941) was a staff officer of the Hellenic Army, who served as chief of staff of the Army of Asia Minor in 1920–22, and as Chief of the Hellenic Army General Staff during the Greco-Italian War of 1940–41.

== Life ==
Born in Athens on 5 March 1871, Pallis entered the Hellenic Military Academy and graduated on 31 July 1883 as an Artillery 2nd Lieutenant. During the Greco-Turkish War of 1897 he served in the expeditionary corps sent to Crete under Colonel Timoleon Vassos.

In 1904 he became a lieutenant, followed by promotions to captain II class (1910) and I class (1911). During the Balkan Wars of 1912–13 he served as a staff officer in the General Headquarters of the Crown Prince, and later King, Constantine I of Greece. Pallis was promoted to major in 1913, lieutenant colonel in 1915, and colonel in 1917. In 1915–17 he was head of the Army Staff Service's 3rd Directorate, responsible for training and history.

Due to his monarchist views, he was dismissed from the army in 1917–20, but after the electoral victory of the pro-monarchist United Opposition in November 1920, he was recalled to active service and appointed chief of staff to the Army of Asia Minor, under Lieutenant General Anastasios Papoulas. In 1921 he was promoted to major general. He remained in his post until Papoulas's dismissal on 23 May 1922, after which he too requested to be reassigned. Following the Turkish offensive and the dismissal of Papoulas's successor Georgios Hatzianestis, Pallis was reinstated as chief of staff of the rapidly disintegrating Army of Asia Minor, under Lt. General Georgios Polymenakos, on 26 August.

He retired from service on 28 November 1923. In 1927, the Special Military Council decided his re-activation and promotion to lieutenant general, but Pallis declined and resumed his retirement.

On 7 December 1935, he was appointed as Minister Governor-General of Macedonia in the cabinet of Konstantinos Demertzis, a post he continued to hold under Demertzis's successor, Ioannis Metaxas, until his resignation on 2 June 1936.

Upon the outbreak of the Greco-Italian War on 28 October 1940, Pallis was recalled to active service and placed Chief of the Field Army General Staff, a position he held until February 1941.

He died in the same year, at the age of 70.

Political offices
Preceded by Michail Mantas	Minister Governor-General of Macedonia; 7 December 1935 – 2 June 1936	Succeeded by Nikolaos Tsipouras
Military offices
Preceded by Maj. General Theodoros Pangalos	Chief of Staff of the Army of Asia Minor; November 1920 – May 1922	Succeeded by Maj. General Georgios Valettas
Preceded by Maj. General Georgios Valettas	Chief of Staff of the Army of Asia Minor; 26 August – early September 1922	Collapse of the Greek front, evacuation of Asia Minor
Preceded by Lt. General Alexandros Papagos	Chief of the Hellenic Army General Staff; 28 October 1940 – February 1941	Succeeded by Maj. General Napoleon Batas
