= Konstantinos Nider =

Greek general (c. 1865–1942)

Lieutenant general Konstantinos Nider
- Κωνσταντίνος Νίδερ
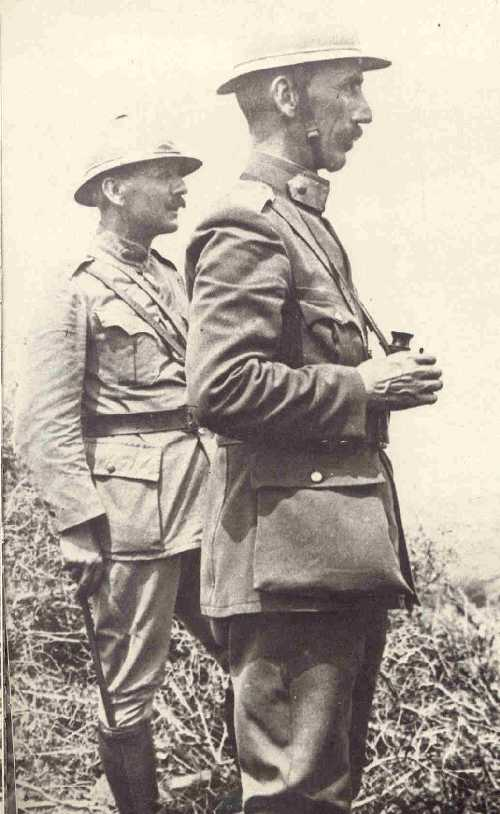
- Nider (right), with his chief of staff, Colonel Theodoros Pangalos c. 1917–1918
- Born: c. 1865 (Note: Greece Old Style dating); Missolonghi, Kingdom of Greece
- Died: 1942 (aged 76–77); Athens, Hellenic State
- Education: Hellenic Military Academy
- Military career
- Allegiance: Kingdom of Greece
- Branch: Hellenic Army
- Service years: 1884–1922; 1922–1923
- Rank: Lieutenant general
- Commands: I Army Corps (Chief of Staff); 1st Infantry Division; Army of Asia Minor; Army of Thrace
- Wars: Greco-Turkish War (1897); Balkan Wars; First Balkan War; Second Balkan War; First World War; Macedonian front; Russian Civil War; Allied intervention in the Russian Civil War; Southern Front; Southern Russia Intervention; Greco-Turkish War (1919–1922)
- Other work: Vice Minister of Military Affairs

Konstantinos Nider (Greek: Κωνσταντίνος Νίδερ; c. 1865 – 1942) was a Greek military officer. A lieutenant general in the Hellenic Army, he distinguished himself during the First World War and the Greco-Turkish War (1919–1922).

== Biography ==
Nider was born in Missolonghi in approximately 1865, the son of the military doctor Franz Xaver Nieder, one of the many Bavarians who had come to Greece with King Otto (r. 1832–1862). He entered the Hellenic Military Academy and graduated on 12 August 1887 as a second lieutenant of the Engineers. Subsequently, Nider served for eight years in the Austro-Hungarian Geodetic Mission to Greece, which laid the foundations of the Greek Army's own Geographic Service. Promoted to lieutenant in 1890 and to captain in 1898, he was a member of the Greco-Ottoman boundary commission after the Greco-Turkish War of 1897, and was sent to France for further studies in 1903. Upon his return he was promoted to major and placed in the newly established Hellenic Army General Staff, and then in the staff of the 3rd Infantry Division. In 1910–14, he served as head of the Personnel Office of the army, and as chief of staff of the rear-area and support troops during the First Balkan War of 1912 to 1913. He was promoted to lieutenant colonel in 1911. In 1914 he was promoted to colonel and became chief of staff of the I Army Corps.

During the National Schism of 1914 to 1917 he remained loyal to King Constantine I. However, as he was not marked as an ardent monarchist, he remained in the army following the King's exile and the assumption of power by the king's rival, Prime Minister Eleftherios Venizelos, in June 1917. Venizelos' victory led to the immediate entry of the whole country into World War I on the side of the Entente.

In June 1917, Nider was given command of the 1st Infantry Division. In December 1918, he was given command of I Army Corps, which soon after participated in the Allied intervention in Southern Russia (1918–1919), fighting the Bolsheviks in the Crimea and Odessa during the Russian Civil War. On 2 June 1919, he was appointed head of the Greek Army of Asia Minor for the zone around the city of Smyrna (İzmir). He held this post until December, when he returned to his duties as CO of I Corps, which formed part of the occupation force. From this position, Nider became involved in the subsequent battles of the Greco-Turkish War of 1919–22 until he was replaced in February 1922.

Following his replacement, Nider tended his resignation, but after the Greek defeat in Asia Minor in August 1922 and the overthrow of the monarchist government by Venizelist officers, Nider was recalled to active service on 21 September and placed at the head of the Army of Thrace until his resignation on 25 December 1923. He became Vice Minister of Military Affairs in 1925, and head of the Military Household of the President of Greece (his former chief of staff, Theodoros Pangalos, had become dictator in 1925) from April to August 1926, whereupon he retired from active service and public life.

He died in 1942.

== Sources ==
- Συνοπτική Ιστορία του Γενικού Επιτελείου Στρατού 1901–2001 [A Concise History of the Hellenic Army General Staff 1901–2001] (in Greek). Athens: Hellenic Army History Directorate. 2001. ISBN 960-7897-44-7.
