= Georgios Valettas =

Georgios Valettas (Greek: Γεώργιος Βαλέττας) was a Greek general, who served as divisional commander and chief of staff of the Army of Asia Minor in the Asia Minor Campaign.

Georgios Valettas was born on 23 October 1870, and entered the Hellenic Army Academy, graduating as an Engineers officer on 8 August 1891. He served as a professor in the Academy, fought in the Balkan Wars of 1912–13, and by 1916 was chief of staff of the IV Army Corps in Kavala. He followed the corps into captivity in Görlitz, where he spent the remainder of World War I. Restored to active service following the royalist electoral victory in November 1920, he was appointed commander of the 2nd Infantry Division in the ongoing war against Turkey. In May 1922, when Lt. General Georgios Hatzianestis became commander-in-chief of the Army of Asia Minor, Valettas became his chief of staff, holding the post during the disastrous Battle of Dumlupinar and the collapse of the Greek front in Asia Minor. He retired in October 1922 with the rank of Major General.

Military offices
Preceded by Maj. General Konstantinos Pallis	Chief of Staff of the Army of Asia Minor; May – 26 August 1922	Succeeded by Maj. General Konstantinos Pallis
