= Army of Evros =

Greek field army of 1922–1923

- Commander-in-Chief Theodoros Pangalos inspects the Army of Evros
- Active: 1922–1923
- Country: Kingdom of Greece
- Branch: Hellenic Army
- Type: Field army
- Size: c. 100,000 (April 1923)
- Garrison/HQ: Evros, Western Thrace

Commanders
- Notable commanders: Konstantinos Nider; Theodoros Pangalos

The Army of Evros (Greek: Στρατιά Έβρου) was a field army of Greece stationed in Western Thrace in 1922–1923, following the defeat of the Army of Asia Minor in the Greco-Turkish War (1919–1922). Reorganized under General Theodoros Pangalos, it became a force of approximately 100,000 men by the spring of 1923. Its presence opposite the Turkish forces in Eastern Thrace influenced the peace negotiations at Lausanne, when renewed hostilities between Greece and Turkey remained a possibility.

According to Turkish delegate Rıza Nur, both he and İsmet Pasha feared that a Greek offensive across the Evros would overwhelm the Turkish forces in Eastern Thrace and result in the capture of Constantinople.

== History ==
=== Formation and reorganization ===
The Army of the Evros was formed from Greek forces remaining after the defeat and evacuation of the Army of Asia Minor from Anatolia in August–September 1922, together with units already serving in Thrace. Under the Armistice of Mudanya in October 1922, Greece was obliged to evacuate Eastern Thrace, which had been awarded to it under the Treaty of Sèvres in 1920, and withdraw behind the Evros (Maritsa) River. The new military concentration was intended both to defend Greece's remaining territory in Western Thrace and to provide an effective force should the conflict with Turkey resume.

The reorganization began under General Konstantinos Nider in October 1922. In December, he was succeeded by Lieutenant General Theodoros Pangalos, who undertook an extensive reconstruction of the army. Its units were drawn from formations evacuated from Asia Minor, troops withdrawn from Eastern Thrace and additional forces mobilized in Greece. The task was complicated by shortages of equipment and supplies and by the disorder resulting from the army's defeat in Anatolia. Pangalos introduced severe disciplinary measures, including the summary execution of deserters and the expulsion of civilians suspected of cooperating with Bulgarian irregulars.

By April 1923, the army had approximately 100,000 men organized into ten combat-ready divisions. Historian Jędrzej Paszkiewicz also describes the reorganization as successful and identifies a force of more than 100,000 soldiers capable of carrying out an offensive into Eastern Thrace. The army included the II, III and IV Corps.

=== Plans for renewed hostilities ===
Although the Armistice of Mudanya had ended active hostilities, the possibility of another Greco-Turkish war persisted during negotiations over a final peace settlement at Lausanne. The most contentious questions included the Turkish demand for Greek war reparations and the future of the border in Thrace. Plans were drawn up for a Greek crossing of the Evros and an advance into Eastern Thrace. General Alexandros Mazarakis-Ainian, who inspected the army on behalf of Eleftherios Venizelos, considered it capable of advancing towards the Çatalca defensive lines near Constantinople.

The prospects of a successful campaign nevertheless depended on factors beyond the army's immediate strength. These included the ability of the Greek navy to prevent Turkish reinforcements from crossing the Straits, the attitude of the Allied powers occupying Constantinople, and the possibility of Bulgarian attack. Britain and France, in particular, opposed a renewed war and regarded the Greek military build-up with apprehension. Venizelos preferred to use the army's strength to reinforce Greece's negotiating position, instead of committing it to a new campaign.

=== Turkish response and the Lausanne negotiations ===
The army's strength caused considerable concern and fears among Turkish representatives. A British Foreign Office annual report covering 1923 described the Greek forces in Western Thrace as a formidable army and assessed the Turkish forces assembled on the opposite side of the river as substantially inferior. The report stated that the Turkish authorities themselves were aware of this imbalance. It further observed that fear of a Greek advance into Eastern Thrace had been a persistent preoccupation of the Turkish leadership and had exercised a restraining influence on its conduct.

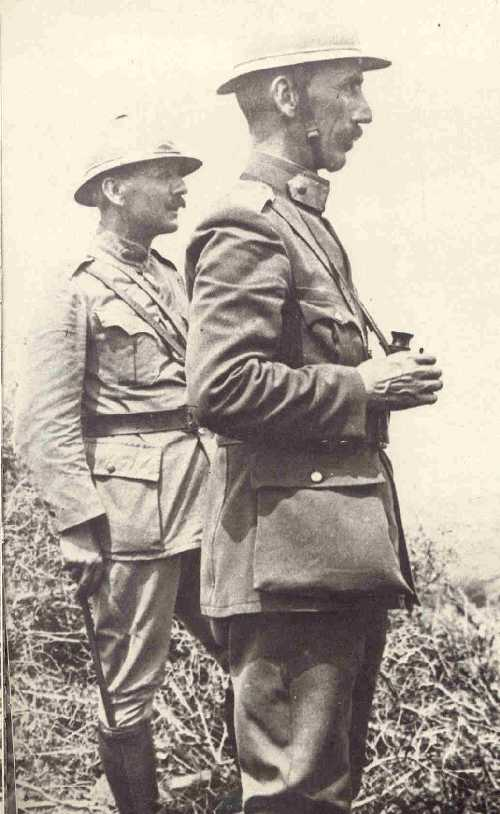
Pangalos and Nider, the two commanders of the Army of Evros, at the Macedonian front during World War I.

Rıza Nur, a member of the Turkish delegation at Lausanne, described his intense fear that a renewed Greek offensive could result in the capture of Constantinople. Upon receiving reports that General Theodoros Pangalos intended to cross the Evros, Nur recalled becoming "terribly frightened". He estimated that Turkey had only about 10,000 troops in Eastern Thrace, without artillery or any realistic prospect of reinforcement, and feared that they would be unable to resist the Greek army. According to Nur, İsmet Pasha warned that the Greek navy could cut off the Turkish forces' line of retreat. Both men feared that the Greeks could advance as far as Constantinople and capture the city. Nur recalled İsmet declaring that, unless Turkey abandoned its demand for reparations, Pangalos would attack and "undoubtedly take Constantinople as well". Nur wrote that the prospect of such a catastrophe and the sheer terror caused by Pangalos' Army of Evros convinced both men to support abandoning the reparations demand, despite contrary instructions from Ankara.

İsmet then sought to remove the threat represented by the Greek army by reaching a settlement over reparations. Settling that dispute would eliminate an immediate reason for renewed Greek military action and deprive the Allied powers of a means of applying military pressure on Turkey. The British representatives at Lausanne, meanwhile, urged compromise and sought to prevent the Greek forces from crossing the Evros.

On 26 May 1923, a compromise was reached. Greece acknowledged responsibility for wartime damage but was relieved of a monetary reparations payment, while Turkey obtained Karaağaç and adjoining territory west of the Evros. The settlement removed one of the principal immediate causes of a possible resumption of fighting.

=== Abandonment of the offensive plans ===
Despite the army's preparations, the Greek government did not order an attack. The principal obstacle was the danger of a wider conflict, rather than the strength of the Turkish formations immediately across the Evros. Allied forces remained deployed around Constantinople and the Straits, and the British, French and Italian governments opposed renewed fighting. Greek planning also had to allow for the possibility of Turkish reinforcements crossing into Eastern Thrace and for Bulgaria entering the war against Greece. Although the Army of the Evros had been rebuilt, it remained short of heavy artillery following the losses in Asia Minor.

Diplomatic efforts to obtain support from the Kingdom of Serbs, Croats and Slovenes did not produce a commitment to join another war. Its government promised diplomatic support for Greece over reparations and discussed discouraging a Bulgarian attack, but maintained that it would remain neutral in a renewed Greco-Turkish conflict. In May 1923, Yugoslav foreign minister Momčilo Ninčić declined to make the promised diplomatic approach to Bulgaria, explaining that Belgrade did not wish to encourage Greek military action. Venizelos, for his part, regarded the approval of the Allied powers and Bulgarian neutrality as indispensable conditions for any Greek offensive.

The crisis became acute in May 1923 when the Turkish delegation persisted in demanding reparations that Greece declared itself unable to pay. The threat of renewed war was real, as military preparations continued and the Greek representatives warned that they might leave Lausanne if the dispute remained unresolved. On 24 May, British delegate Horace Rumbold cautioned Venizelos against an adventurous policy, while Allied diplomats worked to secure a compromise. On 26 May, the delegates agreed to a formula under which Turkey would abandon its demand for monetary reparations in exchange for Greece's recognition of its obligation and the transfer of Karaağaç and its environs. American representative Joseph Grew reported that the agreement had been reached after a tense meeting, ending the immediate threat of a breakdown in the negotiations.

The settlement removed the immediate grounds for a Greek attack. Venizelos regarded renewed war as a danger to Greece, noting the current political and diplomatic situation, and, as a result, the army remained in Western Thrace without engaging in battle.

=== Disbandment ===
The signature of the Treaty of Lausanne on 24 July 1923 pre-empted the resumption of war, and the Army of the Evros was disbanded soon after. The decision was vehemently opposed by Pangalos, who likened the Treaty of Lausanne to another "Treaty of Antalcidas".

== Sources ==
- Chalkos, Ioannis S. (2018). "Ο Θεόδωρος Πάγκαλος και ο αναθεωρητισμός απέναντι στην Τουρκία: Η εσωτερική διάσταση της εξωτερικής πολιτικής της δικτατορίας (1925–26)" [Theodoros Pangalos and revisionism towards Turkey: The domestic dimension of the dictatorship's foreign policy (1925–26)]. Μνήμων (in Greek). 36: 223–254. doi:10.12681/mnimon.36960.
- Demirci, Sevtap (2010) [2005]. Strategies and Struggles: British Rhetoric and Turkish Response: The Lausanne Conference, 1922–1923. Gorgias Press. ISBN 9781463225742.
- Δασκαρόλης, Ιωάννης Β. (7 February 2024). "Θεόδωρος Πάγκαλος – Από αρχιστράτηγος στον Έβρο, στη φυλακή του Ιτζεδίν". Η Καθημερινή (in Greek).
- Grew, Joseph C. (1923). "The Special Mission at Lausanne to the Secretary of State, May 27, 1923". Papers Relating to the Foreign Relations of the United States, 1923. Vol. II. United States Government Printing Office. pp. 1010–1012.
- Loupas, Athanasios (2016). "From Paris to Lausanne: Aspects of Greek-Yugoslav Relations during the First Interwar Years (1919–1923)". Balcanica. 47: 263–284. doi:10.2298/BALC1647263L.
- Nur, Rıza (1994). Toker, Yalçın (ed.). Millî Kıyam (Millî Mücadelenin İçyüzü) (in Turkish). Istanbul: Toker Yayınları. ISBN 9754450315.
- Paszkiewicz, Jędrzej (2019). "Main challenges for the Greek national security against the geopolitical changes in the Balkans during the period 1918–1923". Balcanica Posnaniensia. Acta et studia. 26: 193–212. doi:10.14746/bp.2019.26.11.
- Satan, Ali, ed. (2012). İngiliz Yıllık Raporlarında Türkiye (1923) [Turkey in British Annual Reports (1923)] (in Turkish and English). Istanbul: Tarihçi Kitabevi. ISBN 9786054534135.
- Spentzos, Georgios (2014). "Η Στρατιά του Έβρου, οι ελληνικές εναλλακτικές, και η Συνθήκη της Λωζάννης" [The Army of the Evros, Greek alternatives, and the Treaty of Lausanne] (PDF). Βαλκανικά Σύμμεικτα (in Greek). 16. Institute for Balkan Studies: 171–191. ISSN 2407-9456.
