= 1926 Greek presidential election =

- April 4–11, 1926
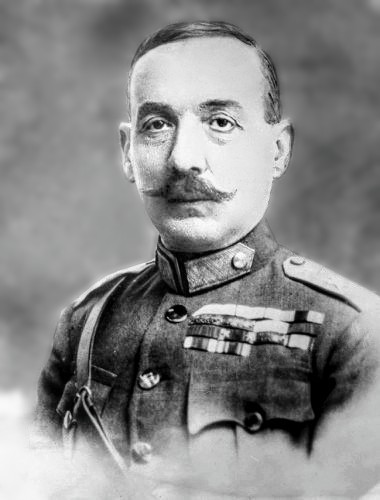

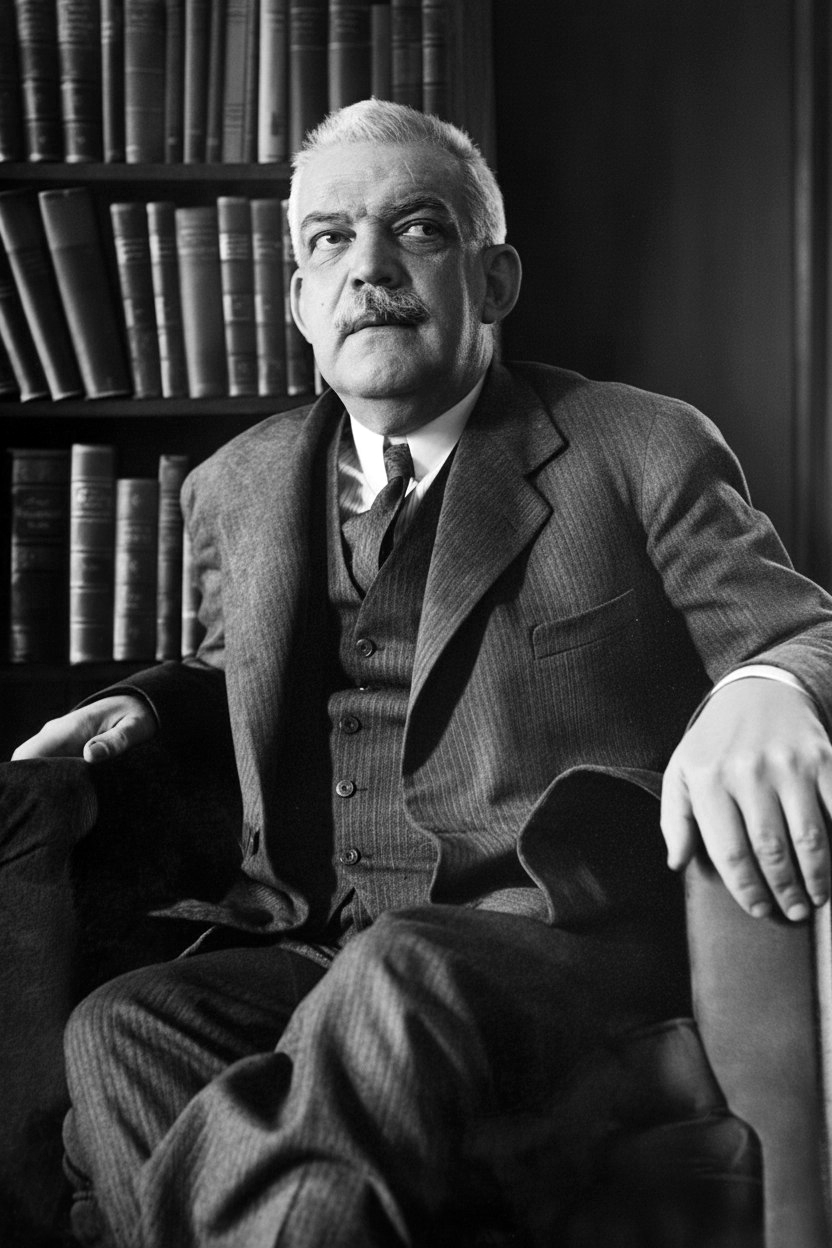
Nominee	Theodoros Pangalos	Konstantinos Demertzis
Party	Independent	KE
Popular vote	782,589	56,126
Percentage	93.31%	6.69%
President before election
Theodoros Pangalos
Independent
Elected President
Theodoros Pangalos
Independent

Presidential elections were held in Greece between 4 and 11 April 1926. At the time the country was a dictatorship under Theodoros Pangalos, who had led a coup the previous year. Pangalos who was one of the two candidates; the other, Konstantinos Demertzis, withdrew from the contest before election day, but remained on the ballot paper. Pangalos received 93% of the vote. However, he was removed from office on 22 August following a counter-coup and was replaced by Pavlos Kountouriotis.

== Results ==
Candidate	Votes	%
Theodoros Pangalos	782,589	93.31
Konstantinos Demertzis	56,126	6.69
Total	838,715	100.00
Source: Nohlen & Stöver
