= Ionideios Model High School of Piraeus =

Ionideios Model School of Piraeus
- Ιωνίδειος Σχολή Πειραιά

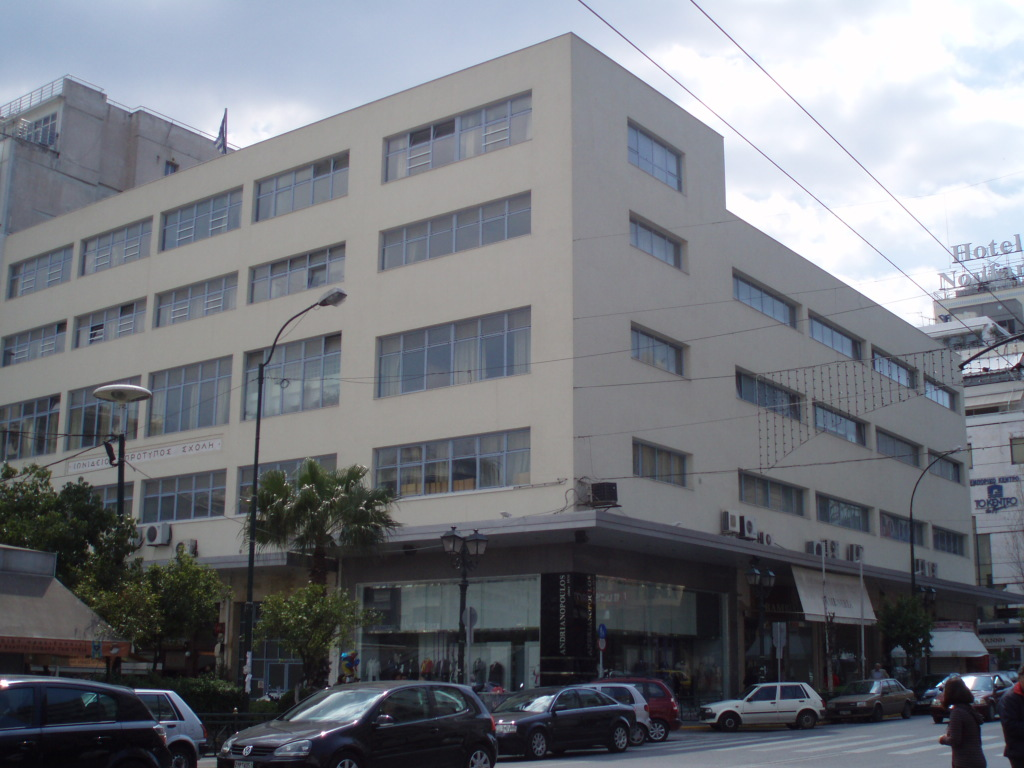

Location
- Sotiros Dios 17; Piraeus, Greece, Attica, 185 35; 37°56′31″N 23°38′47″E

Information
- School type: Gymnasium and Lyceum
- Founded: 1847; 179 years ago
- Principal: Matakias Sotirios (Lyceum - High School) & Georga Evangelia (Gymnasium - Junior High School)
- Age: 11 to 18
- Enrollment: 648
- Classes: 24; 12 Lyceum; 12 Gymnasium
- Average class size: 27
- Students Association Board: Δεκαπενταμελές Ιωνιδείου (Dekapentameles Ionidiou)
- Mascot: Piraeus Lion and Owl of Athena
- Website: www.ionidios.gr, lyk-peir-ionid.att.sch.gr

Ionideios (or Ionidios) School of Piraeus (Greek: Ιωνίδειος Σχολή Πειραιά [ionˈiðios sxoˈli pireˈa]) is a school in Piraeus, Greece. It was founded in 1847, and it was named after the Greek national benefactor Constantine Ionides (Greek: Κωνσταντίνος Ιωνίδης), father of Alexander Constantine Ionides.

== History ==
Ionideios was established in 1847. However, its history began in 1844, when Petros Omiridis Skylitsis, the Mayor of Piraeus at the time, addressed Konstantinos Ionidis by letter and asked for help in setting up schools in Piraeus. In his reply to the mayor, Constantinos Ionides stated that he would provide 30,000 drachmas, an amount of great importance at the time, provided that the Municipality of Piraeus would purchase the land and pay for the future cost of the school in order to function. In 1845, the City Council accepted these terms together with some others that the donor had set.

Two years later, in 1847 and on the mayoralty of Dimitrios Theocharis, the construction of the school began and on 21 May of the same year while the donor provided 10,000 drachmas more for the needs of the school and the creation of a library. In 1862, the establishment of the Gymnasium was signed by the then Minister of Education. Until 1914, the school housed the only Gymnasium in Piraeus. This year, with the foundation of the Second Gymnasium in the city of Piraeus, Ionides renamed the school to First Gymnasium. The Gymnasium operated in the original building of 1847 until 1932, when it was demolished, in order to erect in its place the building in which it is housed today. In 1963, Minister of Education Grigorios Kasimatis renamed the school to Ionideios Model School of Piraeus. Since 1986, the official name has been set to be "Model Gymnasium and Lyceum of Ionideios" and it is usually referred to as "Ionideios Model School of Piraeus".

== Enrollment ==
Every year the Greek Μinistry of Εducation organises exams for the 17 model schools of Greece, one of which is Ionideios. Students apply for a place in one of these 17 schools and the highest scoring ones are accepted. Ionideios accepts 108 students each year. In 2020, 595 students applied. In case a student leaves the school for any reason before their graduation, a special exam is organised in order to fill their position.

== Facilities ==
The building of the School is located on the western side of the block that is formed by Korai Square, Iroon Polytechniou str. and Sotiros Dios str., in the center of Piraeus. Students and teachers use the entrance of 17, Sotiros Dios Street. On the ground floor are the concierge, the canteen, the Event Hall and the Gymnasium's Computer Laboratory. On the first floor is the courtyard, indoor gymnasium, the Chemistry Lab, 4 classrooms, which are used by the first grade of Lyceum, the Multimedia Lab and the Library. On the second floor are the offices of the Directors, the deputy directors, the Secretariats and the Office of the Teachers, four classes of teaching, which are used by the 2nd grade of Lyceum, as well as the Physics and Biology Laboratories. On the third floor, there are twelve classrooms, which are used by the entire Gymnasium as well as another computer lab. On the fourth floor, there are four classrooms, which are used by the Third Grade of Lyceum, a special class for humanitarian Studies, as well as a robotics lab. More than half of the rooms are equipped with interactive whiteboards.

=== Library ===
At Ionideios, there is a library from the first years of its foundation, which is one of the largest School Libraries in Greece. It has an area of 90 sqm and contains 24 bookshelves.

The library houses 2 collections, the old collection of Ioneidos and the newest one. The old collection lists 5,556 titles, according to the latest census of 1999, when the new School Library was funded under the EU's 2nd Community Support Framework. At that time the old collection was enriched with 4,600 titles and audiovisual material. The new library is continuously enriched with new material and to date it contains over 13,000 books and audiovisual material as well as magazines of varied content. In addition, electronic book search can be done through ABEKT's electronic automation system at the National Documentation Centre.

All library material is classified with the US DEWEY decimal system and is managed through the ABEKT system.

=== Computer laboratories ===
The gymnasium's computer laboratory is located on the ground floor of the building and is equipped with a network of multiple workstations connected to a central computer. The Multimedia Hall, on the first floor, is a multi-purpose lab. In it take place the computer courses of Lyceum, as well as the lessons of other Lyceum courses. Finally, on the third floor, there is the second and the smallest gymnasium's computer laboratory, which is equipped with around 15-20 workstations.

=== Graduates ===
Since its foundation, the school has hosted students such as Alexandros Papadiamantis, Pavlos Nirvanas, Spyros Melas, Lambros Porphyras, Demosthenes Voutiras, Evangelos Papanutsos, Gerasimos Vokos, Ap. Kampanis, Alexandros Pallis, Pantelis Horn, George Pyrunakis, Dimitris Pikionis, Emilios Veakis, Menelaos Pallandios, Vassilis Diamantopoulos, Ioannis Sakellarakis, George Veis, Sakis Boulas, Vangelis Germanos, Dimitris Papadimitriou, George Pukamisas, Christos Mylonopoulos, Giannis Papaspyrou, George Bobolas, Konstantinos Mazarakis Ainian, the general dictator Theodoros Pagalos, Panagiotis Pipinelis, Thanasis Pafilis, Konstantinos Tzoumas, Konstantinos Arvanitopoulos, George Katrougalos, Takis Theodorikakos, George Gerapetritis, the oli bionic sailor Virginia Kravariotis, journalist Kostas Vernikos, Dr. CERN physicist Ignatios Antoniadis, Nikos Sarandakos, Nikos Xanthoulis, lawyer Kostantinos Daltas, surgeon Andreas Tzakis, etc.

== Notable alumni ==
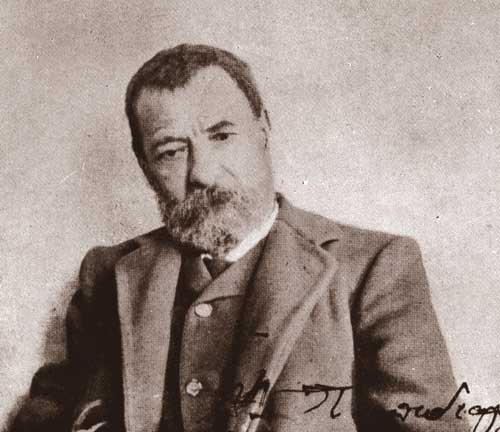
Alexandros Papadiamantis

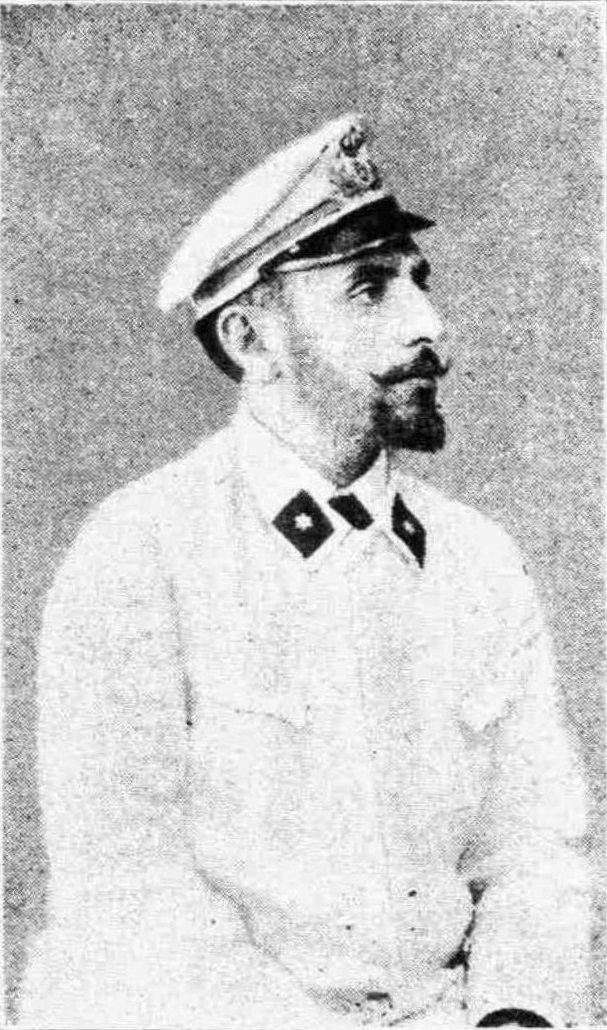
Pavlos Nirvanas

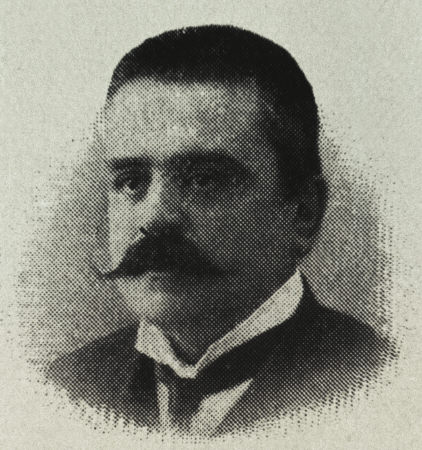
Gerasimos Vokos

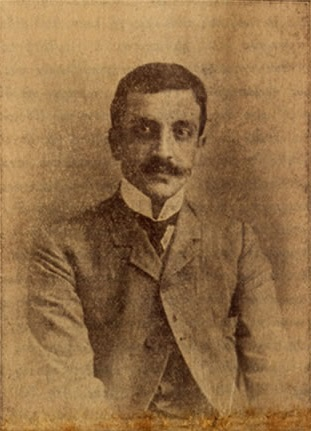
Pantelis Horn

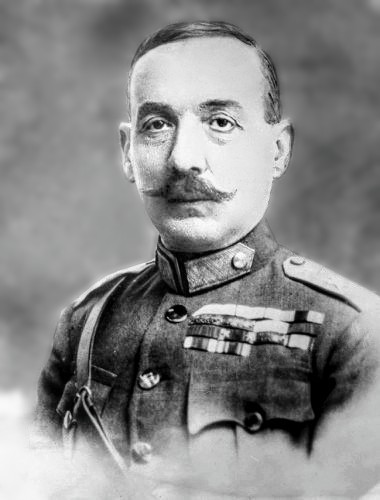
Theodoros Pangalos

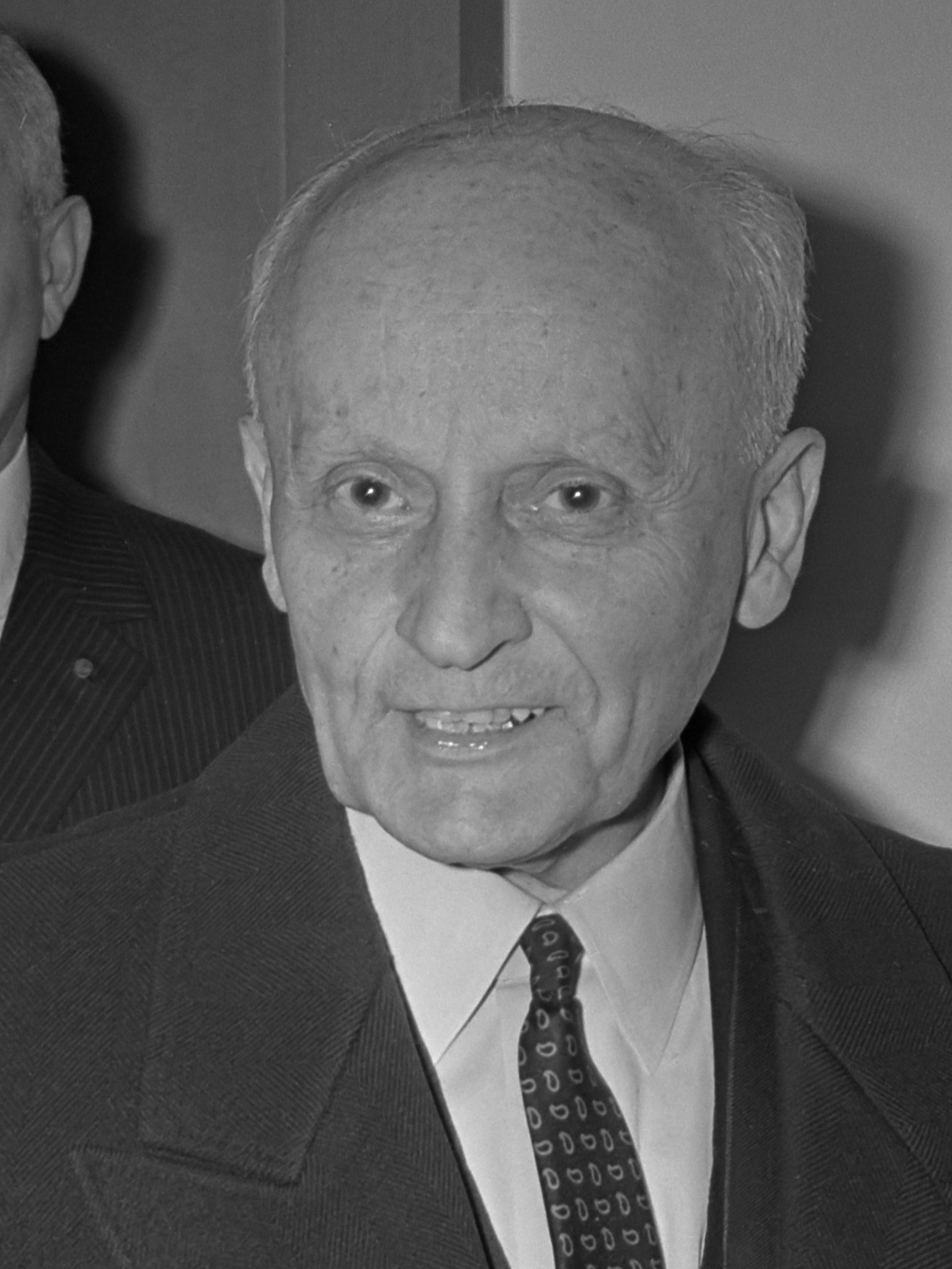
Panagiotis Pipinelis

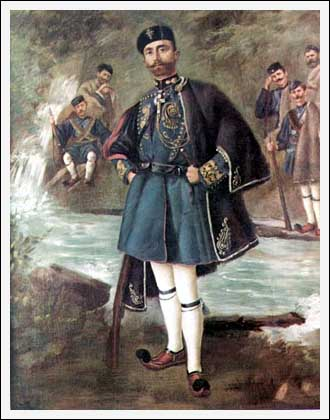
Konstantinos Mazarakis-Ainian
