= Nikolaos Tsipouras =

Hellenic Army officer

- Nικόλαος Τσίπουρας
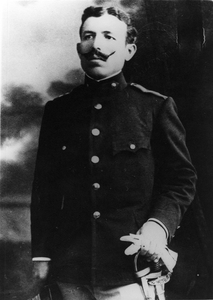
- Nikolaos Tsipouras c. 1904-1908
- Born: c. 1880; Platanos, Nafpaktia, Kingdom of Greece
- Military career
- Allegiance: Kingdom of Greece; Auton. Rep. of Northern Epirus; (Greece) Second Hellenic Republic
- Branch: Hellenic Army; HMC
- Service years: 1901–1929
- Rank: Major General
- Unit: 8th Infantry Division
- Wars: Macedonian Struggle; Balkan Wars: First Balkan War; Battle of Bizani; Second Balkan War; North Epirote Struggle; World War I: Macedonian front; Battle of Skra-di-Legen; Greco-Turkish War (1919-1922): Greek Retreat; Battle of Dumlupınar
- Other work: Minister Governor-General of Macedonia

Nikolaos Tsipouras (Greek: Nικόλαος Τσίπουρας) was a Hellenic Army officer who fought in the Macedonian Struggle, the Balkan Wars, the North Epirote Struggle, World War I and the Asia Minor Campaign, retiring as a Major General.

== Life ==
Nikolaos Tsipouras was born on 1 June 1880 (O.S.) in the village of Platanos, in Nafpaktia. He enlisted in the Hellenic Army in October 1901. In 1905, Tsipouras joined the Greek armed guerrillas in Macedonia as part of the Macedonian Struggle, fighting in the Florina–Monastir area, and again in 1907–08 in the Veroia–Naoussa–Vodena area as leader of his own troop.

He fought in the Balkan Wars of 1912–13 as an officer in an Evzone battalion of the 8th Infantry Division in the Epirus front, and was wounded in the Battle of Bizani. After the end of the Balkan Wars he temporarily resigned his commission and joined the forces of the Autonomous Republic of Northern Epirus, commanding the Northern Epirote forces in the Leskovik–Kolonje district.

From 1917 he fought in the Macedonian front of World War I. He particularly distinguished himself in the Battle of Skra-di-Legen in May 1918, where he was wounded and received a field promotion to lieutenant colonel. In the Asia Minor Campaign, he served as deputy commander and later commander of the 53rd Infantry Regiment. He was once more distinguished during the long and successful retreat of his parent unit, the Independent Division, to the sea and Lesbos after the Battle of Dumlupinar. He continued his service as regimental and divisional commander, and retired with the rank of Major General on 10 October 1929.

On 2 June 1936, he was appointed as Minister Governor-General of Macedonia in the cabinet of Ioannis Metaxas, serving until 21 March 1937.

Political offices
| Preceded by Konstantinos Pallis | Minister Governor-General of Macedonia; 2 June 1936 – 21 March 1937 | Succeeded by G. Kyrimis |
