= Tarlis incident =

Minor military conflict between Bulgaria and Greece in July 1924

The Tarlis incident was the killing of 17 ethnically-Bulgarian peasants by a Greek officer on July 27, 1924, at Tarlis (present-day Vathytopos), a mountain village in the Kato Nevrokopi, region near the Greco-Bulgarian border.

== Background ==
Tarlis (Τърлис), Loftsa (Ловча) and Karakioi (Каракьой) were three ethnically-Bulgarian villages that had remained inside Greek territory after the Greco-Bulgarian border had been drawn in accordance with the Treaty of Bucharest (1913).

Out of a total population of 800, only 50 individuals were ethnically Greek and were recently-settled refugees from the population exchange between Greece and Turkey.

Martial law had been imposed in Greece by the Themistoklis Sophoulis government, which had taken office three days earlier, on July 24, 1924.

== Incident ==
Official Greek reports stated that in the evening of Saturday, July 26, 1924, residents of Tarlis had gathered in the village's square discussing the issue of repatriation between Greece and Bulgaria according to the 1919 Treaty of Neuilly, which provided for the voluntary exchange of populations between Greece and Bulgaria. The deadline for issuing resettlement admissions was five days later, on July 31, 1924.

Suddenly, some shots and explosions were heard from a nearby gorge. Major Kalabalikis, the Greek officer in charge of the region, ordered the arrest of 70 ethnicaly-Bulgarian peasants from the three villages, suspected as being responsible.

The next day, Sunday July 27, 1924, Kalabalikis ordered his military aide lieutenant Doxakis, a Greek officer from Crete, to transport 27 of the captured villagers to the district administration in Serres for interrogation, via the village of Gorno Brodi.

Doxakis, who was in charge of 10 Greek soldiers, led the bound captives via a mountain path that bypassed the usual road between Tarlis and Gorno Brodi. He returned five hours later to announce that his squad had been attacked by Bulgarian guerrillas and that when the prisoners tried to escape, he was forced to kill 17 of them.

== Reaction ==
Immediately after the incident in Petrich, a civil committee was formed, which appealed to the international community for intervention against the Greek atrocities. The Tarlis incident triggered large-scale protests in Bulgaria and an international outcry against Greece. The Mixed Commission for Greek-Bulgarian Emigration investigated the incident and presented its conclusions to the League of Nations in Geneva.

As a result, upon the League of Nations' demand, a bilateral Bulgarian-Greek agreement was signed in Geneva on September 29, 1924, known as the Politis–Kalfov Protocol, recognising the "Greek slavophones" as ethnic Bulgarians and guaranteeing their protection. The pext month, a primer textbook for the ethnic Bulgarian population (in a newly-invented Latin-based alphabet and not mentioning the name "Bulgarian"), known as Abecedar, was published by the Greek authorities and introduced to schools of Greek Macedonia.

On February 2, 1925, the Greek Parliament, claiming pressure from Yugoslavia (which had threatened to renounce the Greek–Serbian Alliance of 1913), refused to ratify the agreement, which lasted nine months until June 10, 1925, when the League of Nations annulled it.

== See also ==
- Incident at Petrich
