= Athanasios Eftaxias =

Greek politician

- Αθανάσιος Ευταξίας
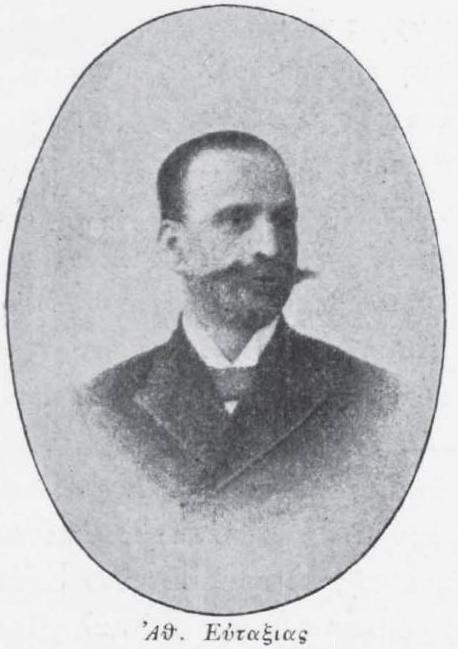

Prime Minister of Greece
- In office 19 July 1926 – 23 August 1926
- President: Theodoros Pangalos
- Preceded by: Theodoros Pangalos
- Succeeded by: Georgios Kondylis

Personal details
- Born: 8 January 1849 Amfikleia, Phthiotis, Greece
- Died: 5 February 1931 (aged 82) Athens, Greece
- Party: Independent

Athanasios Eftaxias (Greek: Αθανάσιος Ευταξίας; 8 January 1849 – 5 February 1931) was a Greek politician. He was born in Amfikleia, Phthiotis, and was briefly Prime Minister of Greece from 19 July to 23 August 1926. He died in Athens.

Political offices
| Preceded by Theodoros Pangalos | Prime Minister of Greece; 1926 | Succeeded by Georgios Kondylis |
