= European interwar dictatorships =

List of dictatorships in Europe between World War I and World War II

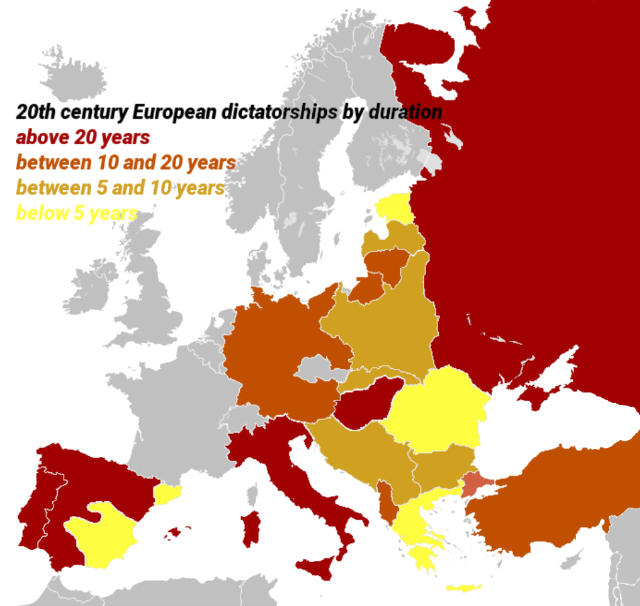
20th century European dictatorships by duration; governments established during WWII are excluded.

This is a list of dictatorial regimes operational in European states in the interwar period, the period between World War I and World War II.

== Table summary ==
| Country | Leader | Start | End | Head of state | Head of government | Head of state party | Parliament | Parties | Elections |
|---|---|---|---|---|---|---|---|---|---|
| Albania | Ahmed Zogu | 1925-02-01 | 1939-04-07 | yes | until 1928 | no | redesigned | NP | yes |
| Austria | Engelbert Dolfuss, Kurt Schuschnigg | 1933-03-07 | 1938-03-13 | no | yes | yes | redesigned | OP | no |
| Bohemia and Moravia | Emil Hácha | 1939-03-16 | 1945-05-05 | no | yes | yes | none | OP | no |
| Bulgaria | Alexander Tsankov | 1923-06-09 | 1926-01-04 | no | yes | yes | coerced | MP | yes |
| Bulgaria | Boris III | 1935-01-22 | 1943-08-28 | yes | no | no | redesigned | NPO | yes |
| Czechoslovakia | collective | 1938-09-30 | 1939-03-15 | n/a | n/a | n/a | coerced | MP | no |
| Danzig | collective | 1933-06-24 | 1939-09-01 | n/a | n/a | n/a | coerced | MP | yes |
| Estonia | Konstantin Päts | 1934-03-12 | 1940-06-17 | no | yes | no | redesigned | NPO | yes |
| Germany | Adolf Hitler | 1933-01-30 | 1945-04-30 | 1934-1945 | yes | yes | coerced | OP | yes |
| Greece | Theodoros Pangalos | 1925-06-24 | 1926-08-26 | since 1926 | until 1926 | no | coerced | MP | yes |
| Greece | Ioannis Metaxas | 1936-08-04 | 1941-04-25 | no | yes | no | none | NP | no |
| Hungary (S) | Béla Kun | 1919-03-21 | 1919-08-01 | no | no | yes | none | MP | no |
| (Kingdom of Hungary (1920–1946)) Hungary (W) | collective | 1919 | 1920 | n/a | n/a | n/a | none | MP | no |
| Hungary (W) | Miklós Horthy | 1920-03-01 | 1944-10-15 | yes | no | no | coerced | MP | yes |
| Italy | Benito Mussolini | 1922-10-31 | 1943-07-25 | no | yes | yes | redesigned | MP (until 1926); OP (after 1926) | yes |
| Latvia | Kārlis Ulmanis | 1934-05-15 | 1940-06-15 | since 1936 | yes | no | none | NP | no |
| Lithuania | Antanas Smetona | 1926-12-19 | 1940-06-15 | yes | no | until 1926 | redesigned | MP (until 1936); OP (after 1936) | yes |
| Poland | Józef Piłsudski | 1926-05-14 | 1935-05-12 | no | 1926–1930 | no | coerced | MP | yes |
| Poland | collective | 1935-05-12 | 1939-09-17 | n/a | n/a | n/a | coerced | MP | yes |
| Portugal | Sidónio Pais | 1917-12-17 | 1918-12-14 | since 1917 | yes | no | coerced | MP | yes |
| Portugal | collective | 1926-05-28 | 1933-03-19 | n/a | n/a | n/a | coerced | NP | yes |
| Portugal | António Salazar | 1933-03-19 | 1974-04-25 | no | yes | yes | redesigned | OP | yes |
| Romania | Carol II | 1938-02-11 | 1940-09-05 | yes | no | no | none | OP | yes |
| San Marino | Giuliano Gozi | 1923-04-01 | 1943-07-28 | intermittently | n/a | yes | coerced | MP (until 1925); OP | yes |
| Slovakia | Jozef Tiso | 1939-03-14 | 1945-04-01 | yes | until 1939 | yes | redesigned | MP | no |
| Russia (S) / Soviet Union | collective | spring 1918 | between 1927 and 1929 | n/a | n/a | n/a | coerced | MP (until 1922); NPO | yes |
| Russia (W) | collective | 1918-09-23 | 1918-11-18 | n/a | n/a | n/a | none | MP | no |
| Russia (W) | Alexander Kolchak | 1918-11-18 | after 1920-02-07 | yes | no | yes | none | MP | no |
| Soviet Union | Joseph Stalin | between 1927 and 1929 | 1953-03-05 | no | since 1941 | yes | redesigned | OP | yes |
| Spain | Miguel Primo de Rivera | 1923-09-23 | 1930-01-28 | no | yes | yes | redesigned | OP | no |
| Spain | collective | 1930-01-28 | 1931-04-14 | n/a | n/a | n/a | redesigned | MP | yes |
| Spain (N) | collective | 1936-07-18 | 1936-10-01 | n/a | n/a | n/a | none | MP | no |
| Spain (N) | Francisco Franco | 1936-10-01 | 1975-11-20 | yes | until 1973 | yes | redesigned | OP | no |
| Spain (R) | collective | 1936-07-18 | 1939-03-31 | n/a | n/a | n/a | coerced | MP | no |
| Turkey | Mustafa Kemal Atatürk | 1920-05-03 | 1938-11-10 | since 1923 | until 1921 | yes | redesigned | NPO | yes |
| Turkey | collective | 1938-11-10 | 1950-05-22 | n/a | n/a | n/a | redesigned | NPO | yes |
| Yugoslavia | Alexander I | 1929-01-06 | 1934-04-09 | yes | no | no | redesigned | OP | yes |
| Yugoslavia | collective | 1934-04-09 | 1941-03-27 | n/a | n/a | n/a | redesigned | MP | yes |

== See also ==
- Interwar period
- Dictatorship
