= Theodoros Pangalos =

Leader of Greece from 1925 to 1926

- Θεόδωρος Πάγκαλος
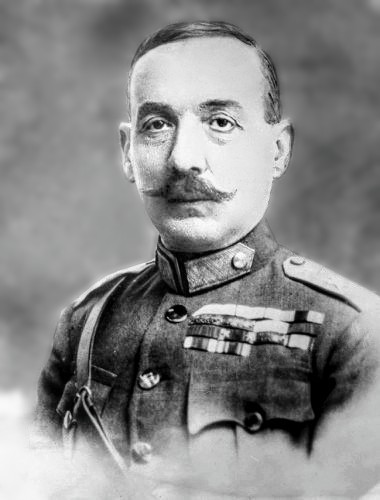
- Pangalos, c. early 1920s

President of Greece
- In office 15 March 1926 – 22 August 1926 (Note: Acting until 18 April 1926)
- Prime Minister: Himself; Athanasios Eftaxias
- Preceded by: Pavlos Kountouriotis
- Succeeded by: Pavlos Kountouriotis

Prime Minister of Greece
- In office 26 June 1925 – 19 July 1926
- President: Pavlos Kountouriotis; Himself
- Preceded by: Andreas Michalakopoulos
- Succeeded by: Athanasios Eftaxias

Minister of Military Affairs
- In office 26 June 1925 – 21 April 1926
- Prime Minister: Himself
- Preceded by: Konstantinos Gondikas
- Succeeded by: Charalambos Tseroulis
- In office 11 June 1924 – 24 July 1924
- Prime Minister: Alexandros Papanastasiou
- Preceded by: Georgios Kondylis
- Succeeded by: Georgios Katechakis
- In office 14 November 1922 – 12 December 1922
- Prime Minister: Stylianos Gonatas
- Preceded by: Anastasios Charalambis
- Succeeded by: Stylianos Gonatas

Minister of Law and Order
- In office 28 March 1924 – 18 June 1924
- Prime Minister: Alexandros Papanastasiou
- Preceded by: Ministry established
- Succeeded by: Iosif Koundouros

Personal details
- Born: 11 January 1878 Salamis, Kingdom of Greece
- Died: 26 February 1952 (aged 74) Athens, Kingdom of Greece
- Party: Independent (Venizelist)
- Spouse: Arianna Slias-Sachtouris (m. 1901)
- Relations: Theodoros Pangalos (grandson); Timoleon Vassos (distant relative)
- Children: 4
- Education: Ionideios Model High School of Piraeus; Hellenic Army Academy
- Occupation: Politician; soldier
- Awards: Order of the Redeemer; War Cross; Legion of Honour; Croix de Guerre

Military service
- Allegiance: Kingdom of Greece; Second Hellenic Republic
- Branch/service: Hellenic Army
- Years of service: 1900–1926
- Rank: Lieutenant general
- Commands: Army of the Evros
- Battles/wars: Greco-Turkish War (1897); Balkan Wars; First Balkan War; Second Balkan War; Battle of Demir Hisar; World War I; Macedonian front; Greco-Turkish War (1919–1922)

Theodoros Pangalos (Greek: Θεόδωρος Πάγκαλος, romanized: Theódoros Pángalos; 11 January 1878 – 26 February 1952) was a Greek general, politician and dictator, who ruled Greece from 24 June 1925 to 22 August 1926. A distinguished staff officer and an ardent Venizelist and anti-royalist, Pangalos participated in the Goudi coup in 1909, served with distinction in the Balkan Wars, Macedonian front of World War I, and the Greco-Turkish War (1919–1922), and played a leading role in the September 1922 revolt that deposed King Constantine I and in the establishment of the Second Hellenic Republic. In June 1925, Pangalos staged a bloodless coup d'État, and his assumption of power was recognised by the National Assembly, which named him prime minister. As a "constitutional dictator", he ruled the country until his overthrow in August 1926. From April 1926 until his deposition, he had also occupied the office of President of the Republic.

In his capacity as dictator, his government purged and imprisoned prominent Venizelist, anti-Venizelist and communist politicians and figures, imposed economic austerity measures, attempted to devalue the drachma by half and invested in agricultural projects. Individual freedoms were significantly abridged, the Hellenic Parliament was dissolved in September of 1925, and morality laws were enforced in manners similar to Fascist Italy and the Spanish Directorate.

Foreign policy was characterised by revanchism due to Pangalos's hatred of the Treaty of Lausanne, which he'd tried to avert as the commander of the Army of the Evros; he briefly led an invasion of Bulgaria known as the War of the Stray Dog and attempted to forge an alliance with Benito Mussolini's Fascist Italy against Turkey. To that end, a treaty with the Kingdom of Yugoslavia for preparations of war against Turkey was criticised as too concessionary, and with his political and financial support on the decline, a successful counter-coup by Georgios Kondylis overthrew him and imprisoned him until 1928.

Pangalos withdrew from public life for a while, but remained active in the Venizelist military circles. He was imprisoned from 1930 to 1932 on charges of plotting against the government of Eleftherios Venizelos, despite his own Venizelist beliefs. During the Axis occupation of Greece (1941–1945), Pangalos and military officers close to him played a role in the establishment of the Security Battalions. He was touted by occupational forces as a potential Prime Minister of the Hellenic State following the fall of Athens, but Georgios Tsolakoglou was chosen instead. He was widely suspected of collaboration with the Germans and was arrested by the first post-war government of Georgios Papandreou in 1944. Cleared by a postwar court the next year, he ran unsuccessfully for political office and died in 1952.

== Early career ==
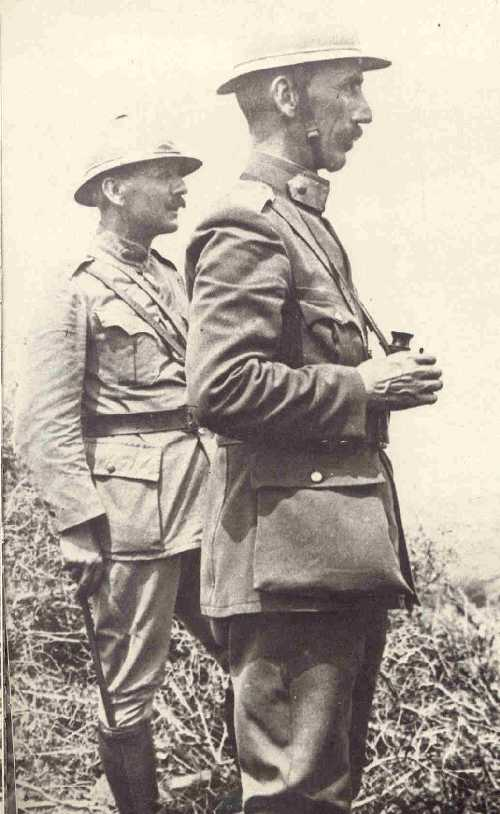
Pangalos with Konstantinos Nider, commander of the 1st Infantry Division, at the Macedonian front during World War I

Pangalos was born on the island of Salamis on 23 January 1878 (11 January on the Julian calendar used at the time in Greece). His mother was descendant of the local Arvanite fighter of the Greek Revolution, Giannakis Meletis (Hatzimeletis), while his paternal side came from an aristocratic family of Kea island.

He graduated from the Hellenic Army Academy on 29 July 1900 (16 July Greek calendar) as an Infantry Second Lieutenant, and continued his studies in Paris, France.

During the Balkan Wars of 1912–1913, he served as a staff officer in the 6th Infantry Division. He was head of the forces that entered Sidirokastro (Demir Hisar) during the second Balkan war.

In 1916, he joined Eleftherios Venizelos's Provisional Government of National Defence against King Constantine I, and was tasked with recruiting the 9th Cretan Regiment for the new government. He did not have a chance to lead it to battle though, because when King Constantine abdicated and Venizelos took over the governance of all of Greece in June 1917, he was appointed chief of the personnel department in the Ministry of Military Affairs. In early 1918 he went to the front as Chief of Infantry of the 1st Infantry Division in the Strymon sector of the Macedonian front. In late 1918, he was appointed chief of staff of the General Headquarters, holding the post until the electoral victory of the pro-royalist and anti-Venizelist United Opposition in November 1920, when he was dismissed from the army.

In 1922, Pangalos supported the 11 September 1922 Revolution, led by Nikolaos Plastiras, which abolished the monarchy and declared the Second Hellenic Republic, and played a major role in the rapid establishment of the regime in Athens, while Plastiras and the army were still sailing from Chios. His first job was to prosecute a number of prominent pro-monarchist government leaders by military court in what became known as the Trial of the Six. On 27 November (14 November Greek calendar) he was named Minister for Military Affairs and tasked with reorganizing the Greek army in Macedonia and Thrace, as the war with Turkey was not over, and an attack in the region was feared to be imminent. The reorganisation of the "Army of Evros", which he commanded from mid-December, was so successful that the Greek High Command prepared for a possible advance into Eastern Thrace in the face of the Turkish demands in the Lausanne peace talks. The military threat posed by Pangalos's army helped the Turks back down, and the Treaty of Lausanne was signed.

A staunch nationalist, Pangalos objected to the terms of the treaty and declared that his troops would attack Turkey nonetheless in order to block the deal. He was forced to resign, but his stance made him popular with the many segments of Greek society that objected to the treaty. During the period of political instability that followed, Pangalos jumped into the fray, gaining and losing a number of ministerial positions as governments came and went.

He assisted in the suppression of the failed Leonardopoulos–Gargalidis coup d'état attempt in October 1923, and was elected to Parliament for Thessaloniki in December. He was appointed Minister for Public Order in the cabinet of Alexandros Papanastasiou on 31 March 1924, holding the post until 18 June, when he became once more Minister for Military Affairs, retaining the post until the cabinet's resignation on 25 July 1924.

== In power ==
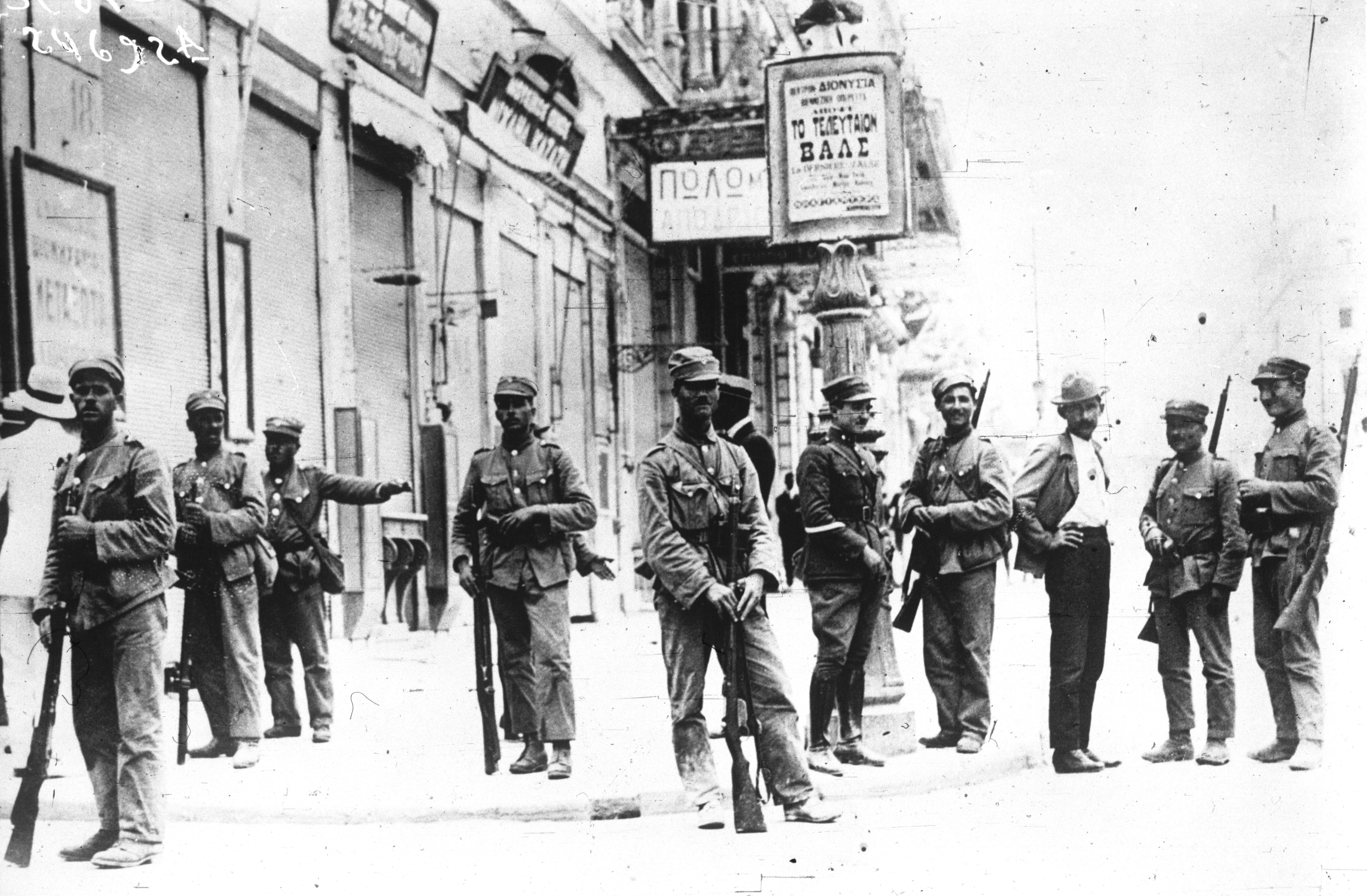
Soldiers on the streets of Athens during Pangalos's 1925 coup d'état

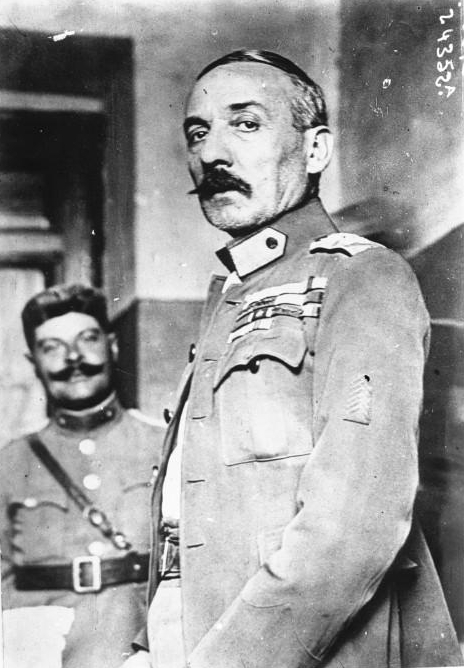
Pangalos shortly after his successful coup

On 24 June 1925, officers loyal to Pangalos, fearing that the political instability was putting the country at risk, overthrew the government in a coup and forced President Pavlos Kountouriotis to appoint Pangalos as Prime Minister. Pangalos immediately abolished the young republic and began to prosecute anyone who could possibly challenge his authority, including his old chief, Plastiras. Freedom of the press was abolished, and a number of repressive laws were enacted (including a law limiting the length of women's skirts to no shorter than 30 cm above the ground), while Pangalos awarded himself the Grand Cross of the Order of the Redeemer. Pangalos declared a state of emergency on 3 January 1926 and assumed dictatorial powers. In April 1926, he had himself elected president in a rigged election. On the economic front Pangalos attempted to devalue the currency by ordering paper notes cut in half.

His political and diplomatic inability however became soon apparent. He conceded too many rights to Yugoslav commerce in Thessaloniki, but worst of all, he embroiled Greece in the so-called War of the Stray Dog, harming Greece's already strained international relations. Soon, many of the officers who had helped him come to power decided that he had to be removed. Regarding relations with Turkey, he still did not agree with the Treaty of Lausanne and tried to form an alliance with fascist Italy in a war against Turkey, with no success.

On 22 August 1926, a countercoup led by General Georgios Kondylis deposed him. Pangalos was captured the next day after a group of sympathetic officers had helped him escape, and Kountouriotis returned as president, while Pangalos was imprisoned for two years in the Izzeddin Fortress.

== After his rule ==
In 1930, Pangalos was sent to prison for a building scandal. He remained in prison for two years and was released during a period when a number of amnesties were issued by Venizélos. He never regained the popular support he had before the coup, and never again played a role in Greek politics. After Greece fell to the Germans in 1941, Pangalos and other Venizelist officers moved to support the new collaborationist regime. He also played an important role, albeit from behind the stage, in the establishment of the Security Battalions, which he hoped to use against both the Communist-dominated National Liberation Front and against a possible return of King George II and the royal government from exile. Ambitious, tough and able, Pangalos was also widely distrusted for his rashness, megalomania and for being generally "half mad". Through Pangalos did not formally take a position with the Security Battalions, but he ensured his followers were given key positions in the Security Battalions. Pangalos was especially close to SS-Standartenführer Walter Blume, who was regarded as the most extreme and violent of all the SS leaders in Greece. Blume intrigued in the summer of 1944 to have Pangalos appointed prime minister of the puppet Hellenic State to replace Ioannis Rallis, who was very close to a nervous breakdown by that point. After liberation, Pangalos was arrested and put in Averof prison in Athens waiting trial for collaboration, but was cleared of all charges in September 1945. He unsuccessfully ran for parliament in 1950 and died in Kifissia two years later.

His grandson, also named Theodoros Pangalos, served as the Deputy Prime Minister of Greece. He was a member of the PASOK socialist party.

== In popular culture ==
Theodoros Pangalos is mentioned in the song "Stin epohi tou Pangalou" (In the times of Pangalos, Greek: Στην εποχή του Πάγκαλου) by Giorgos Mitsakis, originally sung by George Dalaras.

== Notes ==
Political offices
Preceded by Andreas Michalakopoulos	Prime Minister of Greece; 1925 - 1926	Succeeded by Athanasios Eftaxias
Preceded by Pavlos Kountouriotis	President of Greece; 15 March 1926 – 24 August 1926	Succeeded by Pavlos Kountouriotis
