= Georgios Hatzianestis =

Greek general (1863–1922)

- Γεώργιος Χατζηανέστης
- Georgios Hatzianestis in uniform
- Born: 3 December 1863; Athens, Kingdom of Greece
- Died: 15 November 1922 (aged 58); Goudi, Kingdom of Greece
- Education: Hellenic Army Academy
- Military career
- Allegiance: Kingdom of Greece
- Branch: Hellenic Army
- Service years: 1884–1922
- Rank: Lieutenant General
- Units: Hellenic Military Geographical Service; 6th Infantry Division
- Commands: 5th Infantry Division; 15th Infantry Division; Army of Thrace; Army of Asia Minor
- Conflicts: Greco-Turkish War (1897); Balkan Wars; First Balkan War; Second Balkan War; Greco-Turkish War (1919–1922); 1922 Constantinople crisis; Greek Retreat; Battle of Dumlupınar
- Awards: Order of George I Order of the Redeemer; Medal of Military Merit

Georgios Hatzianestis (Greek: Γεώργιος Χατζηανέστης, 3 December 1863 – 15 November 1922) was a Greek artillery and general staff officer who rose to the rank of lieutenant general. He is best known as the commander-in-chief of the Army of Asia Minor at the time of the Turkish August 1922 offensive, which he failed to stop. He was replaced and later tried in the Trial of the Six as one of the main culprits of the Greek defeat in the Asia Minor Campaign, condemned and executed.

== Life ==
Hatzianestis was born in Athens on 3 December 1863. His father was Nikolaos Hatzianestis, the Prefect of Attica and Boeotia, and his mother was Maria Pitsipios, daughter of the scholar Iakovos Pitsipios.

He graduated from the Hellenic Army Academy as a second lieutenant in the Artillery on 25 July 1884 and continued his military studies in Imperial Germany. After a period of service in the newly founded Hellenic Military Geographical Service, he served in the Greco-Turkish War of 1897 as a staff officer of the 3rd Brigade under Col. Konstantinos Smolenskis, before assuming command of the 2nd Mountain Artillery Battery on 27 April 1897. In 1904, he was one of the first officers appointed to the Staff Officers Corps, but resigned following the Goudi coup in 1909. In 1912 he returned to service as a Major of the Reserves and participated in the First Balkan War (1912–13) against the Ottoman Empire as chief of staff of the 6th Infantry Division and the 5th Infantry Division, returning to the 6th Division as chief of staff in the Second Balkan War against Bulgaria.

Following the Balkan Wars, Hatzianestis had his seniority restored by special legislation; disregarding his earlier three-year period of absence from the army. He was promoted to the rank of Colonel and became Director of the Hellenic Military Academy in August 1914. With the Greek mobilization in 1915, he was placed in command of the 5th Infantry Division at Drama, but after a mutiny among his troops in early 1916, he was shifted to command the 15th Infantry Division.

As a royalist, Hatzianestis was subsequently dismissed from the army by the Venizelists, spending the period 1917-20 abroad. He was however recommissioned following the Venizelist electoral defeat in November 1920. In April 1922 he was named commander of the Army of Thrace, and on 19 May as commander of the main Greek military force, the Army of Asia Minor. Shortly after his appointment, Hatzianestis began to show signs of mental instability, reportedly suffering from the delusion that his legs were made of glass and easily shattered. He was unable to respond effectively to the Turkish August 1922 offensive, and was replaced on 24 August by Lt. General Georgios Polymenakos.

Hatzianestis was the only military leader to be prosecuted during the Trial of the Six for his role in the Asia Minor Catastrophe. By the last stages of the trial, he had developed serious mental problems and depression. Found guilty of high treason, Hatzianestis was executed by firing squad, along with five politicians, on 15 November 1922. Hatzianestis' last words were "my only shame is that I commanded an army of deserters" (Η μόνη εντροπή μου είναι ότι υπήρξα αρχιστράτηγος φυγάδων), implying that the soldiers under his command were cowards. In 2010, the Supreme Court of Greece overturned the convictions of Hatzianestis and the other five defendants.

== Sources ==
Military offices
Preceded by Lt. General Anastasios Papoulas	Commander-in-chief of the Army of Asia Minor; 19 May – 24 August 1922	Succeeded by Lt. General Georgios Polymenakos
