= Çakmak Line =

Turkish defensive line built before the World War II

- Çakmak Hattı
- Eastern Thrace
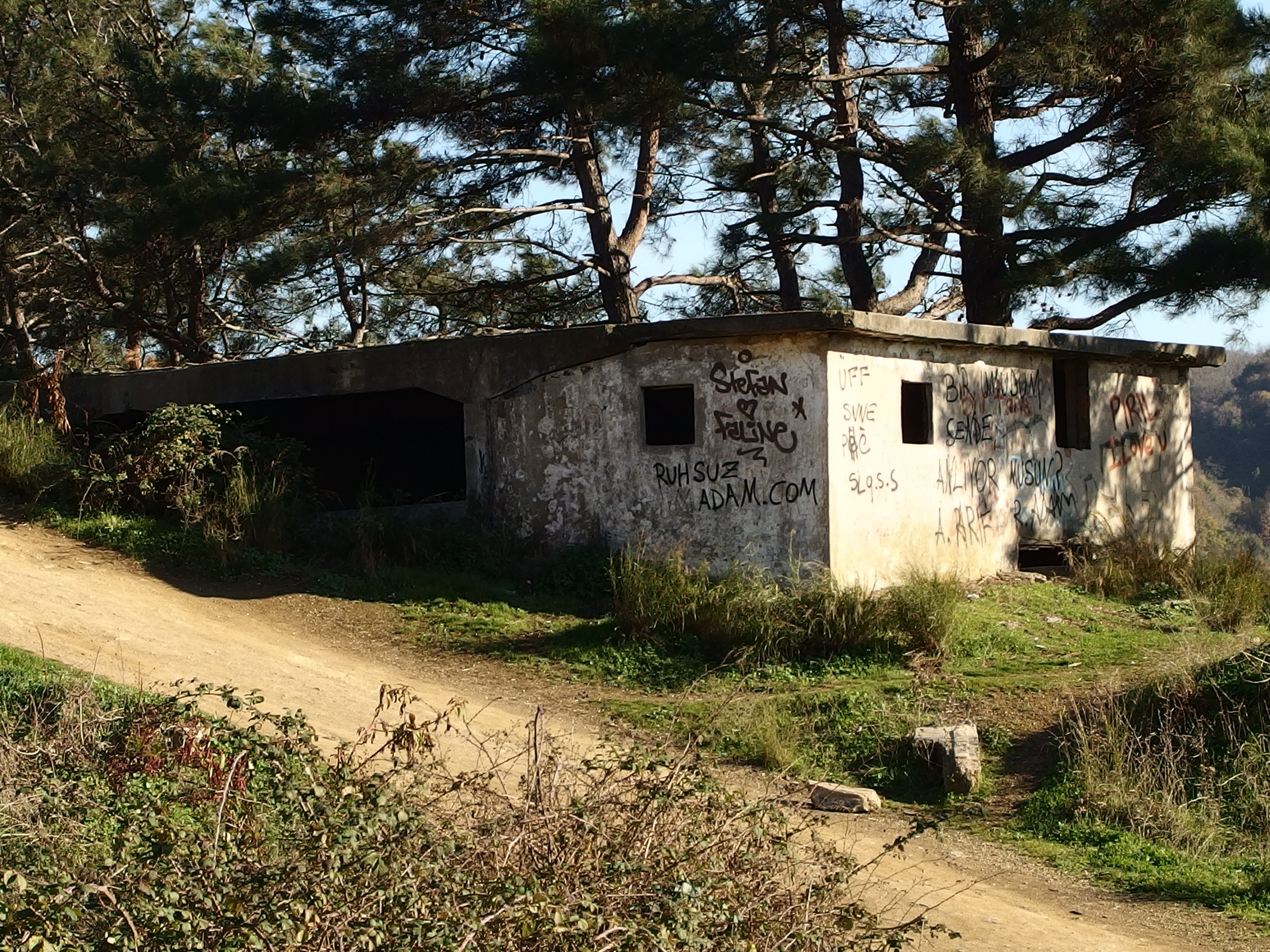

Site information
- Type: Defensive line
- Controlled by: Turkey
- Open to the public: Yes
- Condition: Abandoned

Site history
- Built: 1936–1941
- In use: 1936–1945
- Materials: Concrete and steel

The Çakmak Line (Turkish: Çakmak Hattı) is a defensive line established by Turkey, first on the Kırklareli-Edirne line and then in Çatalca in order to deter and counter any attack by the Germans on the Eastern Thrace border. It was built in anticipation of the outbreak of World War II. It stretched from the Sea of Marmara to the Black Sea.

== History ==
The Chief of the General Staff, Marshal Fevzi Çakmak, used the French Maginot Line as an example, and prepared plans for a fixed defensive line constructed of concrete and steel in Thrace. Fevzi Çakmak wanted to give this line of defense his last name. However, President Mustafa Kemal Atatürk opposed his plan and said:

War has always been fought on the ground, and it is won or lost on the ground. No matter how powerful the Çakmak Line is, its lifespan is as short as that of a battle. I do not bury my people's money under the ground for a whim.

After the death of Atatürk on November 10, 1938, İsmet İnönü became the president. During his presidency, and in anticipation of the outbreak of World War II, the General Staff established the Çakmak Line, as proposed by Çakmak, in the north of Kırklareli in order to resist any attack that might come from the Balkans on the Thrace border. In February 1941, the Germans invaded Bulgaria and reached the Turkish border. Thereupon, it was decided to draw the line to Çatalca. It was considered doubtful that this plan would be successful in the face of modern tactics used by the Germans.

The Çatalca Line was built in two lines starting from Durusu (Lake Terkos) to Büyükçekmece. On these lines, there are military bunkers, some of which are large and some of which are small. This position is connected to each other with wall wire and iron barriers. The construction of the Çakmak Line could not progress due to lack of cement and iron. Only 380,000 tons of cement could be produced annually, and these factories were found in places where they could be easily destroyed by enemy forces.

After Nazi Germany invaded Greece, the Çakmak Line lost its defensive function, as it was arranged against attacks from Bulgaria, whereas Germany could now invade Turkey via Western Thrace, through the lower part of the Meriç River. In response, İsmet İnönü ordered the Çakmak Line to be evacuated and withdrew the army to the Çatalca Line, since the Çakmak Line, which stretched along the northern border of Thrace, would no longer serve as a viable defensive position.

Although it never saw any use in combat, many soldiers lost their lives in the Çakmak Line due to the cold. In Çatalca, on the other hand, the people in the villages suffered and some of them even migrated to Anatolia. Today, the bunkers belonging to the Çakmak Line can still be seen in Eastern Thrace.
