= Army of Thrace =

The Army of Thrace (Greek: Στρατιά Θράκης) was a field army of the Hellenic Army in 1920–1922. It was created out of the National Defence Army Corps on 3 June 1920, and proceeded to occupy Eastern Thrace, defeating the local Ottoman forces led by Djafer Tayyar. Following defeat and evacuation of the Army of Asia Minor from Anatolia in August 1922, and the Armistice of Mudanya, the Army evacuated Eastern Thrace in October 1922. Along with the remnants of the Army of Asia Minor, it was reformed into the Army of the Evros in December 1922.

== Sources ==
- Theotikos, Lazaros (1969). Επιχειρήσεις Εις Θράκην (1919-1923) (in Greek). Athens: Hellenic Army History Directorate.
