= Incident at Petrich =

Minor military conflict between Bulgaria and Greece in October 1925

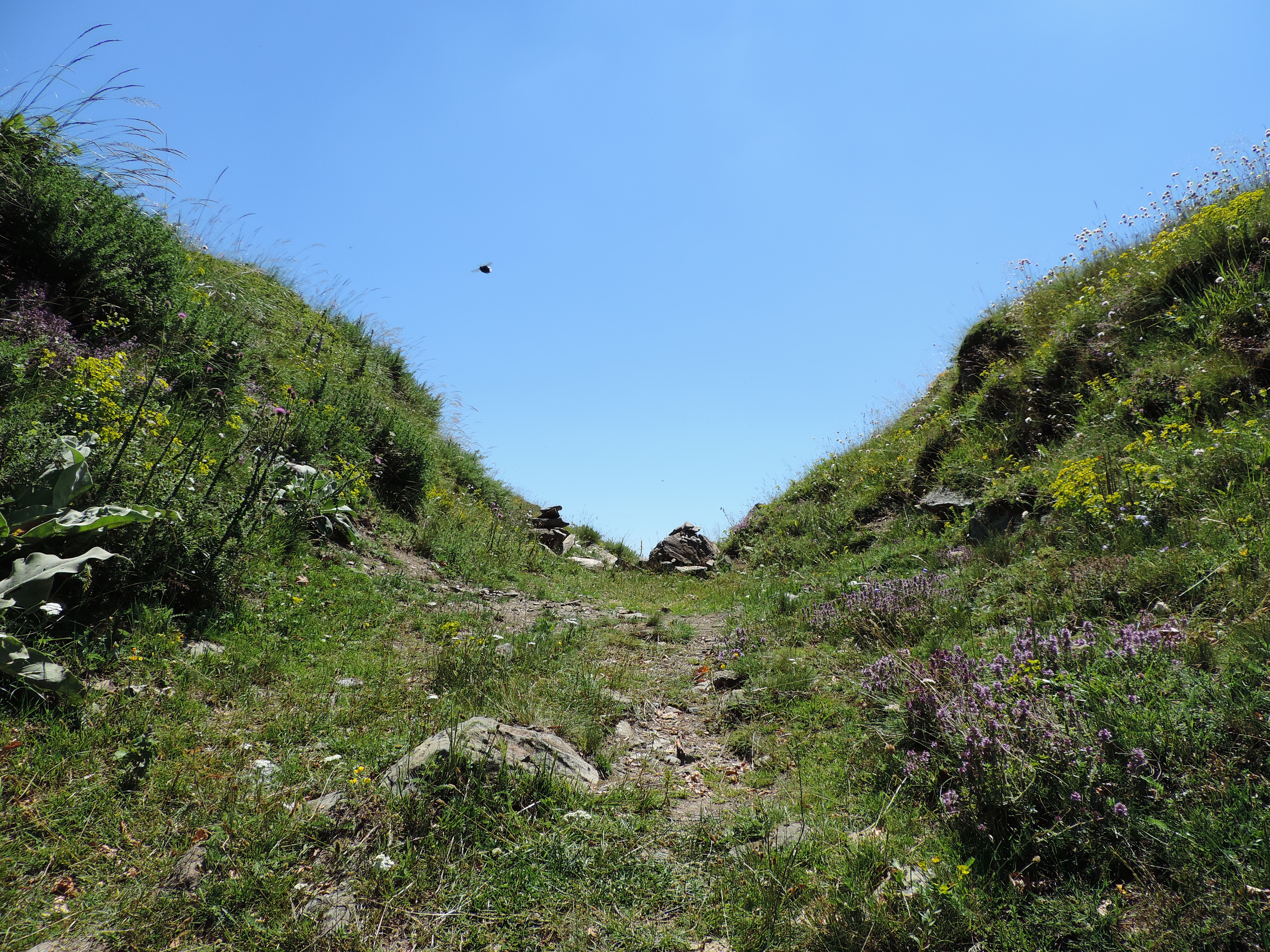
- Demir Kapia, where the original incident took place.
Date	19–29 October 1925 (10 Days)
Location	Petrich, Tsardom of Bulgaria
Result	Bulgarian diplomatic victory: Agreement between Bulgaria and Greece under the auspices of the League of Nations; Greece ordered to pay £45,000 in compensation
Territorial changes	Status quo ante bellum

Belligerents
Bulgaria: IMRO	Greece

Commanders and leaders
(Tsardom of Bulgaria (1908–1946)) Boris III (Tsardom of Bulgaria (1908–1946)) Aleksandar Tsankov; Ivan Mihailov	(Greece) Pavlos Kountouriotis (Greece) Theodoros Pangalos

Strength
(Tsardom of Bulgaria (1908–1946)) 10,000 soldiers	(Greece) 20,000 soldiers

Casualties and losses
(Tsardom of Bulgaria (1908–1946)) 50 dead (mostly civilians)	(Greece) 121 dead (Bulgarian claim)

The Incident at Petrich (Greek: Επεισόδιο του Πετριτσίου; Bulgarian: Петрички инцидент), or the War of the Stray Dog (Greek: Πόλεμος του αδέσποτου σκύλου; Bulgarian: Войната на бездомното куче), was a Greek–Bulgarian crisis in 1925 that resulted in a brief invasion of Bulgaria by Greece near the bulgarian border town of Petrich. The incident ended after a decision by the League of Nations.

== Background ==
Relations between Greece and Bulgaria had been strained since the early 20th century by their rivalry over the possession of Macedonia and later Western Thrace, which led to years of guerrilla warfare between various pro-Bulgarian Macedonian paramilitaries and the pro-Greek Macedonian Committee in the Macedonian Struggle (c. 1904-1908). Open conflict broke out between Greece and Bulgaria during the Second Balkan War (1913) and the First World War (1916–1918). The outcome of those conflicts was that Aegean Macedonia and Western Thrace came under Greek rule.

The significant Bulgarian populations in both regions caused them to become targets of Bulgarian irredentism throughout the interwar period. Two organisations, the Internal Macedonian Revolutionary Organisation (IMRO) and the Internal Thracian Revolutionary Organisation (ITRO), based in Bulgaria, launched raids and terrorist attacks into Greek and Yugoslav territory.

Petrich was the administrative centre of the Bulgarian-held Pirin Macedonia in which, during the early interwar years, the IMRO ran as a "state within a state".

In 1923, Bulgarian Prime Minister Aleksandar Stamboliyski was murdered by IMRO after his deposition in a coup d'état. His policies of rapprochement were deeply unpopular with the IMRO and nationalist factions in Bulgaria.

== Incident ==
Location of Belasitsa, where Bulgarian soldiers killed a Greek soldier and a captain.

There are two versions of how the incident started.

In the first version, the incident was started on October 18, 1925, by a Greek soldier running after his dog, which had strayed across the border from Greece at the pass Demir Kapia, 3 km west of Radomir on Belasitsa/Mpelles). It is thus sometimes referred to as the War of the Stray Dog. The border was guarded by Bulgarian sentries, one of whom shot the Greek soldier.

In the second version, according to Greek claims, the incident was caused on October 18 by Bulgarian soldiers, who crossed the Greek border, attacked a Greek outpost at Belasitsa and killed a Greek captain and a sentry.

== Reactions ==
Bulgaria explained that the firing was caused by a misunderstanding and expressed its regret.

In addition, the Bulgarian government proposed the formation of a mixed commission of Greek and Bulgarian officers to investigate the incident, but the Greek government declined as long as Bulgarian troops remained on Greek territory.

The Greek government, led by General Theodoros Pangalos, issued an ultimatum to Bulgaria of 48 hours to punish those responsible, an official apology, and two million French francs as compensation for the families of the victims.

On October 22, 1925, Greece sent soldiers into Bulgaria to occupy the town of Petrich with the objective of enforcing the demands.

== International intervention ==
Location of Petrich. To the south is Greece.

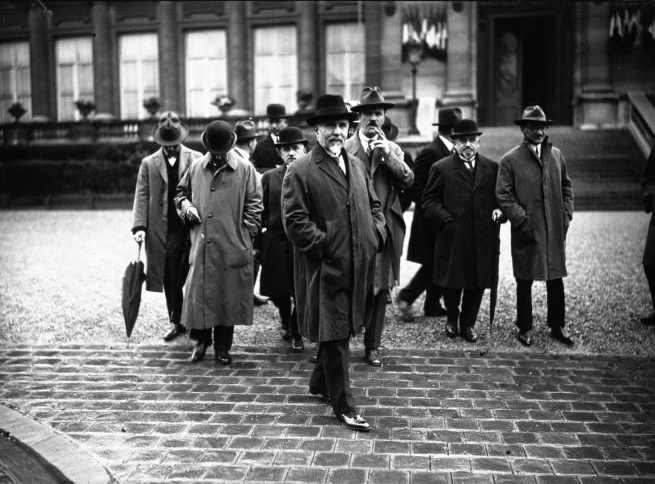
The Greek ambassador to France, Karapanos, during the discussions at the League of Nations over the Greco-Bulgarian conflict in 1925.

Fighting between Greek and Bulgarian forces started, and Bulgaria appealed to the League of Nations to intervene in the dispute. Some chetas of the Internal Macedonian Revolutionary Organization (IMRO), together with the sentries, organised defence lines against the Greeks near Petrich. Volunteers and war veterans from the whole region were summoned to join the resistance.

Greece made it clear that it was not interested in Bulgarian territory but demanded compensation.

Some contemporary international newspapers reported that the town of Petrich had been captured. However, Bulgarian sources claim that the town successfully resisted the Greek attacks. In reality, the League of Nations ordered an immediate ceasefire just hours before the Greek army was due to launch its attack on the town.

The League's final ruling included a ceasefire, the withdrawal of Greek troops from Bulgaria and the payment of £45,000 in compensation to Bulgaria.

Both countries accepted the decision, but Greece complained about the disparity between its treatment and Italy's treatment during the Corfu incident in 1923 in which Italy invaded and occupied the island and forced Greece to pay war restitutions. Athens decried that there was one rule in the League for the great powers like Italy and another for the smaller powers like Greece.

The League Council sent military attachés from France, Italy and the United Kingdom to report to it when the hostilities ceased and to observe the withdrawal of the Greek troops. The attachés also decided that the Bulgarians should not reoccupy the territory until a certain time had elapsed to prevent incidents.

The material and morale damage Greece had to pay was £45,000 (3 million Bulgarian levas) in compensation within two months, while Bulgaria compensated the victims' family.

There were 50 victims, mostly civilians, on the Bulgarian side. Bulgarian estimates for losses on the Greek side count 121.

== See also ==
- Serbo-Bulgarian War
- Tarlis incident
