= Constitutional dictatorship =

Dictatorship that is constitutionally granted in an emergency

A constitutional dictatorship is a form of government in which dictatorial powers stem from, and remain limited by, a constitution. The dictatorship usually is granted to someone in times of emergency, such as in Ancient Rome.

== History ==
=== Roman dictatorship ===
The Roman Republic made provision for a dictator who could govern unchecked for a stipulated period of time. Unlike other magistrates, a dictator was not subject to review of his actions at the conclusion of his term.

=== Examples of constitutionally granted powers ===
Abraham Lincoln, President of the United States during the American Civil War, exercised extraordinary powers to preserve the Union. Lincoln's dictatorial actions included directly ordering the arrest and detention of Confederate sympathizers and the suspension of the right to writs of habeas corpus. Thomas DiLorenzo viewed that Lincoln abused such power for his political advancement, and that such usage was potentially ruinous to liberty.

The Weimar Republic, which succeeded The German Empire after the First World War, adopted a constitutional provision that expressly enabled the president to rule by decree, without consultation with the legislative branch. That provision was used by Chancellor Adolf Hitler to consolidate his powers upon his selection by President Paul von Hindenburg.

US President Franklin D. Roosevelt also exercised extraordinary powers in response to the Great Depression and the Second World War. Roosevelt's actions included the closing of banks, and a moratorium on foreclosures. Later, meeting a perceived threat by Japanese nationals and Japanese-Americans, Roosevelt ordered their relocation to internment camps.

In the 21st century, John Yoo, attorney and legal theorist, has offered a theory of the unitary executive for massive authority of the US president, in his capacity as commander-in-chief of the armed forces. Yoo provided the intellectual foundation for many of the actions undertaken by the George W. Bush administration in the aftermath of the attacks of September 11, 2001.

== See also ==
- Rule by decree
- Emergency powers
- Constitutional monarchy
- Democratic backsliding
