= 1925 Greek coup d'état =

1925 Greek coup d’état
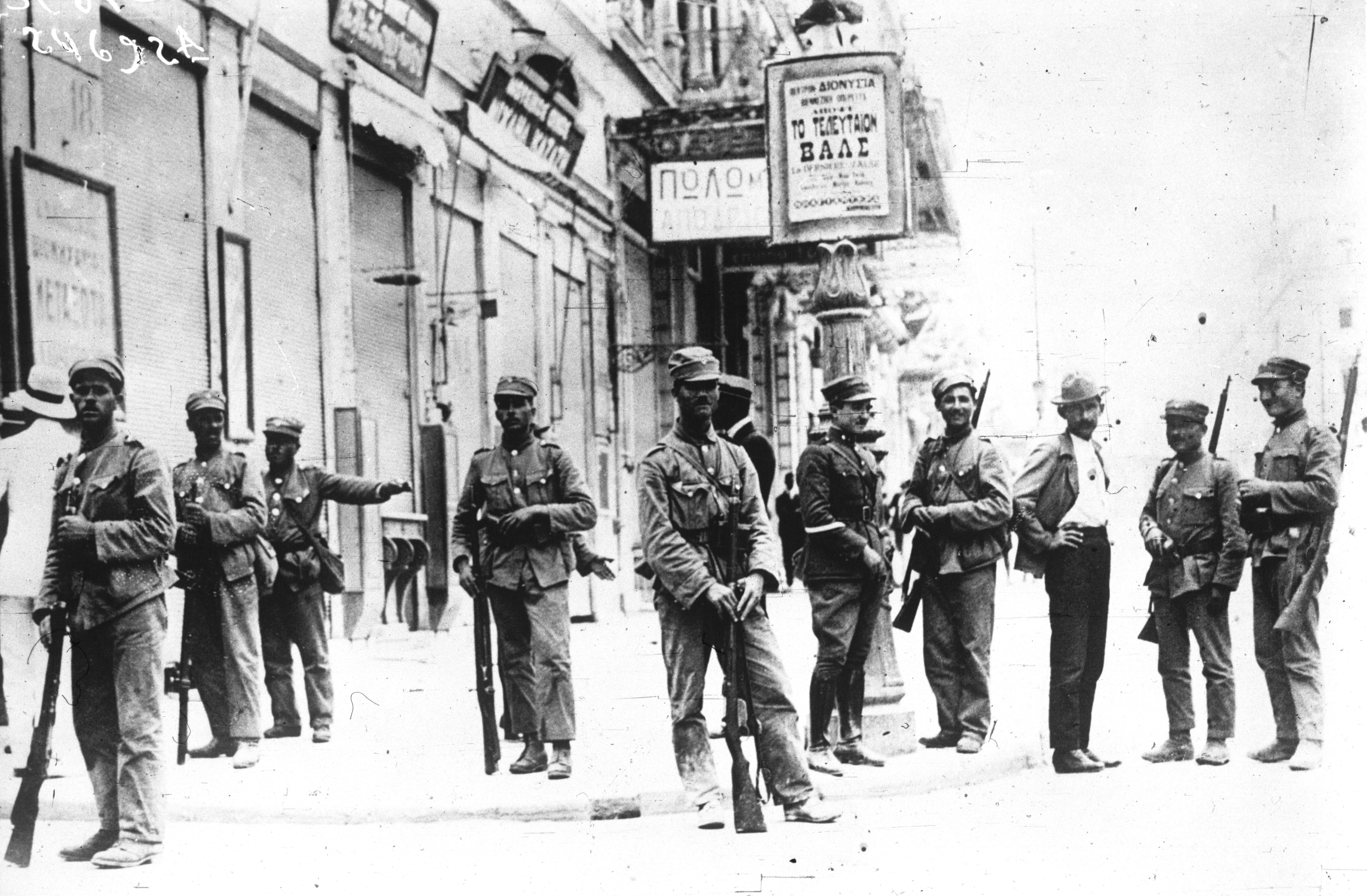
- Greek troops in the streets the day the coup occurred.
- Date: 24–25 June 1925
- Location: Greece
- Participants: Theodore Pangalos
- Outcome: Theodore Pangalos becomes the dictator of Greece

The 1925 Greek coup d’état was a coup in Greece that took place on Thursday, 25 June 1925. It was led by General Theodore Pangalos. He quickly rose to power and by the next day, he became the dictator of Greece.

== Background ==
In late 1922, the Greco-Turkish War was occurring across Anatolia, and the Burning of Smyrna had caused much political unrest in Greece. Constantine I was forced to resign, and eventually his son George took power of Greece.

Many of the people in Greece were furious that they had lost the war, so they led a revolution in Athens under the leadership of Nikolaos Plastiras, and the revolution was declared as a Revolutionary Committee.

== Coup ==
On the evening of June 24, Pangalos was informed that his arrest was imminent. He immediately ordered the initiated officers to occupy strategic positions. The movement initially took place in the military hospital, where Colonel Dertilis was detained. At Thessaloniki, the fleet joined the movement, while the battleship Averof was captured by initiated naval officers. Afterwards, Kavala followed. Soon, Thrace and Macedonia were controlled by the movement leaders.
