= Horace Rumbold =

Horace Rumbold may refer to:

- Sir Horace Rumbold, 8th Baronet (1829–1913), British diplomat
- Sir Horace Rumbold, 9th Baronet (1869–1941), British diplomat

The name should not be confused with the fictional character Horace Rumpole
