= Georgios Polymenakos =

Greek Army officer (1859–1942)

- Γεώργιος Πολυμενάκος
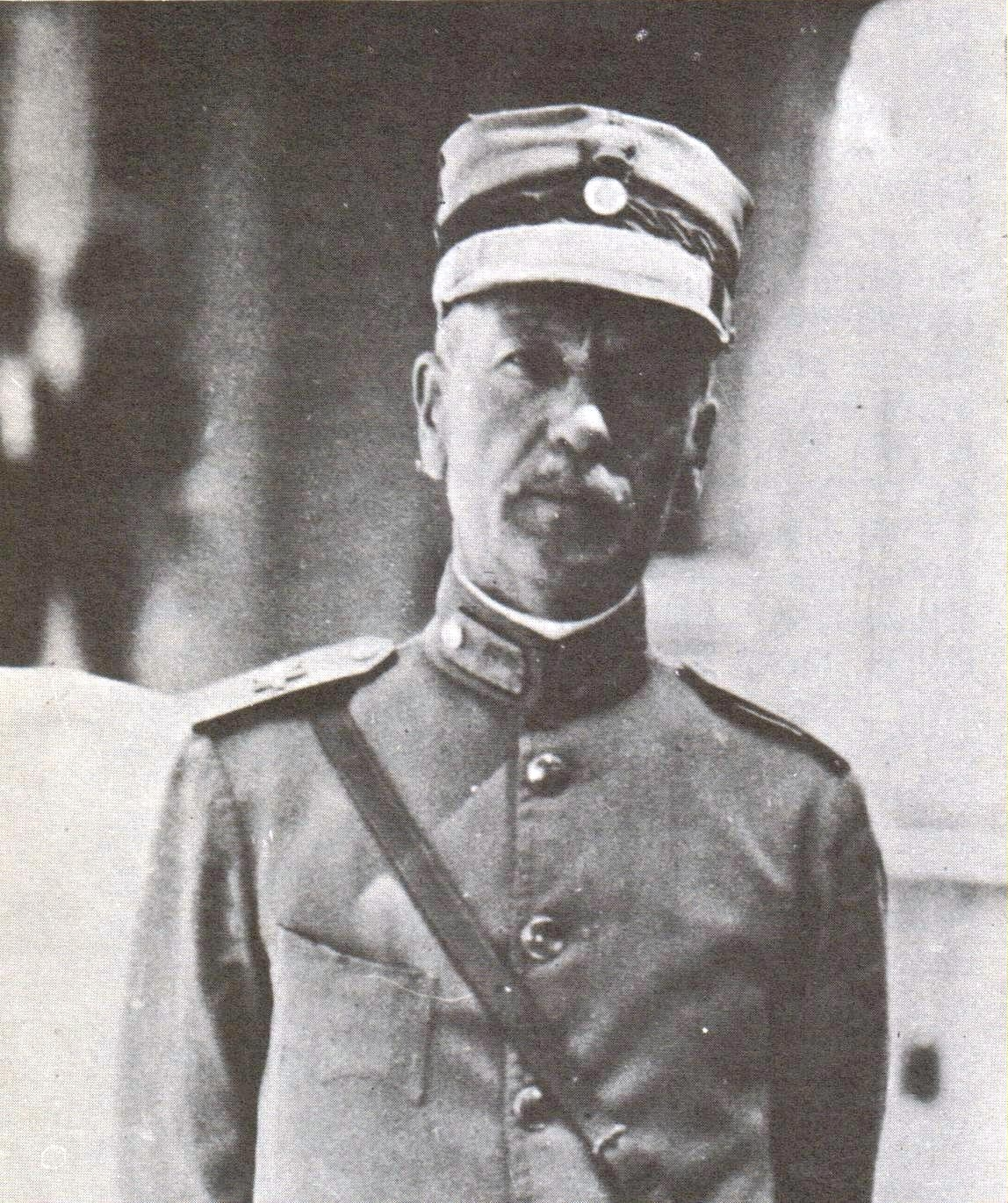
- Georgios Polymenakos c. 1921
- Born: 1 July 1859; Areopolis, Kingdom of Greece
- Died: 1942 (aged 82–83); Athens, Hellenic State
- Military career
- Allegiance: Kingdom of Greece (1880–1923); Second Hellenic Republic (1927)
- Branch: Hellenic Army
- Service years: 1880–1927
- Rank: Lieutenant General
- Commands: III Army Corps; Army of Asia Minor
- Conflicts: Greco-Turkish War (1897); First Balkan War; Second Balkan War; First World War; Greco-Turkish War (1919–1922)

Georgios Polymenakos (Greek: Γεώργιος Πολυμενάκος, 1859–1942) was a Greek military officer, notable for his role in the Balkan Wars and the Greco-Turkish War (1919–1922).

== Biography ==
Born in Areopolis on 1 July 1859, he enlisted in the Hellenic Army on 21 June 1880. Marked out for further promotion, he entered the NCO Academy and graduated on 22 September 1885 as an Infantry 2nd Lieutenant. Promoted to Lieutenant, he fought in the Greco-Turkish War of 1897. In the First Balkan War he commanded the 15th Infantry Regiment, which he led in Epirus, up to the Battle of Bizani. After the end of the war, the regiment was transferred to Macedonia, where it was subordinated to the 7th Infantry Division. Polymenakos continued as regimental commander during the Second Balkan War against Bulgaria, seeing action at Nevrokop, Predel - Han, and Mehomia.

A moderate monarchist, he was dismissed from the army by the Venizelists in 1917 as a result of the National Schism, but was recommissioned following the Venizelist electoral defeat in November 1920. In 1921 he commanded the III Army Corps in Anatolia, and he led it in the Greek summer offensive and the advance towards the Sakarya River. Promoted to lieutenant general, in late 1921 he was appointed commander of the Northern Group of Divisions around Eskişehir. In May 1922, he was considered for the post of commander-in-chief of the Army of Asia Minor after the retirement of Lt. General Anastasios Papoulas, but the monarchist government mistrusted his political credentials and passed him over in favour of Georgios Hatzianestis. In June, despite the imminent Turkish offensive, he asked to be removed from his position due to his disagreements with the government on the pursuit of the war.

After the Greek defeat and collapse in August 1922, Hatzianestis resigned. In the general chaos that followed, the Greek government appointed Lt. General Nikolaos Trikoupis in his place, only to be informed that he had already been taken captive by the Turks. Thus Polymenakos was appointed commander-in-chief on 24 August 1922, having barely enough time to lead the evacuation of the last remnants of the Greek forces from Anatolia. Following the September 1922 Revolution, he went into retirement along with several other pro-monarchist officers in November 1923.

He was recalled for a few months to active duty in 1927, to participate in a council to supervise the re-admission of former monarchist officers into the Army.

He died in Athens in 1942.

Military offices
Preceded by Lt. General Georgios Hatzianestis	Commander-in-chief of the Army of Asia Minor; 24 August – 11 September 1922	Greek evacuation from Asia Minor and 11 September 1922 Revolution
