= Turkish War of Independence =

Interwar conflict in Turkey, 1919–1923

- Part of the Revolutions of 1917–1923 in the aftermath of World War I
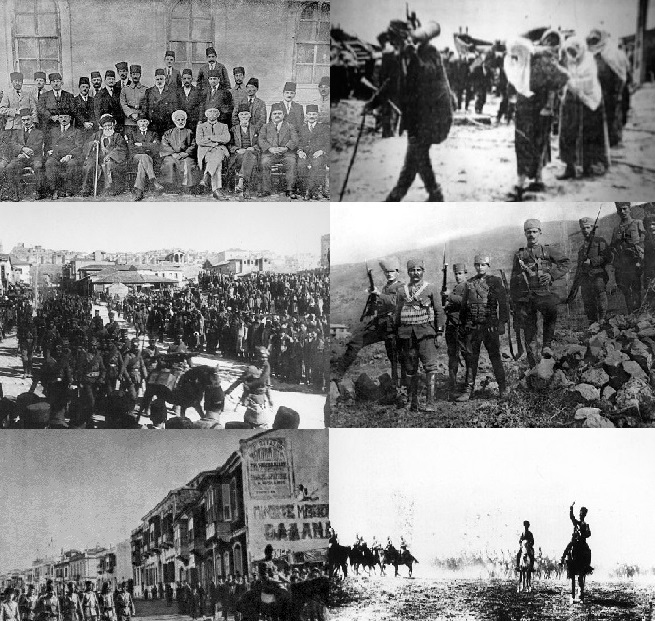
- Clockwise from top left: Delegation gathered in Sivas Congress to determine the objectives of the Turkish National Movement; Turkish civilians carrying ammunition to the front; Kuva-yi Milliye infantry; Turkish horse cavalry in chase; Turkish Army's capture of Smyrna; troops in Ankara's Ulus Square preparing to leave for the front.
| Date | 15 May 1919 – 11 October 1922 (3 years, 4 months, 3 weeks and 5 days) |
| Location | Anatolia, southwestern Caucasus, Upper Mesopotamia, and East Thrace |
| Result | Turkish victory |
| Territorial changes | Establishment of the Republic of Turkey |

Belligerents
| Turkish National Movement: Ankara Government (1919–1920; 1920–1923) Also: Azerbaijan (1918–1920); Aras Republic (1918–1919); Iğdır National Republic (1918–1920); Provisional Kars Government (1918–1919); Green Army (1919–1920); Oltu Council Government (1919–1920); Kurdistan (1919; 1921–1923); (Kurdistan Region) Kurdish volunteers | Allied Powers: Greece France (until 1921) (Note: The Treaty of Ankara was signed in 1921 and the Franco-Turkish War thus ended. The French troops remained in Constantinople with the other Allied troops.): French West Africa; Armenian Legion; Algeria; Morocco; French Tunisia; British Empire (Note: The United Kingdom occupied Constantinople, then fought directly against Turkish irregular forces in the Greek Summer Offensive with the Greek troops. (Kuva-yi Milliye came under command of the Grand National Assembly after 4 September 1920.) However, after this the United Kingdom would not take part in any more major fighting. Moreover, the British troops occupied several towns in Turkey such as Mudanya. Naval landing forces had tried to capture Mudanya as early as 25 June 1920, but stubborn Turkish resistance inflicted casualties on British forces and forced them to withdraw. There were many instances of successful delaying operations of small Turkish irregular forces against numerical superior enemy troops. The United Kingdom, which also fought diplomatically against the Turkish National Movement, came to the brink of a great war in September 1922 (Chanak Crisis).): United Kingdom; India; Armenia (in 1920) Istanbul Government^{[e]} (in 1920): Other pro-Istanbul rebels; Italy (Note: Italy occupied Constantinople and a part of southwestern Anatolia but never fought the Turkish army directly. During its occupation Italian troops protected Turkish civilians, who were living in the areas occupied by the Italian army, from Greek troops and accepted Turkish refugees who had to flee from the regions invaded by the Greek army. In July 1921, Italy began to withdraw its troops from southwestern Anatolia.) Georgia (in 1921) Separatists: Pontic Greek guerrillas; Kurdish rebels; Assyrian rebels; Green Army (1920–1921) |

Commanders and leaders
| Mustafa Kemal Pasha; Mustafa Fevzi Pasha; Mustafa İsmet Pasha; Kâzım Karabekir Pasha; Fahrettin Pasha; Ali Fuat Pasha; Refet Pasha; Nureddin Pasha; Ali İhsan Pasha; Osman the Lame; Ethem the Circassian (until 1920) | (Kingdom of Greece) Eleftherios Venizelos (Kingdom of Greece) Leonidas Paraskevopoulos (Kingdom of Greece) Constantine I (Kingdom of Greece) Dimitrios Gounaris (executed) (Kingdom of Greece) Anastasios Papoulas (Kingdom of Greece) Georgios Hatzianestis (executed) (French Third Republic) Henri Gouraud (First Republic of Armenia) Drastamat Kanayan (First Republic of Armenia) Movses Silikyan (United Kingdom of Great Britain and Ireland) Sir George Milne Mehmed VI; Damat Ferid Pasha (Ottoman Empire) Süleyman Şefik Pasha (Ottoman Empire) Anzavur Ahmed Pasha (executed); Ethem the Circassian Alişer |

Strength
| May 1919: 35,000; November 1920: 86,000 (creation of regular army); August 1922: 271,000 (Note: In August 1922 the Turkish Army formed 23 infantry divisions and 6 cavalry divisions. Equivalent to 24 infantry divisions and 7 cavalry divisions, if the additional 3 infantry regiments, 5 undersized border regiments, 1 cavalry brigade and 3 cavalry regiments are included (271,403 men total). The troops were distributed in Anatolia as follows: Eastern Front: 2 infantry divisions, 1 cavalry division, Erzurum and Kars fortified areas and 5 border regiments (29,514 men); El-Cezire front (southeastern Anatolia, eastern region of the river Euphrates): 1 infantry division and 2 cavalry regiments (10,447 men); Central Army area: 1 infantry division and 1 cavalry brigade (10,000 men); Adana command: 2 battalions (500 men); Gaziantep area: 1 infantry regiment and 1 cavalry regiment (1,000 men); Interior region units and institutions: 12,000 men; Western Front: 18 infantry divisions and 5 cavalry divisions, if the independent brigade and regiments are included, 19 infantry divisions and 5.5 cavalry divisions (207,942 men).) | (Kingdom of Greece) Dec. 1919: 80,000; 1922: 200,000–250,000 (French Third Republic) 60,000 (United Kingdom of Great Britain and Ireland) 30,000 (First Republic of Armenia) 20,000 (Ottoman Empire) 7,000 (at peak) (Democratic Republic of Georgia) 3,000 |

Casualties and losses
| 13,000 killed 22,690 died of disease 5,362 died of wounds or other non-combat causes 35,000 wounded 7,000 prisoners (Note: Greece took 22,071 military and civilian prisoners. Of these were 520 officers and 6,002 soldiers. During the prisoner exchange in 1923, 329 officers, 6,002 soldiers and 9,410 civilian prisoners arrived in Turkey. The remaining 6,330, mostly civilian prisoners, presumably died in Greek captivity.) Total: 83,052 casualties | Greece: 19,362 killed 4,878 died outside of combat 48,880 wounded 18,095 missing c. 13,740 prisoners France: <3,590 killed <701 prisoners (Note: (these numbers include Franco-Syrian War casualties)); Armenia: 1,100+ killed 3,000+ prisoners Kurdish rebels: 500 killed 532 prisoners Georgia: 84 killed British Empire: 4+ killed 35+ wounded 1+ missing 1+ prisoners Istanbul Government: Unknown killed, wounded and missing 43 captured Total: 117,255+ casualties |
- 264,000 Greek civilians killed 60,000–250,000 Armenian civilians killed 15,000+ Turkish civilians killed in the Western Front; 30,000+ buildings and 250+ villages burnt to the ground by the Hellenic Army and Greek/Armenian rebels.

The Turkish War of Independence (Note: Turkish: Kurtuluş Savaşı "War of Liberation", also known figuratively as İstiklâl Harbi "Independence War" or Millî Mücadele "National Struggle") (15 May 1919 – 24 July 1923) was a series of military campaigns and a revolution waged by the Turkish National Movement, after the Ottoman Empire was occupied and partitioned following its defeat in World War I. The conflict was between the Turkish Nationalists and the Allied and separatist forces over the application of Wilsonian principles, especially self-determination, in post-World War I Anatolia and eastern Thrace. The revolution concluded the collapse of the Ottoman Empire and the Eastern question, ending the Ottoman sultanate and the Ottoman caliphate, and established the Republic of Turkey. After leading the nationalists to victory, Mustafa Kemal Atatürk introduced revolutionary reforms as president of the new republic.

While World War I ended for the Ottomans with the Armistice of Mudros, the Allies continued occupying land per the Sykes–Picot Agreement, and to facilitate the prosecution of former members of the Committee of Union and Progress and those involved in the Armenian genocide. Several Ottoman commanders therefore refused orders from the Ottoman government to disband their forces. In an atmosphere of turmoil, Sultan Mehmed VI dispatched general Mustafa Kemal Pasha (later Atatürk), to restore order; however, he became an enabler and leader of Turkish Nationalist resistance. In an attempt to establish control over the power vacuum in Anatolia, the Allies agreed to launch a Greek force to occupy Smyrna (İzmir), inflaming sectarian tensions and beginning the Turkish War of Independence. A nationalist counter government led by Mustafa Kemal was established in Ankara when it became clear the Ottoman government was appeasing the Allies. The Allies pressured the Ottoman "Istanbul government" to suspend the Constitution, Parliament, and sign the Treaty of Sèvres, a treaty unfavorable to Turkish interests that the "Ankara government" declared illegal.

Turkish forces defeated the French in the south, and remobilized army units went on to partition Armenia with the Bolsheviks, resulting in the Treaty of Kars (1921). The Western Front is known as the Greco-Turkish War (1919–1922). The regular army, organized from militia forces under İsmet Pasha (İnönü), fought the Greeks to a standstill in the First and Second Battles of İnönü, but was checked at the Battle of Aslıhanlar–Dumlupınar. The Greeks emerged victorious in the Battle of Kütahya-Eskişehir and drove on Ankara. The Turks checked their advance in the Battle of Sakarya, creating a year-long stalemate which culminated in the 1922 Constantinople crisis. The Turks counter-attacked in the Great Offensive, which expelled Greek forces. The war ended with the recapture of İzmir, the Chanak crisis and another armistice in Mudanya.

The Grand National Assembly in Ankara was recognized as the legitimate Turkish government, which signed the Treaty of Lausanne, a treaty more favorable to Turkey than Sèvres. The Allies evacuated Anatolia and eastern Thrace, the Ottoman government was overthrown, the monarchy abolished, and the Grand National Assembly of Turkey declared the Republic of Turkey on 29 October 1923. With the war, a population exchange between Greece and Turkey, the partitioning of the Ottoman Empire, and the abolition of the sultanate, the Ottoman era came to an end, and with Atatürk's reforms, the Turks created the secular nation of Turkey. Turkey's demographics were significantly affected by the Armenian genocide and the Greek genocide. The Turkish Nationalist Movement carried out massacres and deportations to eliminate native Christian populations—a continuation of the Armenian genocide and other ethnic cleansing during World War I. The historic Christian presence in Anatolia was largely destroyed; Muslims went from 80% to 98% of the population.

== Background ==
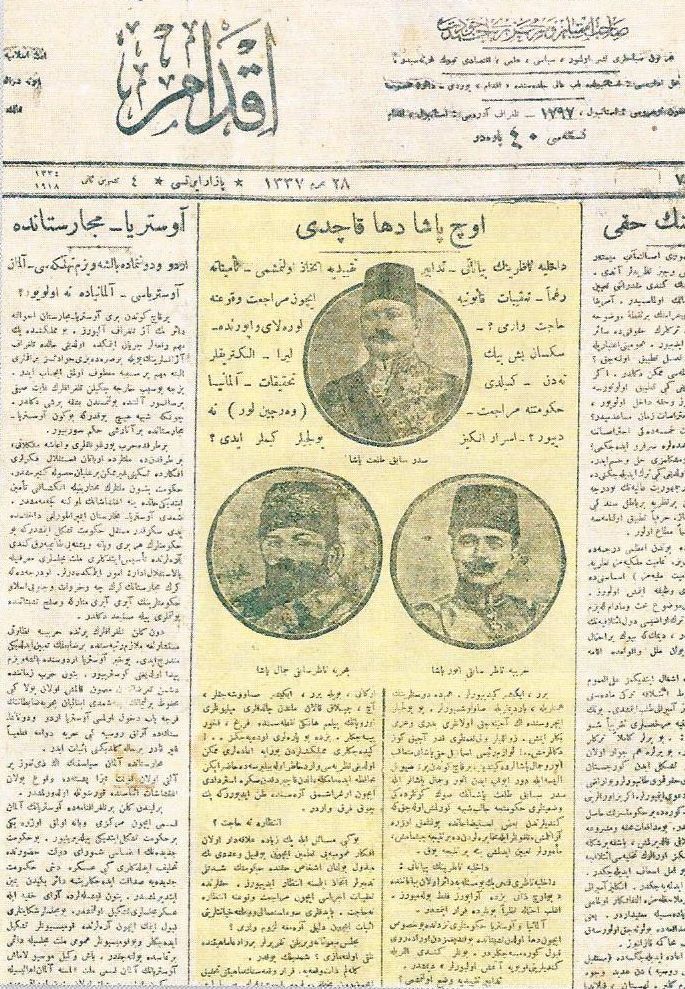
Front page of İkdam on 4 November 1918, "The Three Pashas Escaped"

Following the chaotic politics of the Second Constitutional Era, the Ottoman Empire came under the control of the Committee of Union and Progress in a coup in 1913, and then further consolidated its control after the assassination of Mahmud Shevket Pasha. Founded as a radical revolutionary group seeking to prevent a collapse of the Ottoman Empire, by the eve of World War I it decided that the solution was to implement nationalist and centralizing policies. The CUP reacted to the losses of land and the expulsion of Muslims from the Balkan Wars by turning even more nationalistic. Part of its effort to consolidate power was to proscribe and exile opposition politicians from the Freedom and Accord Party to remote Sinop.

The Unionists brought the Ottoman Empire into World War I on the side of Germany and Austria-Hungary, during which a genocidal campaign was waged against Ottoman Christians, namely Armenians, Pontic Greeks, and Assyrians. It was based on an alleged conspiracy that the three groups would rebel on the side of the Allies, so collective punishment was applied. A similar suspicion and suppression from the Turkish nationalist government was directed towards the Arab and Kurdish populations, leading to localized rebellions. The Entente powers reacted to these developments by charging the CUP leaders, commonly known as the Three Pashas, with "crimes against humanity" and threatened accountability. They also had imperialist ambitions on Ottoman territory, with correspondence over a post-war settlement in the Ottoman Empire being leaked to the press as the Sykes–Picot Agreement. Russia's exit from World War I and descent into civil war was driven in part by the Ottoman closure of the Turkish straits to goods bound for Russia. A new imperative was given to the Entente powers to knock the Ottoman Empire out of the war and restart the Eastern Front.

World War I would be the nail in the coffin of Ottomanism, an imperialist and multicultural nationalism. Mistreatment of non-Turk groups after 1913, and the general context of great socio-political upheaval that occurred in the aftermath of World War I, meant many minorities now wished to divorce their future from imperialism to form futures of their own by separating into (often republican) nation-states. Due to the Turkish nationalist policies pursued by the CUP against Ottoman Christians by 1918 the Ottoman Empire held control over a mostly homogeneous land of Muslims from eastern Thrace to the Persian border. These included mostly Turks, as well as Kurds, Circassians, and Muhacir groups from Rumeli. Most Muslim Arabs were now outside of the Ottoman Empire and under Allied occupation, with some "imperialists" still loyal to the Ottoman Sultanate-Caliphate, and others wishing for independence or Allied protection under a League of Nations mandate. Sizable Greek and Armenian minorities remained within its borders, and most of these communities no longer wished to remain under the Empire.

=== Conclusion of World War I ===
In the summer months of 1918, the leaders of the Central Powers realized that the Great War was lost, including the Ottomans. Almost simultaneously, the Palestinian Front and then the Macedonian Front collapsed. The sudden decision by Bulgaria to sign an armistice cut communications from Constantinople (İstanbul) to Vienna and Berlin, and opened the undefended Ottoman capital to Entente attack. With the major fronts crumbling, Unionist Grand Vizier Talât Pasha intended to sign an armistice, and resigned on 8 October 1918 so that a new government would receive less harsh armistice terms. The Armistice of Mudros was signed on 30 October 1918, ending World War I for the Ottoman Empire. Three days later, the Committee of Union and Progress (CUP)—which governed the Ottoman Empire as a one-party state since 1913—held its last congress, where it was decided the party would be dissolved. Talât, Enver Pasha, Cemal Pasha, Doctor Nâzım, Bahaeddin Şakir, and three other high-ranking members of the CUP escaped the Ottoman Empire on a German torpedo boat later that night, plunging the country into a power vacuum. With the fall of the CUP: the following factions hoped to take advantage of the power vacuum in the Ottoman Empire:

- The Palace: With Sultan Mehmed V's death earlier in the summer of 1918, Mehmed VI was girded with the sword of Osman. Unlike his half-brother, the new Sultan wished to reassert the monarchy as a center of power in the Ottoman Empire. In the following conflict, his singular goal was to safeguard the interests of the royal family.
- The Liberals: The Freedom and Accord Party would be reestablished, and attempt to salvage the Ottoman Empire's diplomatic position by cooperating with Allied demands, though their detractors accused them of appeasement. Like its first period of operation from 1911–1913, Freedom and Accord Party again fell into infighting, and would be defunct by the summer of 1919. One of its old leaders, Damat Ferid Pasha, would form a strong alliance with the Sultan, though he did not rejoin his party.
- The Allies: Britain and France had several goals. Both countries hoped to carve up the Ottoman Empire with mandates and spheres of influence. Britain specifically focused on facilitating war crimes trials to try Ottoman war criminals. Their immediate short-term goal was to secure supply lines to assist the Whites in the Russian Civil War. Right after the armistice, a de facto Allied occupation began in Constantinople. Some Ottoman intelligentsia hoped the Empire could become a mandate under the United States, an upstart and trustworthy power that recently proclaimed the Fourteen Points.
- Ethnic minorities: Ottoman Greeks hoped to join Greece and Armenians hoped to form a new Armenian Republic. Pontic Greeks hoped to establish their own state. In April 1919 they renounced their allegiance to the Ottoman state through their patriarchs. Some Kurds hoped to establish an autonomous Kurdish state, but their claims overlapped with Assyrian nationalists.
- Unionists: Though their leaders had escaped the country and the CUP as a whole was discredited and dissolved as an organization, ex-Unionists still controlled parliament, the army, police, post and telegraph, bureaucracy, and more. They were the target of purges which started by 1919, but the Allies and the Liberals did not have the resources or manpower to go after all of them. They would eventually coalesce around Mustafa Kemal Pasha (Atatürk).

== Prelude: October 1918 – May 1919 ==
=== Armistice of Mudros and occupation ===
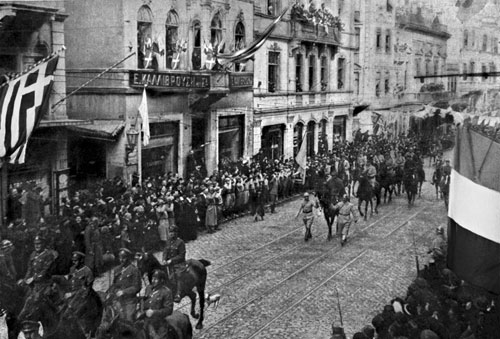
Allied occupation troops marching at the Grande Rue de Péra (İstiklal Avenue)

On 30 October 1918, the Armistice of Mudros was signed between the Ottoman Empire and the Allies of World War I, bringing hostilities in the Middle Eastern theatre of World War I to an end. The Ottoman Army was to demobilize, its navy and air force handed to the Allies, and occupied territory in the Caucasus and Persia to be evacuated. Critically, Article VII granted the Allies the right to occupy forts controlling the Turkish Straits and the vague right to occupy "in case of disorder" any territory if there were a threat to security. The clause relating to the occupation of the straits was meant to secure a Southern Russian intervention force, while the rest of the article was used to allow for Allied controlled peace-keeping forces. There was also a hope to follow through punishing local actors that carried out exterminatory orders from the CUP government against Armenian Ottomans. For now, the House of Osman escaped the fates of the Hohenzollerns, Habsburgs, and Romanovs to continue ruling their empire, though at the cost of its remaining sovereignty.

The armistice was signed because the Ottoman Empire had been defeated in important fronts, but the military was intact and retreated in good order. Unlike other Central Powers, the Allies did not mandate an abdication of the imperial family as a condition for peace, nor did they request the Ottoman Army to dissolve its general staff. Though the army suffered from mass desertion throughout the war which led to banditry, there was no threat of mutiny or revolutions like in Germany, Austria-Hungary, or Russia. This is despite famine and economic collapse that was brought on by the extreme levels of mobilization, destruction from the war, disease, and mass murder since 1914.

On 13 November 1918, a French brigade entered Constantinople to begin a de facto occupation of the Ottoman capital and its immediate dependencies. This was followed by a fleet consisting of British, French, Italian and Greek ships deploying soldiers on the ground the next day, totaling 50,000 troops in Constantinople. The Allied Powers stated that the occupation was temporary and its purpose was to protect the monarchy, the caliphate and the minorities. Somerset Arthur Gough-Calthorpe—the British signatory of the Mudros Armistice—stated the Triple Entente's public position that they had no intention to dismantle the Ottoman government or place it under military occupation by "occupying Constantinople". However, dismantling the government and partitioning the Ottoman Empire among the Allied nations had been an objective of the Entente since the start of WWI.

A wave of seizures took place in the rest of the country in the following months. Questionably citing Article VII, the British occupied Mosul, claiming that Christian civilians in Mosul and Zakho were killed en masse by the Turkish troops. In the Caucasus, Britain established a presence in Menshevik Georgia and the Lori and Aras valleys as peace-keepers. On 14 November, joint Franco-Greek occupation was established in the town of Uzunköprü in eastern Thrace as well as the railway axis until the train station of Hadımköy on the outskirts of Constantinople. On 1 December, British troops based in Syria occupied Kilis, Marash, Urfa and Birecik. Beginning in December, French troops began successive seizures of the province of Adana, including the towns of Antioch, Mersin, Tarsus, Ceyhan, Adana, Osmaniye, and İslâhiye, incorporating the area into the Occupied Enemy Territory Administration North while French forces embarked by gunboats and sent troops to the Black Sea ports of Zonguldak and Karadeniz Ereğli, commanding Turkey's coal-mining region. These continued seizures of land prompted Ottoman commanders to refuse demobilization and prepare for the resumption of war.

=== Prelude to resistance ===
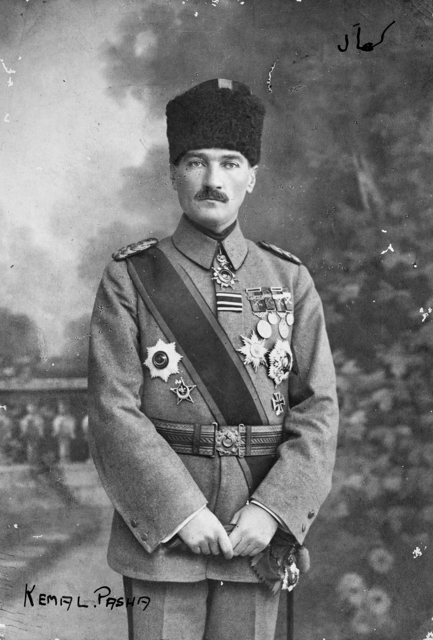
Mustafa Kemal Pasha in 1918, then an Ottoman army general

The British similarly asked Mustafa Kemal Pasha (Atatürk) to turn over the port of Alexandretta (İskenderun), which he reluctantly did, following which he was recalled to Constantinople. He made sure to distribute weapons to the population to prevent them from falling into the hands of Allied forces. Some of these weapons were smuggled to the east by members of Karakol, a successor to the CUP's Special Organization, to be used in case resistance was necessary in Anatolia. Many Ottoman officials participated in efforts to conceal from the occupying authorities details of the burgeoning independence movement spreading throughout Anatolia.

Other commanders began refusing orders from the Ottoman government and the Allied powers. After Mustafa Kemal Pasha returned to Constantinople, Ali Fuat Pasha (Cebesoy) brought XX Corps under his command. He marched first to Konya and then to Ankara to organise resistance groups, such as the Circassian çetes he assembled with guerilla leader Çerkes Ethem. Meanwhile, Kâzım Karabekir Pasha refused to surrender his intact and powerful XV Corps in Erzurum. Evacuating from the Caucusus, puppet republics and Muslim militia groups were established in the army's wake to hamper the consolidation of the new Armenian state. Elsewhere in the country, regional nationalist resistance organizations known as Şûrâs –meaning "councils", not unlike soviets in revolutionary Russia– were founded, most incorporating themselves into the Defence of National Rights movement which protested continued Allied occupation and appeasement by the Sublime Porte.

== The Armistice era ==
=== Politics of de-Ittihadification ===
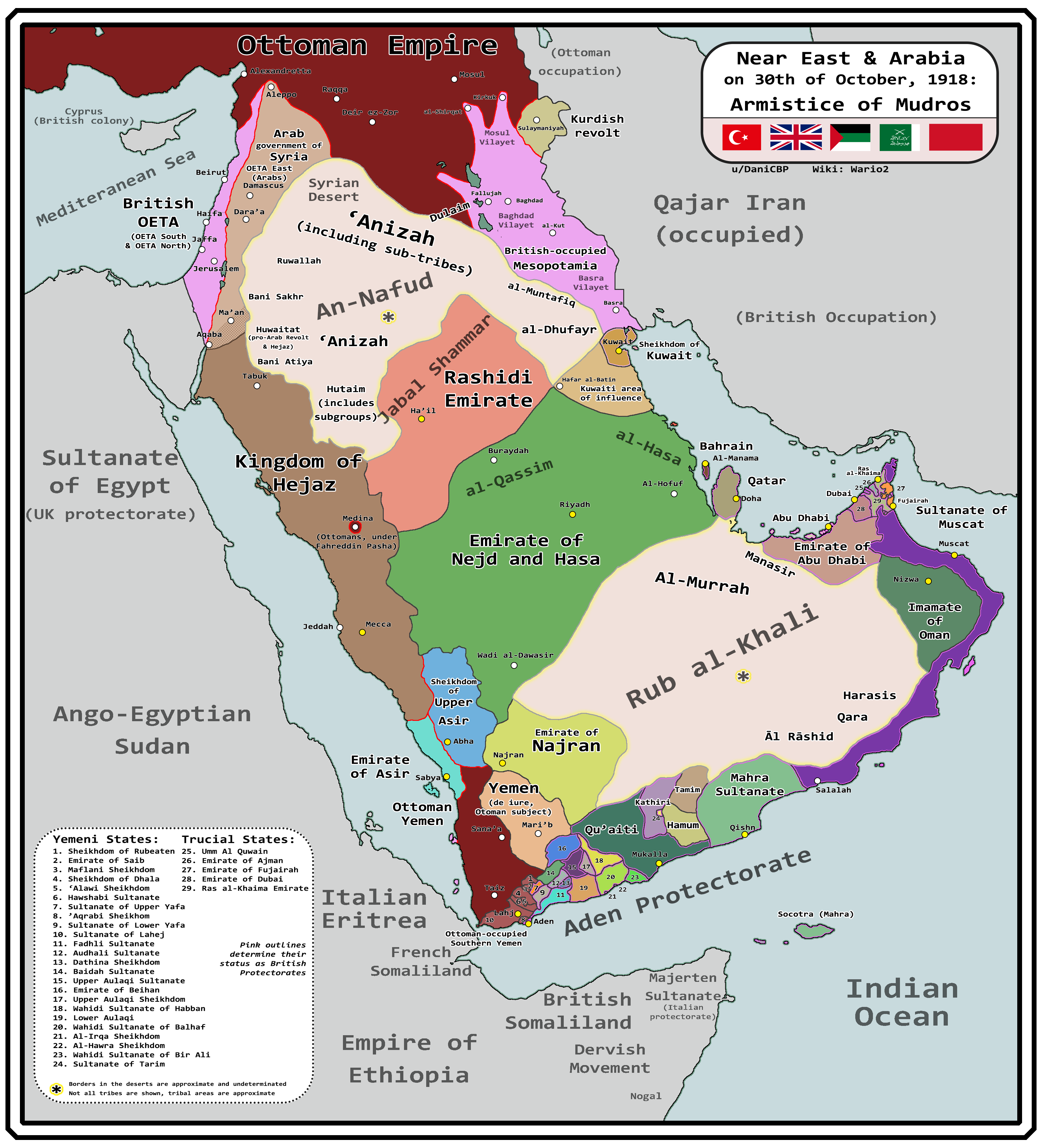
Near East areas of control and front lines upon the Armistice of Mudros

Following the occupation of Constantinople, Mehmed VI Vahdettin dissolved the Chamber of Deputies which was dominated by Unionists elected back in 1914, promising elections for the next year. Vahdettin just ascended to the throne only months earlier with the death of Mehmed V Reşâd. He was disgusted with the policies of the CUP, and wished to be a more assertive sovereign than his diseased half brother. Greek and Armenian Ottomans declared the termination of their relationship with the Ottoman Empire through their respective patriarchates, and refused to partake in any future election. With the collapse of the CUP and its censorship regime, an outpouring of condemnation against the party came from all parts of Ottoman media.

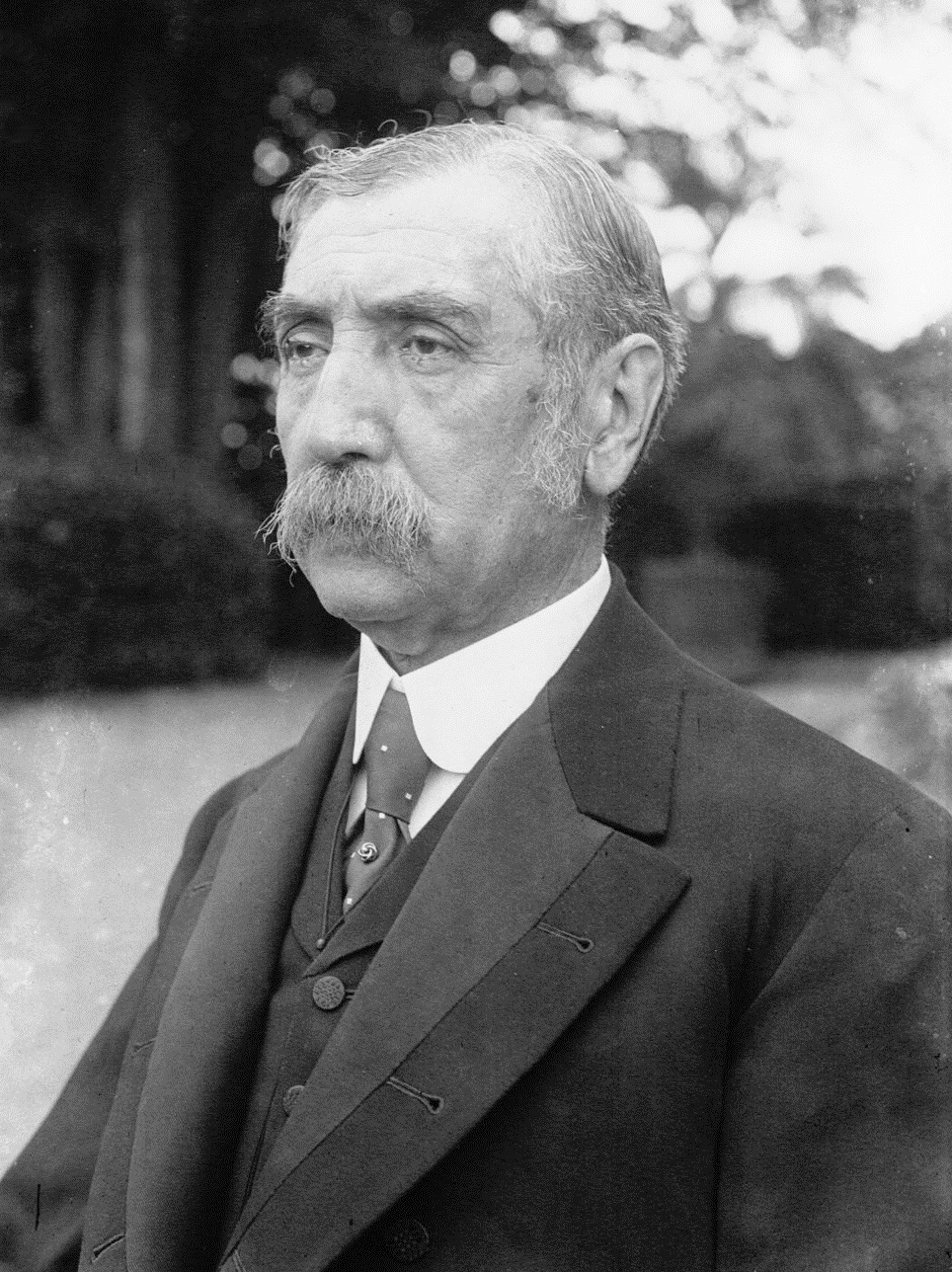
Grand Vizier Ferid Pasha, damat of the royal family

A general amnesty was soon issued, allowing the exiled and imprisoned dissidents persecuted by the CUP to return to Constantinople. Sultan Vahdettin invited the pro-Palace politician Damat Ferid Pasha to form a government, whose members quickly set out to purge the Unionists from the Ottoman government. Ferid Pasha hoped that his Anglophilia and an attitude of appeasement would induce less harsh peace terms from the Allied powers. However, his appointment was problematic for the Unionists, many being members of the liquidated committee that were surely to face trial. Years of corruption, unconstitutional acts, war profiteering, and enrichment from ethnic cleansing and genocide by the Unionists soon became basis of war crimes trials and courts martial trials held in Constantinople.

While many leading Unionists were sentenced lengthy prison sentences, many made sure to escape the country before Allied occupation or to regions that the government now had minimal control over; thus most were sentenced in absentia. The Allies encouragement of the proceedings and the use of British Malta as their holding ground made the trials unpopular. The partisan nature of the trials was not lost on observers either. The hanging of the Kaymakam of Boğazlıyan district Mehmed Kemal resulted in a demonstration against the courts martials trials.

With all the chaotic politics in the capital and uncertainty of the severity of the incoming peace treaty, many Ottomans looked to Washington with the hope that the application of Wilsonian principles would mean Constantinople would stay Turkish, as Muslims outnumbered Christians 2:1. The United States never declared war on the Ottoman Empire, so many imperial elite believed Washington could be a neutral arbiter that could fix the empire's problems. Halide Edip (Adıvar) and her Wilsonian Principles Society led the movement that advocated for the empire to be governed by an American League of Nations Mandate (see United States during the Turkish War of Independence). American diplomats attempted to ascertain a role they could play in the area with the Harbord and King–Crane Commissions. However, with the collapse of Woodrow Wilson's health, the United States diplomatically withdrew from the Middle East to focus on Europe, leaving the Entente powers to construct a post-Ottoman order.

=== Banditry and the refugee crisis ===
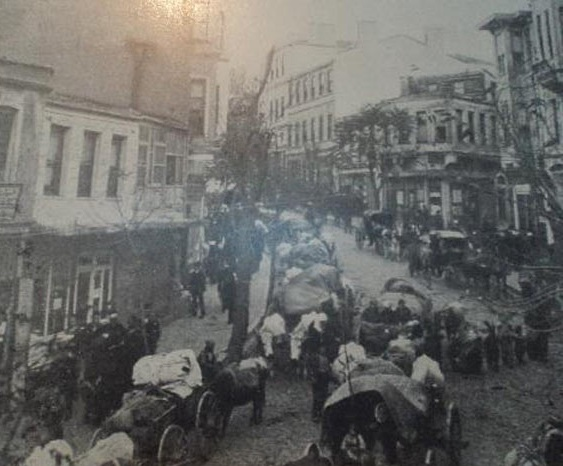
Muhacirs from the Balkan Wars waiting to cross the Bosphorus to Anatolia, Sirkeci, Istanbul, 1912

The Entente would have arrived at Constantinople to discover an administration attempting to deal with decades of accumulated refugee crisis. The new government issued a proclamation allowing for deportees to return to their homes, but many Greeks and Armenians found their old homes occupied by desperate Rumelian and Caucasian Muslim refugees who were settled in their properties during the First World War. Ethnic conflict restarted in Anatolia; government officials responsible for resettling Christian refugees often assisted Muslim refugees in these disputes, prompting European powers to continue bringing Ottoman territory under their control. Of the 800,000 Ottoman Christian refugees, approximately over half returned to their homes by 1920. Meanwhile 1.4 million refugees from the Russian Civil War would pass through the Turkish straits and Anatolia, with 150,000 White émigrés choosing to settle in Istanbul for short or long term (see Evacuation of the Crimea). Many provinces were simply depopulated from years of fighting, conscription, and ethnic cleansing (see Ottoman casualties of World War I). The province of Yozgat lost 50% of its Muslim population from conscription, while according to the governor of Van, almost 95% of its prewar residents were dead or internally displaced.

Administration in much of the Anatolian and Thracian countryside would soon all but collapse by 1919. Army deserters who turned to banditry essentially controlled fiefdoms with tacit approval from bureaucrats and local elites. An amnesty issued in late 1918 saw these bandits strengthen their positions and fight amongst each other instead of returning to civilian life. Albanian and Circassian muhacirs resettled by the government in northwestern Anatolia and Kurds in southeastern Anatolia were engaged in blood feuds that intensified during the war and were hesitant to pledge allegiance to the Defence of Rights movement, and only would if officials could facilitate truces. Various Muhacir groups were suspicious of the continued Unionist ideology in the Defence of Rights movement, and the potential for themselves to meet fates 'like the Armenians' especially as warlords hailing from those communities assisted the deportations of the Christians even though as many commanders in the Nationalist movement also had Caucasian and Balkan Muslim ancestry.

=== Mustafa Kemal's mission ===
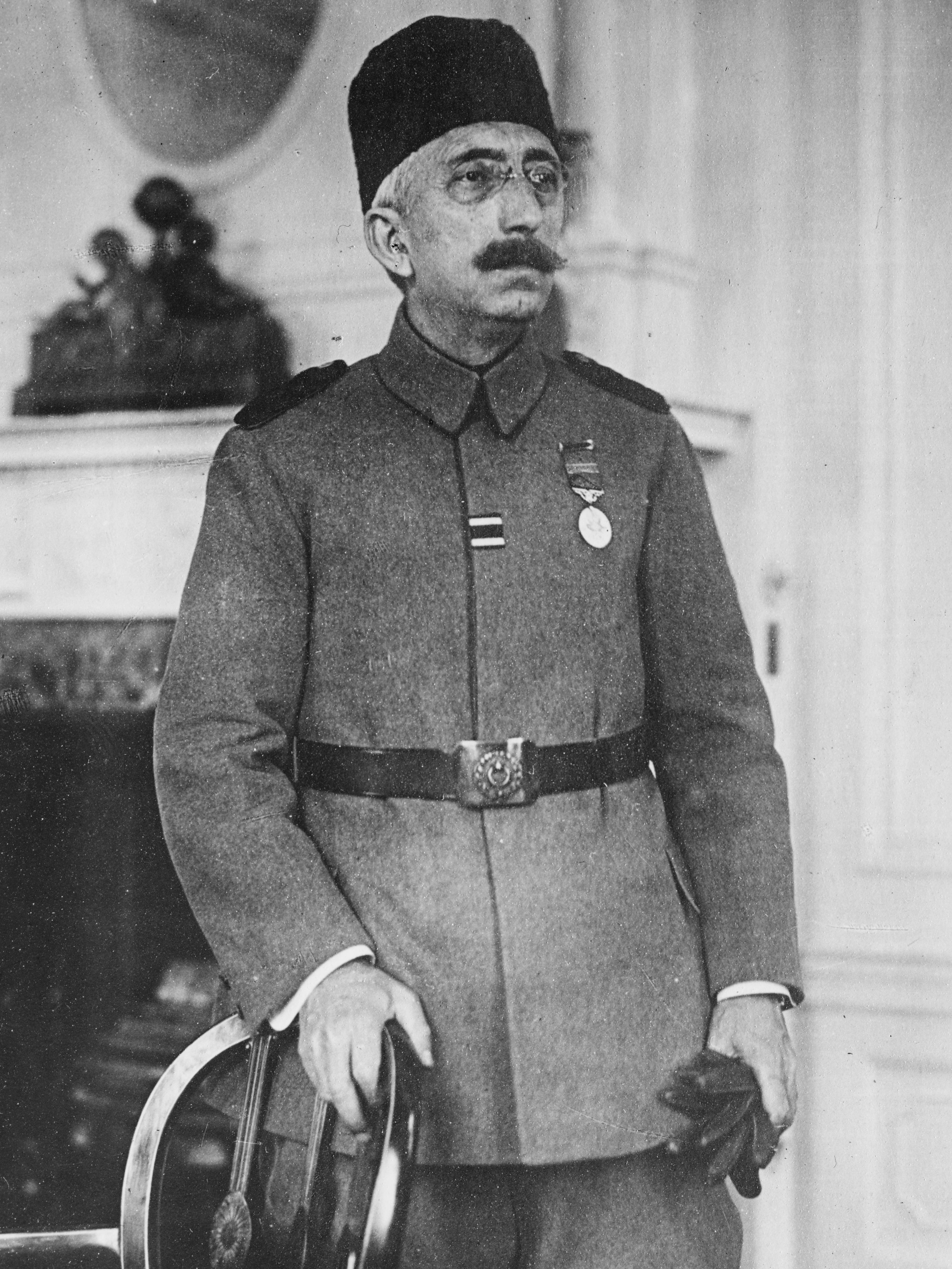
Sultan Mehmed VI after his sword girding

With Anatolia in practical anarchy and the Ottoman army being questionably loyal in reaction to Allied land seizures, Mehmed VI established the military inspectorate system to reestablish authority over the remaining empire. Encouraged by Karabekir and Edmund Allenby, he assigned Mustafa Kemal Pasha (Atatürk) as the inspector of the Ninth Army Troops Inspectorate –based in Erzurum– to restore order to Ottoman military units and to improve internal security on 30 April 1919, with his first assignment to suppress a rebellion by Greek rebels around the city of Samsun.

Mustafa Kemal was a well known, well respected, and well connected army commander, with much prestige coming from his status as the "Hero of Anafartalar"—for his role in the Gallipoli Campaign—and his title of "Honorary Aide-de-camp to His Majesty the Sultan" gained in the last months of WWI. This choice would seem curious, as he was a nationalist and a fierce critic of the government's accommodating policy to the Entente powers. He was also an early member of the CUP. However, Kemal Pasha did not associate himself with the fanatical faction of the CUP, many knew that he frequently clashed with the radicals of the Central Committee like Enver. He was therefore sidelined to the periphery of power throughout the Great War; after the CUP's dissolution he vocally aligned himself with moderates that formed the Liberal People's Party instead of the rump Renewal Party (both parties would be banned in May 1919 for being successors of the CUP). All these reasons allowed him to be the most legitimate nationalist for the sultan to placate. In this new political climate, Kemal, his friends, and soon to be sympathizers benefited from the purges, elevating to ever higher profile positions. He sought to capitalize on his war exploits to attain a better job, indeed several times he unsuccessfully lobbied for his inclusion in cabinet as War Minister. His new assignment gave him effective plenipotentiary powers over all of Anatolia which was meant to accommodate him and other nationalists to keep them loyal to the government.

Mustafa Kemal had earlier declined to become the leader of the Sixth Army headquartered in Nusaybin. But according to Lord Kinross, through manipulation and the help of friends and sympathizers, he became the inspector of virtually all of the Ottoman forces in Anatolia, tasked with overseeing the disbanding process of remaining Ottoman forces while at the same time suppressing a Greek uprising nearby Samsun. Kemal had an abundance of connections and personal friends concentrated in the post-armistice War Ministry, a powerful tool that would help him accomplish his secret goal: to lead a nationalist movement to safeguard Turkish interests against the Allied powers and a collaborative Ottoman government.

The day before his departure to Samsun on the remote Black Sea coast, Kemal had one last audience with Sultan Vahdettin, where he affirmed his loyalty to the sultan-caliph. It was in this meeting that they were informed of the botched occupation ceremony of Smyrna (İzmir) by the Greeks. Kemal and his carefully selected staff left Constantinople aboard the old steamer SS Bandırma on the evening of 16 May 1919.

=== Negotiations for Ottoman partition ===
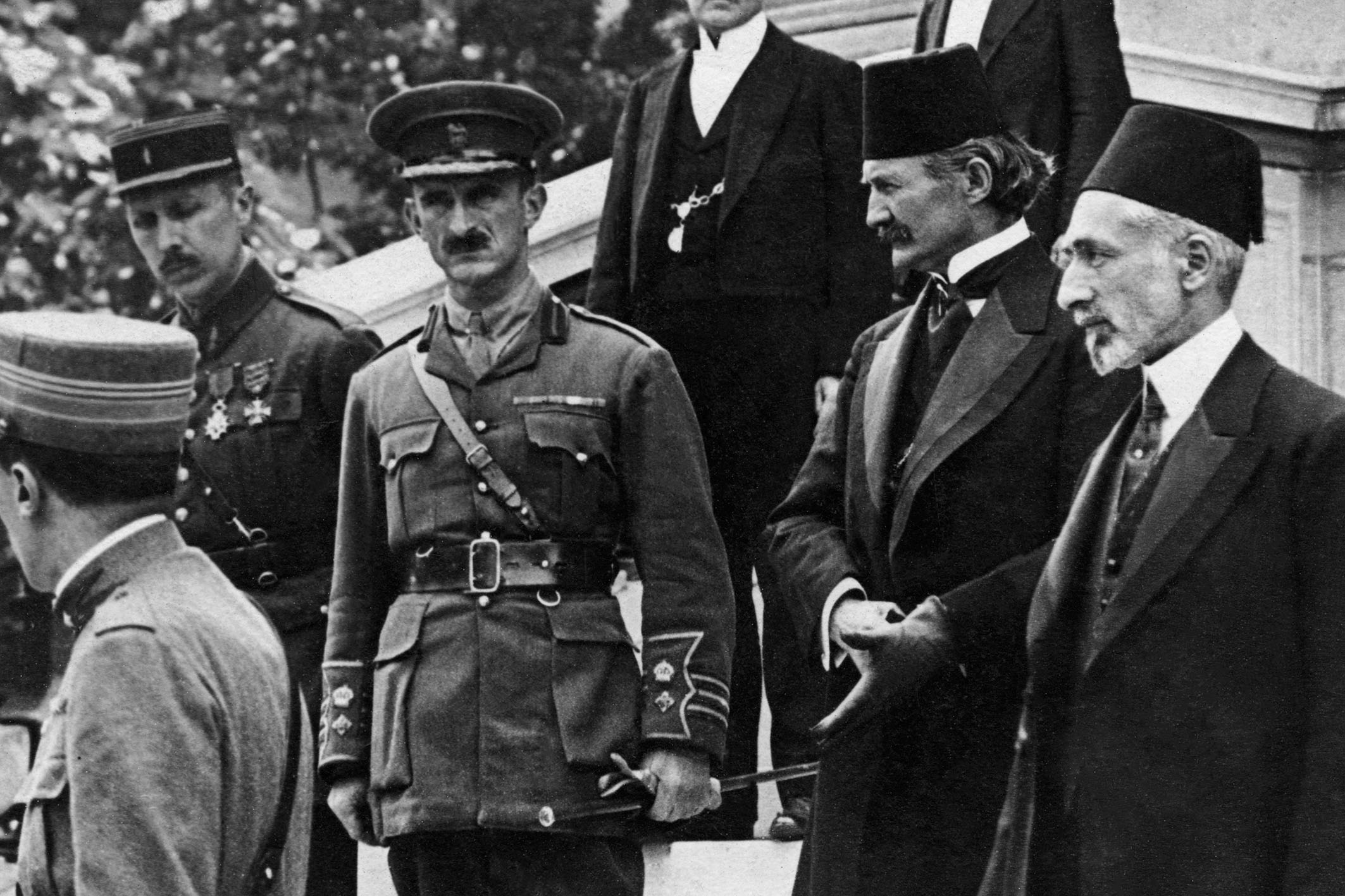
Gabriel Bougrain, Ahmed Tevfik Pasha (Okday), and Rıza Tevfik (Bölükbaşı) at the Paris Peace Conference

On 19 January 1919, the Paris Peace Conference was first held, at which Allied nations set the peace terms for the defeated Central Powers, including the Ottoman Empire. As a special body of the Paris Conference, "The Inter-Allied Commission on Mandates in Turkey", was established to pursue the secret treaties they had signed between 1915 and 1917. Italy sought control over the southern part of Anatolia under the Agreement of St.-Jean-de-Maurienne. France expected to exercise control over Hatay, Lebanon, Syria, and a portion of southeastern Anatolia based on the Sykes–Picot Agreement.

Greece justified their territorial claims of Ottoman land not least from Greece's entrance to WWI on the Allied side but also through the Megali Idea as well as international sympathy from the suffering of Ottoman Greeks in 1914 and 1917–1918. Privately, Greek prime minister Eleftherios Venizelos had British prime minister David Lloyd George's backing because of his Philhellenism, and from his charisma and charming personality. Greece's participation in the Allies' Southern Russian intervention also earned it favors in Paris. Venizelos' demands included parts of eastern Thrace, the islands of Imbros (Gökçeada), Tenedos (Bozcaada), and parts of Western Anatolia around the city of Smyrna (İzmir), all of which had large Greek populations. Venizelos also advocated a large Armenian state to check a post-war Ottoman Empire. Greece wanted to incorporate Constantinople, but Entente powers did not give permission. Damat Ferid Pasha went to Paris on behalf of the Ottoman Empire hoping to minimize territorial losses using Fourteen Points rhetoric, wishing for a return to status quo ante bellum, on the basis that every province of the Empire held Muslim majorities. This plea was met with ridicule.

At the Paris Peace Conference, competing claims over Western Anatolia by Greek and Italian delegations led Greece to land the flagship of the Greek Navy at Smyrna, resulting in the Italian delegation walking out of the peace talks. On 30 April, Italy responded to the possible idea of Greek incorporation of Western Anatolia by sending a warship to Smyrna as a show of force against the Greek campaign. A large Italian force also landed in Antalya. Faced with Italian annexation of parts of Asia Minor with a significant ethnic Greek population, Venizelos secured Allied permission for Greek troops to land in Smyrna per Article VII, ostensibly as a peacekeeping force to keep stability in the region. Venizelos's rhetoric was more directed against the CUP regime than the Turks as a whole, an attitude not always shared in the Greek military: "Greece is not making war against Islam, but against the anachronistic [Unionist] Government, and its corrupt, ignominious, and bloody administration, with a view to the expelling it from those territories where the majority of the population consists of Greeks." It was decided by the Triple Entente that Greece would control a zone around Smyrna and Ayvalık in western Asia Minor.

== Organizational phase: May 1919 – March 1920 ==
=== Greek landing at Smyrna ===
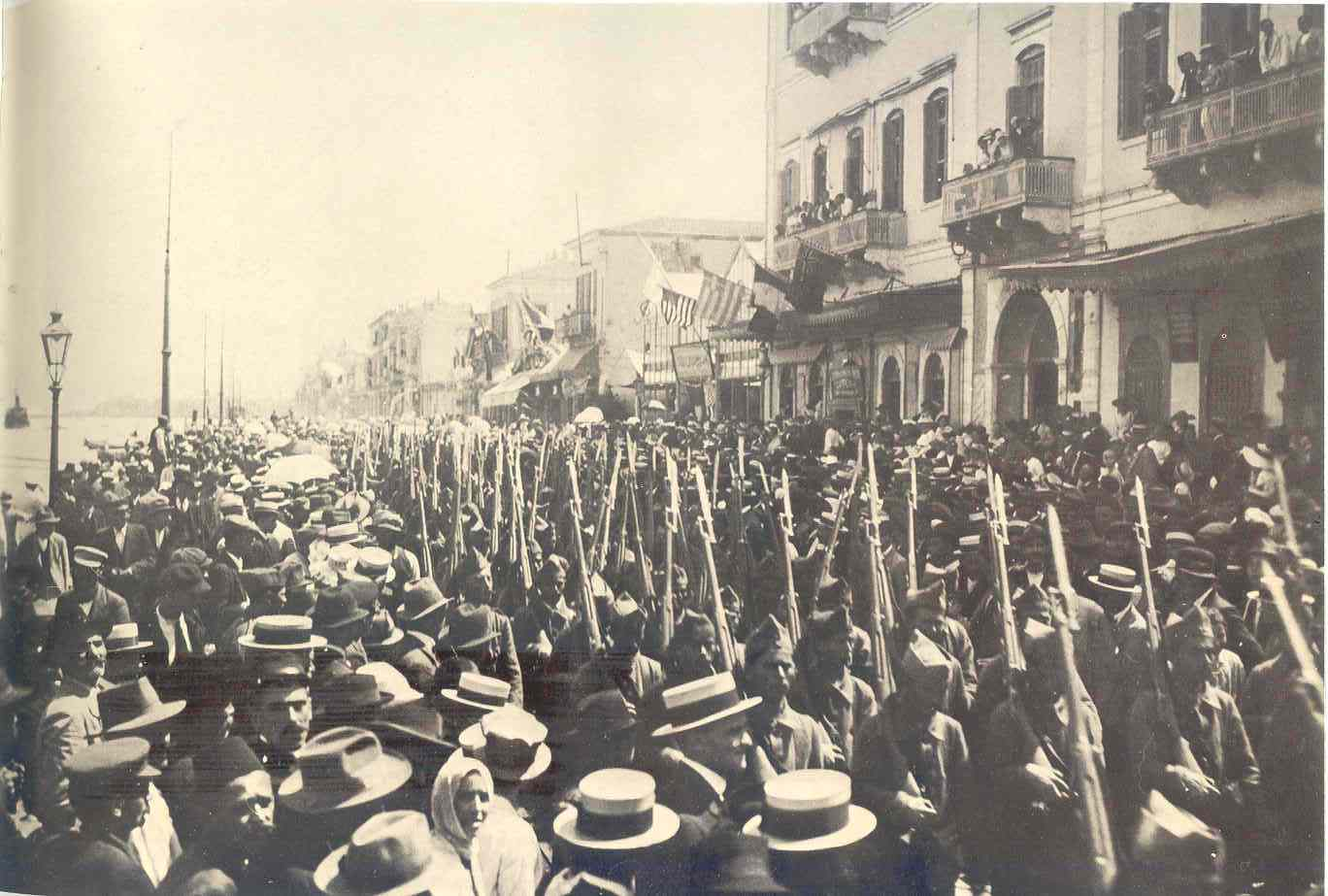
Greek troops marching on İzmir's coastal street, May 1919.

Most historians mark the Greek landing at Smyrna on 15 May 1919 as the start date of the Turkish War of Independence as well as the start of the "Kuva-yi Milliye Phase". The occupation ceremony from the outset was tense from nationalist fervor, with Ottoman Greeks greeting the soldiers with an ecstatic welcome, and Ottoman Muslims protesting the landing. A miscommunication in Greek high command led to an Evzone column marching by the municipal Turkish barracks. The nationalist journalist Hasan Tahsin fired the "first bullet" (Note: Mehmet Çavuş's fire against the French in Dörtyol was not known until recently. But Hasan Tahsin's firing was the first bullet in Western Front.) at the Greek standard bearer at the head of the troops, turning the city into a warzone. Süleyman Fethi Bey was murdered by bayonet for refusing to shout "Zito Venizelos" (meaning "long live Venizelos"), and 300–400 unarmed Turkish soldiers and civilians and 100 Greek soldiers and civilians were killed or wounded.

Greek troops moved from Smyrna outwards to towns on the Karaburun peninsula; to Selçuk, situated a hundred kilometres south of the city at a key location that commands the fertile Küçük Menderes River valley; and to Menemen towards the north. Guerilla warfare commenced in the countryside, as Turks began to organize themselves into irregular guerilla groups known as Kuva-yi Milliye (national forces), which were soon joined by Ottoman soldiers, bandits, and disaffected farmers. Most Kuva-yi Milliye bands were led by rogue military commanders and members of the Special Organization. The Greek troops based in cosmopolitan Smyrna soon found themselves conducting counterinsurgency operations in a hostile, dominantly Muslim hinterland. Groups of Ottoman Greeks also formed contingents that cooperated with the Greek Army to combat Kuva-yi Milliye within the zone of control. A massacre of Turks at Menemen was followed up with a battle for the town of Aydın, which saw intense intercommunal violence and the razing of the city. What was supposed to be a peacekeeping mission of Western Anatolia instead inflamed ethnic tensions and became a counterinsurgency.

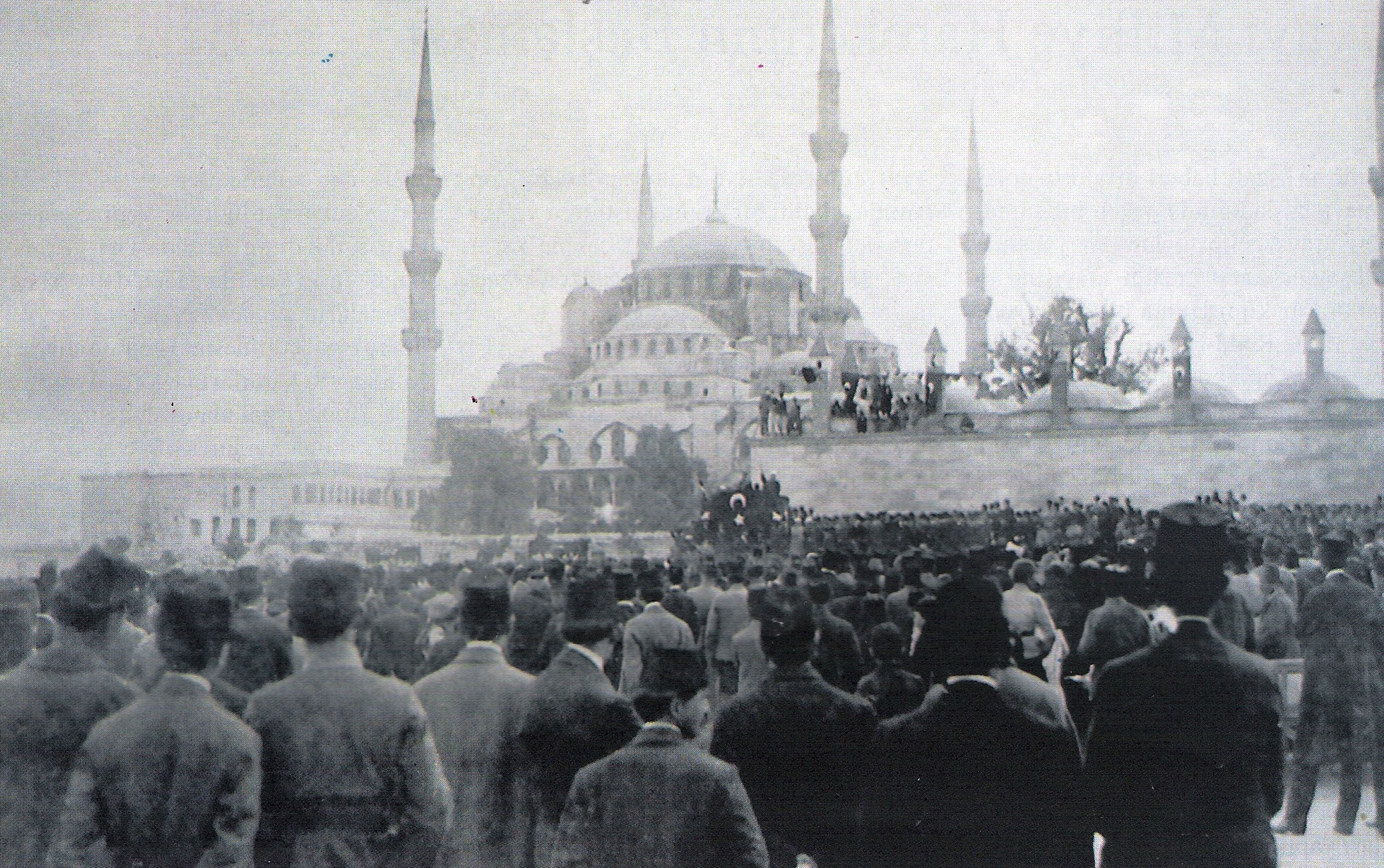
Sultanahmet demonstration, 25 May 1919

The reaction of Greek landing at Smyrna and continued Allied seizures of land served to destabilize Turkish civil society. Damat Ferid Pasha resigned as Grand Vizier, but the sultan reappointed him anyways. With the Chamber of Deputies dissolved, and the environment not looking conducive for an election, Sultan Mehmed VI called for a Sultanate Council (Şûrâ-yı Saltanat), so the government could be consulted by representatives of civil society how the Ottoman Empire should deal with its present predicaments. On 26 May 1919, 131 representatives of Ottoman civil society gathered in the capital as a faux parliament. Discussion focused on a new election for the Chamber of Deputies or to become a British or American mandate. By and large, the assembly was unsuccessful in its goals, and the Ottoman government did not develop a strategy to navigate the crises the empire was engulfed in.

Ottoman bureaucrats, military, and bourgeoisie trusted the Allies to bring peace, and thought the terms offered at Mudros were considerably more lenient than they actually were. Pushback was potent in the capital, with 23 May 1919 being largest of the Sultanahmet Square demonstrations organized by the Turkish Hearths against the Greek occupation of Smyrna, the largest act of civil disobedience in Turkish history at that point. The Ottoman government condemned the landing, but could do little about it.

=== Organizing resistance ===
Mustafa Kemal Pasha and his colleagues stepped ashore in Samsun on 19 May and set up their first quarters in the Mıntıka Palace Hotel. British troops were present in Samsun, and he initially maintained cordial contact. He had assured Damat Ferid about the army's loyalty towards the new government in Constantinople. However, behind the government's back, Kemal made the people of Samsun aware of the Greek and Italian landings, staged discreet mass meetings, made fast connections via telegraph with the army units in Anatolia, and began to form links with various Nationalist groups. He sent telegrams of protest to foreign embassies and the War Ministry about British reinforcements in the area and about British aid to Greek brigand gangs. After a week in Samsun, Kemal and his staff moved to Havza. It was there that he first showed the flag of the resistance.

Kuva-yi Milliye

Mustafa Kemal wrote in his memoir that he needed nationwide support to justify armed resistance against the Allied occupation. His credentials and the importance of his position were not enough to inspire everyone. While officially occupied with the disarming of the army, he met with various contacts in order to build his movement's momentum. He met with Rauf Pasha, Karabekir Pasha, Ali Fuat Pasha, and Refet Pasha and issued the Amasya Circular (22 June 1919). Ottoman provincial authorities were notified via telegraph that the unity and independence of the nation was at risk, and that the government in Constantinople was compromised. To remedy this, a congress was to take place in Erzurum between delegates of the Six Vilayets to decide on a response, and another congress would take place in Sivas where every Vilayet should send delegates. Sympathy and a lack of coordination from the capital gave Mustafa Kemal freedom of movement and telegraph use despite his implied anti-government tone.

On 23 June, High Commissioner Admiral Calthorpe, realising the significance of Mustafa Kemal's discreet activities in Anatolia, sent a report about the Pasha to the Foreign Office. His remarks were downplayed by George Kidson of the Eastern Department. Captain Hurst of the British occupation force in Samsun warned Admiral Calthorpe one more time, but Hurst's units were replaced with the Brigade of Gurkhas. When the British landed in Alexandretta, Admiral Calthorpe resigned on the basis that this was against the armistice that he had signed and was assigned to another position on 5 August 1919. The movement of British units alarmed the population of the region and convinced them that Mustafa Kemal was right.

=== Consolidation through congresses ===
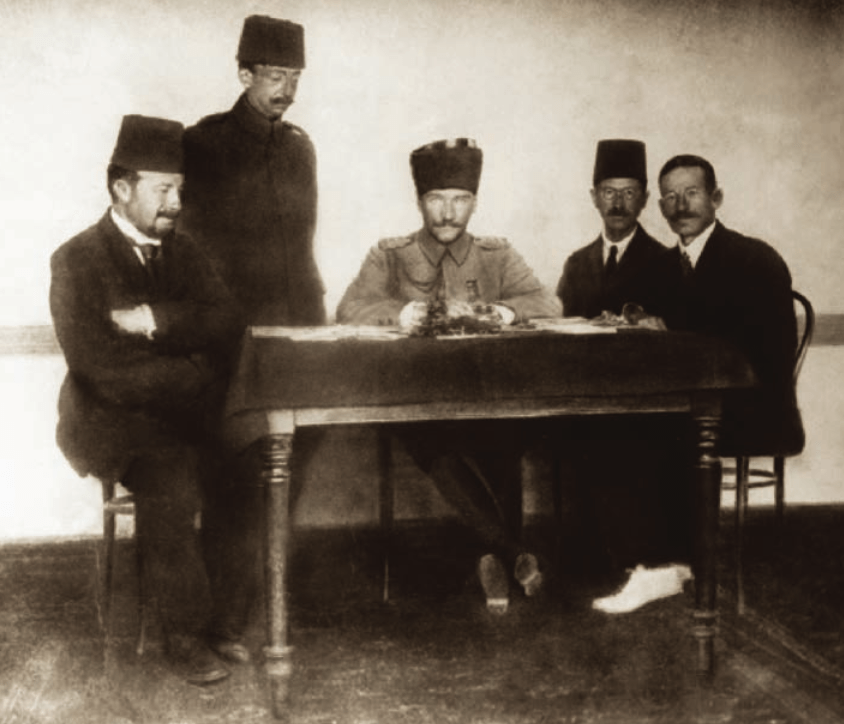
Mustafa Kemal and his colleagues in Erzurum, 5 July 1919

By early July, Mustafa Kemal Pasha received telegrams from the sultan and Calthorpe, asking him and Refet to cease his activities in Anatolia and return to the capital. Kemal was in Erzincan and did not want to return to Constantinople, concerned that the foreign authorities might have designs for him beyond the sultan's plans. Before resigning from his position, he dispatched a circular to all nationalist organizations and military commanders to not disband or surrender unless for the latter if they could be replaced by cooperative nationalist commanders. Now only a civilian stripped of his command, Mustafa Kemal was at the mercy of the new inspector of Third Army (renamed from Ninth Army) Karabekir Pasha, indeed the War Ministry ordered him to arrest Kemal, an order which Karabekir refused. The Erzurum Congress was a meeting of delegates and governors from the six Eastern Vilayets. They drafted the National Pact (Misak-ı Millî), which envisioned new borders for the Ottoman Empire by applying principles of national self-determination per Woodrow Wilson's Fourteen Points and the abolition of the capitulations. The Erzurum Congress concluded with a circular that was effectively a declaration of independence: All regions within Ottoman borders upon the signing of the Mudros Armistice were indivisible from the Ottoman state –Greek and Armenian claims on Thrace and Anatolia were moot– and assistance from any country not coveting Ottoman territory was welcome. If the government in Constantinople was not able to attain this after electing a new parliament, they insisted a provisional government should be promulgated to defend Turkish sovereignty. The Committee of Representation was established as a provisional executive body based in Anatolia, with Mustafa Kemal Pasha as its chairman.

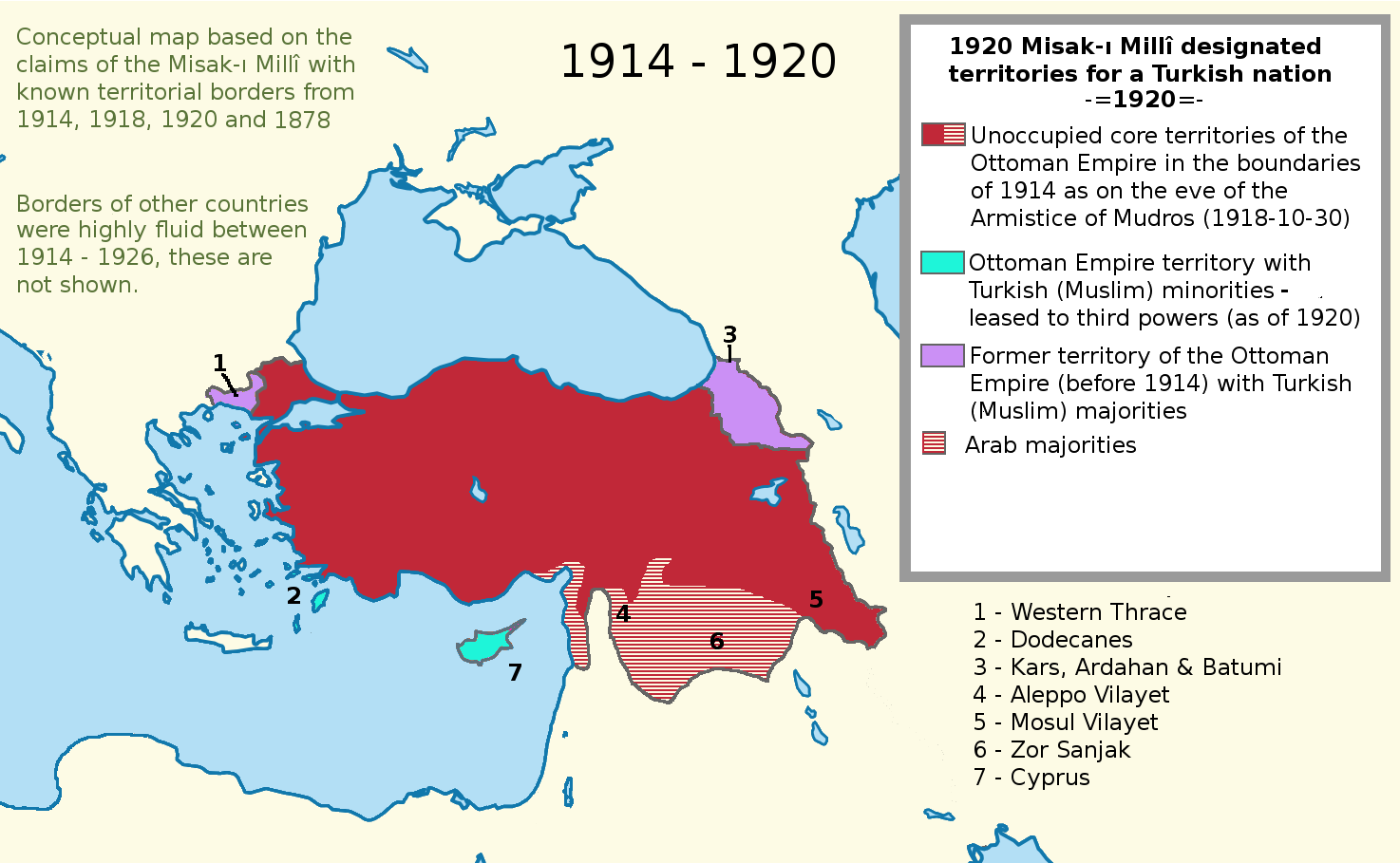
Borders and plebiscites of the National Pact outlined in the Erzurum Congress

Following the congress, the Committee of Representation relocated to Sivas. As announced in the Amasya Circular, a new congress was held there in September with delegates from all Anatolian and Thracian provinces. The Sivas Congress repeated the points of the National Pact agreed to in Erzurum, and united the various regional Defence of National Rights Associations organizations, into a united political organisation: Anatolia and Rumeli Defence of Rights Association (A-RMHC), with Mustafa Kemal as its chairman. In an effort show his movement was in fact a new and unifying movement, the delegates had to swear an oath to discontinue their relations with the CUP and to never revive the party (despite most present in Sivas being previous members). It was also decided there that the Ottoman Empire should not be a League of Nations mandate under the United States, especially after the U.S. Senate failed to ratify American membership in the League.

Momentum was now on the Nationalists' side. A plot by a loyalist Ottoman governor and a British intelligence officer to arrest Kemal before the Sivas Congress led to the cutting of all ties with the Ottoman government until a new election would be held in the lower house of parliament, the Chamber of Deputies. In October 1919, the last Ottoman governor loyal to Constantinople fled his province. Fearing the outbreak of hostilities, all British troops stationed in the Black Sea coast and Kütahya were evacuated. Damat Ferid Pasha resigned, and the sultan replaced him with a general with nationalist credentials: Ali Rıza Pasha. On 16 October 1919, Ali Rıza and the Nationalists held negotiations in Amasya. They agreed in the Amasya Protocol that an election would be called for the Ottoman Parliament to establish national unity by upholding the resolutions made in the Sivas Congress, including the National Pact.

By October 1919, the Ottoman government only held de facto control over Constantinople; the rest of the Ottoman Empire was loyal to Kemal's movement to resist a partition of Anatolia and Thrace. Within a few months Mustafa Kemal went from General Inspector of the Ninth Army to a renegade military commander discharged for insubordination to leading a homegrown anti-Entente movement that overthrew a government and driven it into resistance.

=== Last Ottoman parliament ===
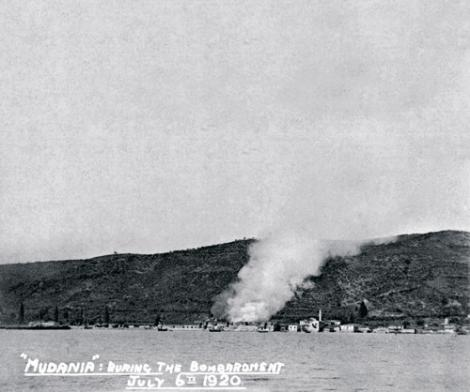
Fire caused by the British bombardment in Mudanya (6 July 1920)

In December 1919, an election was held for the Ottoman parliament, with polls only open in unoccupied Anatolia and Thrace. It was boycotted by Ottoman Greeks, Ottoman Armenians and the Freedom and Accord Party, resulting in groups associated with the Turkish Nationalist Movement winning, including the A-RMHC. The Nationalists' obvious links to the CUP made the election especially polarizing and voter intimidation and ballot box stuffing in favor of the Kemalists were regular occurrences in rural provinces. This controversy led to many of the nationalist MPs organizing the National Salvation Group separate from Kemal's movement, which risked the nationalist movement splitting in two.

Mustafa Kemal was elected an MP from Erzurum, but he expected the Allies neither to accept the Harbord report nor to respect his parliamentary immunity if he went to the Ottoman capital, hence he remained in Anatolia. Mustafa Kemal and the Committee of Representation moved from Sivas to Ankara so that he could keep in touch with as many deputies as possible as they traveled to Constantinople to attend the parliament.

Though Ali Rıza Pasha called the election as per the Amasya Protocol to keep unity between the "Istanbul government" and "Ankara government", he was wrong to think the election could bring him any legitimacy. The Ottoman parliament was under the de facto control of the British battalion stationed at Constantinople and any decisions by the parliament had to have the signatures of both Ali Rıza Pasha and the battalion's commanding officer. The only laws that passed were those acceptable to, or specifically ordered by the British. Nevertheless, the War Ministry established contact with National Forces fighting the Greeks, sending supplies, arms, and aide to militia.

On 12 January 1920, the last session of the Chamber of Deputies met in the capital. First the sultan's speech was presented, and then a telegram from Mustafa Kemal, manifesting the claim that the rightful government of Turkey was in Ankara in the name of the Committee of Representation. On 28 January the MPs from both sides of the aisle secretly met to endorse the National Pact as a peace settlement. They added to the points passed in Sivas, calling for plebiscites to be held in West Thrace; Batum, Kars, and Ardahan, and Arab lands on whether to stay in the Empire or not. Proposals were also made to elect Kemal president of the Chamber; however, this was deferred in the certain knowledge that the British would prorogue the Chamber. The Chamber of Deputies would be forcefully dissolved for passing the National Pact anyway. The National Pact solidified Nationalist interests, which were in conflict with the Allied plans.

From February to April, leaders of Britain, France, and Italy met in London to discuss the partitioning of the Ottoman Empire and the crisis in Anatolia. The British began to sense that the elected Ottoman government was under Kemalist influence and if left unchecked, the Entente could once again find themselves at war with the Empire. The Ottoman government was not doing all that it could to suppress the Nationalists.

Mustafa Kemal manufactured a crisis to pressure the Istanbul government to pick a side by deploying Kuva-yi Milliye towards İzmit. The British, concerned about the security of the Bosporus Strait, demanded Ali Rıza Pasha to reassert control over the area, to which he responded with his resignation to the sultan.

== Jurisdictional conflict: March 1920 – January 1921 ==
=== Decapitation of the Istanbul government ===
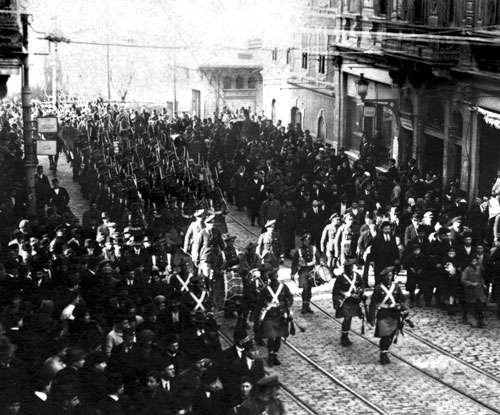
British occupation troops marching in Istanbul's Pera (Beyoğlu) quarter

As they were negotiating the partition of the Ottoman Empire, the Allies were growing increasingly concerned about the Turkish National Movement. To this end, the Allied occupational authorities in Istanbul began to plan a raid to arrest nationalist politicians and journalists along with occupying military and police installations and government buildings. On 16 March 1920, the coup was carried out; several Royal Navy warships were anchored in the Galata Bridge to support British forces, including the Indian Army, while they carried out the arrests and occupied several government buildings in the early hours of the morning.

An Indian Army operation, the Şehzadebaşı raid, resulted in 5 Ottoman soldiers from the 10th Infantry Division being killed when troops raided their barracks. Among those arrested were the senior leadership of the Turkish National Movement and former members of the CUP. 150 arrested Turkish politicians accused of war crimes were interned in Malta and became known as the Malta exiles.

Mustafa Kemal was ready for this move. He warned all the Nationalist organisations that there would be misleading declarations from the capital. He warned that the only way to counter Allied movements was to organise protests. He declared "Today the Turkish nation is called to defend its capacity for civilization, its right to life and independence – its entire future".

On 18 March, the Chamber of Deputies declared that it was unacceptable to arrest five of its members. On 11 April, the sultan Mehmed VI dissolve the parliament under pressure from the Allies, declaring the end of Constitutional Monarchy and a return to absolutism. University students were forbidden from joining political associations inside and outside the classroom. With the lower elected Chamber of Deputies shuttered, the Constitution terminated, and the capital occupied; Sultan Vahdettin, his cabinet, and the appointed Senate were all that remained of the Ottoman government, and were basically a puppet regime of the Allied powers. Grand Vizier Salih Hulusi Pasha declared Mustafa Kemal's struggle legitimate, and resigned after less than a month in office. In his place, Damat Ferid Pasha returned to the premiership. The Sublime Porte's decapitation by the Entente allowed Mustafa Kemal to consolidate his position as the sole leader of Turkish resistance against the Allies, and to that end made him the legitimate representative of the Turkish people.

=== Promulgation of the Grand National Assembly ===
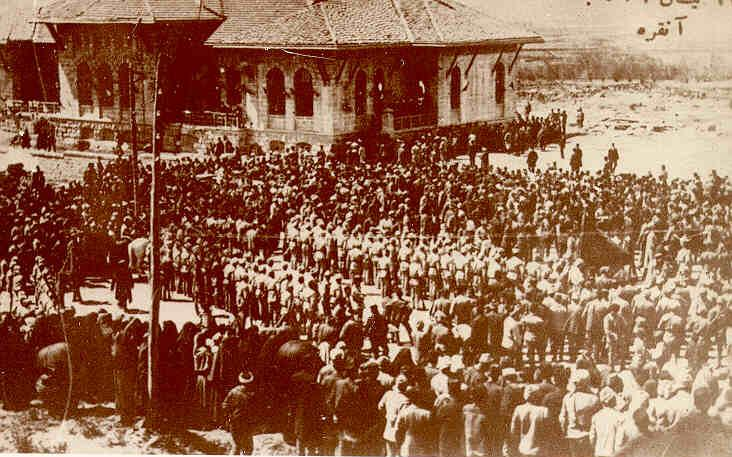
Opening of the Grand National Assembly

The strong measures taken against the Nationalists by the Allies in March 1920 began a distinct new phase of the conflict. Mustafa Kemal sent a note to the governors and force commanders, asking them to conduct elections to provide delegates for a new parliament to represent the Ottoman (Turkish) people, which would convene in Ankara. With the proclamation of the counter-government, Kemal would then ask the sultan to accept its authority. Mustafa Kemal appealed to the Islamic world, asking for help to make sure that everyone knew he was still fighting in the name of the sultan who was also the caliph. He stated he wanted to free the caliph from the Allies. He found an ally in the Khilafat movement of British India, where Indians protested Britain's planned dismemberment of Turkey. A committee was also started for sending funds to help the soon to be proclaimed Ankara government of Mustafa Kemal. A flood of supporters moved to Ankara just ahead of the Allied dragnets. Included among them were Halide Edip and Abdülhak Adnan (Adıvar), Mustafa İsmet Pasha (İnönü), Mustafa Fevzi Pasha (Çakmak), many of Kemal's allies in the Ministry of War, and Celalettin Arif, the president of the now shuttered Chamber of Deputies. Celaleddin Arif's desertion of the capital was of great significance, as he declared that the Ottoman Parliament had been dissolved illegally.

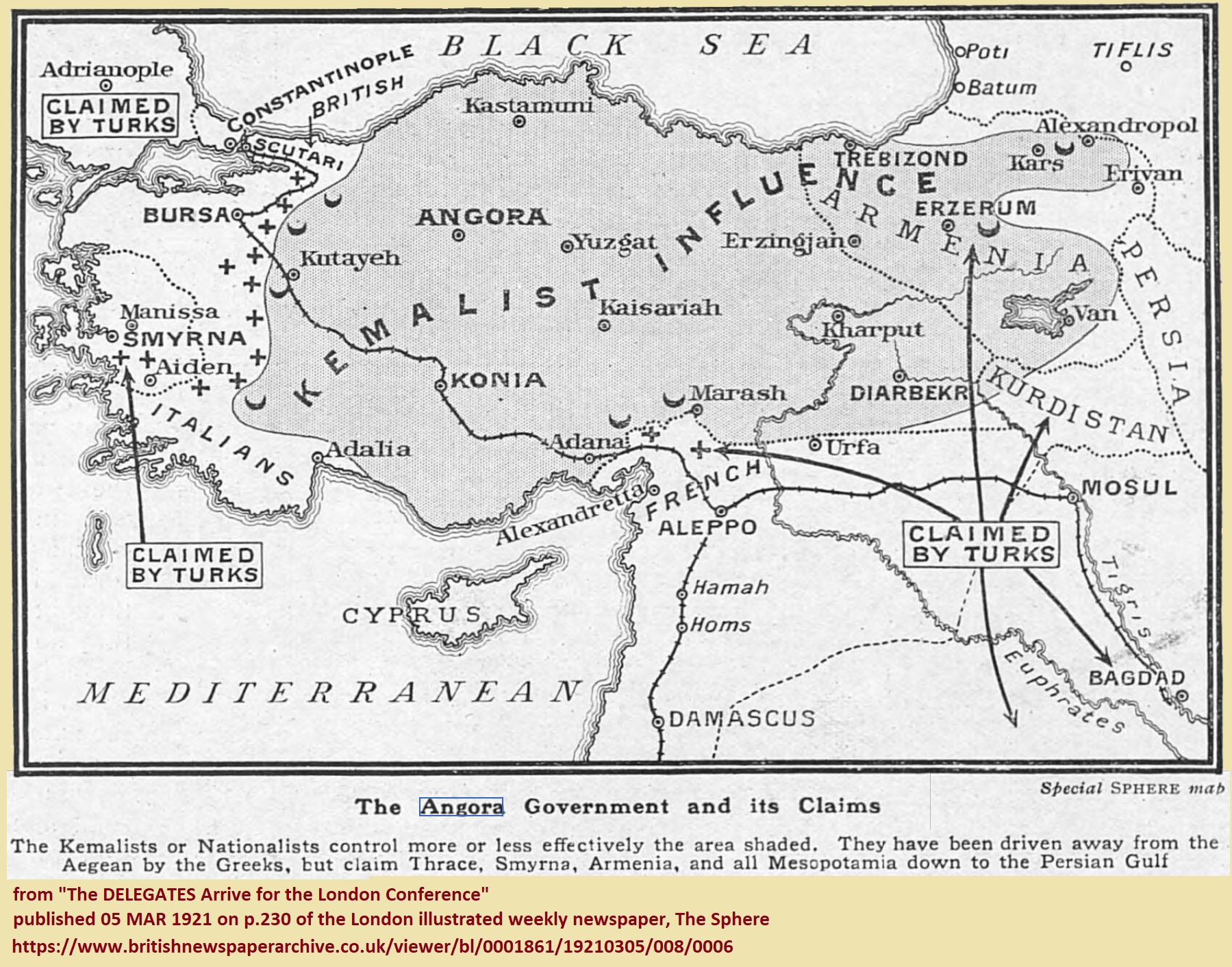
Zones of control held by the Ankara government and the Allies. Istanbul contemptuously referred to anyone who supported the nationalist movement led by Mustafa Kemal as "Kemalîs" or "Kemalcis". Kemalî was used pejoratively as a reference to the Celalî rebels. The foreign press used the term "Kemalists" interchangeably with the word "nationalists" to denote the Ankara-based movement and its armed strength.

Some 100 members of the Chamber of Deputies were able to escape the Allied roundup and joined 190 deputies elected. In March 1920, Turkish revolutionaries announced the establishment of a new parliament in Ankara known as the Grand National Assembly of Turkey (GNA) that was dominated by the A-RMHC. The parliament included Turks, Circassians, Kurds, and one Jew. They met in a building that used to serve as the provincial headquarters of the local CUP chapter. The inclusion of "Turkey" in its name reflected an increasing trend of new ways Ottoman citizens thought of their country, and was the first time it was formally used as the name of the country. On 23 April, the assembly, assuming full governmental powers, gathered for the first time, electing Mustafa Kemal its first Speaker and Prime Minister.

Hoping to undermine the Nationalist Movement, Mehmed VI issued a fatwa to qualify the Turkish revolutionaries as infidels, calling for the death of its leaders. The fatwa stated that true believers should not go along with the Nationalist Movement as they committed apostasy. The mufti of Ankara Rifat Börekçi issued a simultaneous fatwa, declaring that the caliphate was under the control of the Entente and the Ferid Pasha government. In this text, the Nationalist Movement's goal was stated as freeing the sultanate and the caliphate from its enemies. In reaction to the desertion of several prominent figures to the Nationalist Movement, Ferid Pasha ordered Halide Edip, Ali Fuat and Mustafa Kemal to be sentenced to death in absentia for treason.

=== Clashes in İzmit ===
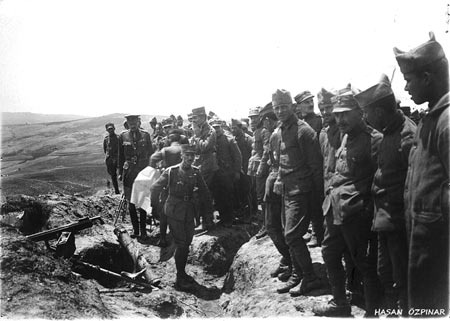
A British officer inspecting Greek troops and trenches in Anatolia

The Istanbul government finally found an ally outside of the city walls in Ahmet Anzavur. Throughout late 1919 and early 1920 the warlord recruited fellow Circassian bandits, decrying Kemal's nationalists as 'wicked Unionists and freemasons'.

On 28 April the sultan raised 4,000 soldiers known as the Kuva-yi Inzibatiye (Caliphate Army) to combat the Nationalists. Then using money from the Allies, another force about 2,000 strong from non-Muslim inhabitants were initially deployed in İznik. The sultan's government sent the forces under the name of the Caliphate Army to the revolutionaries to arouse counterrevolutionary sympathy. The British, being skeptical of how formidable these insurgents were, decided to use irregular power to counteract the revolutionaries. The Nationalist forces were distributed all around Turkey, so many smaller units were dispatched to face them. In İzmit there were two battalions of the British army. These units were to be used to rout the partisans under the command of Ali Fuat and Refet Pasha.

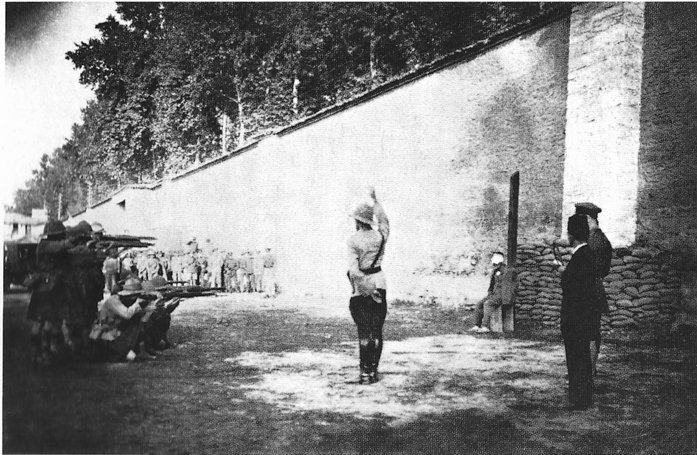
Execution of a Kemalist by the British forces in Izmit (1920)

Anatolia had many competing forces on its soil: British troops, Nationalist militia (Kuva-yi Milliye), the sultan's army (Kuva-yi Inzibatiye), and Anzavur's bands. On 13 April 1920, an uprising supported by Anzavur against the GNA occurred at Düzce as a direct consequence of the fatwa. Within days the rebellion spread to Bolu and Gerede. The movement engulfed northwestern Anatolia for about a month. On 14 June, Nationalist militia fought a pitched battle near İzmit against the Kuva-yi İnzibatiye, Anzavur's bands, and British units. Under heavy attack some of the Kuva-yi İnzibatiye deserted and joined the Nationalist militia. Anzavur was not so lucky, as the Nationalists tasked Ethem the Circassian with crushing Anzavur's revolt. This revealed the sultan did not have the unwavering support of his own men and allies. Meanwhile, the rest of these forces withdrew behind the British lines which held their position. For now, Istanbul was out of Ankara's grasp.

The clash outside İzmit brought serious consequences. British troops attacked the Nationalists and the Royal Air Force bombed their positions. This caused Nationalist forces to retreat temporarily to more secure locations. The British commander in Turkey, General George Milne, asked for reinforcements. This led to a study to determine what would be required to defeat the Turkish Nationalists. The report, signed by French Field Marshal Ferdinand Foch, concluded that 27 divisions were necessary, but the British army did not have 27 divisions to spare. Also, a deployment of this size could have disastrous political consequences back home. World War I had just ended, and the British public would not support another lengthy and costly expedition.

The British accepted the fact that a nationalist movement could not be defeated without deployment of well-trained forces. On 25 June, the Kuva-yi Inzibatiye was disbanded under British supervision. The British realised that the best option to overcome these Turkish Nationalists was to use a force that was battle-tested and fierce enough to fight the Turks on their own soil. The British had to look no further than Turkey's neighbor, already occupying part of its territory: Greece.

=== Treaty of Sèvres ===
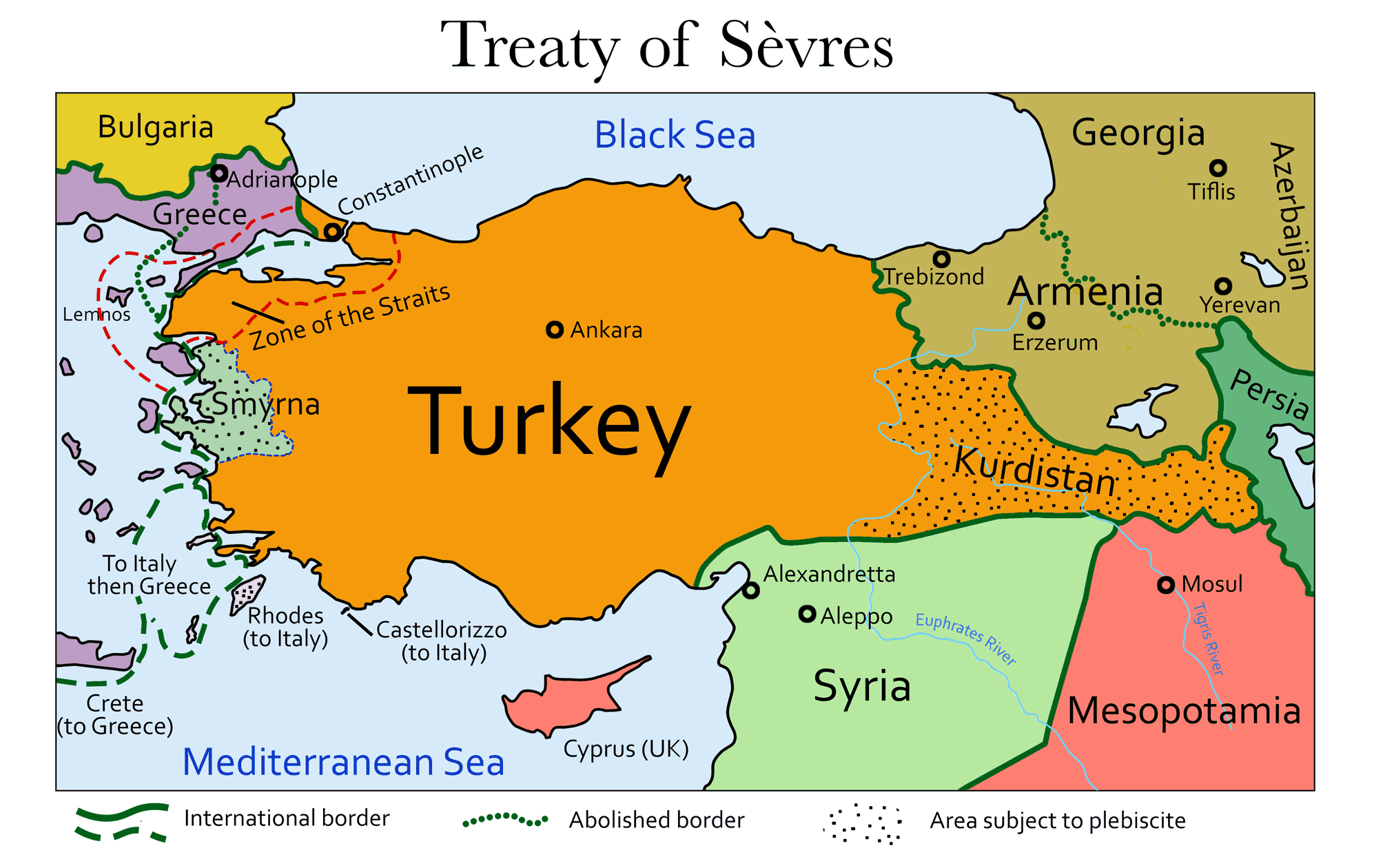
Borders (spheres of influence not shown) of the Ottoman Empire according to the unratified Treaty of Sèvres (1920) which was annulled and replaced by the Treaty of Lausanne in 1923

Eleftherios Venizelos, pessimistic of the rapidly deteriorating situation in Anatolia, requested to the Allies that a peace treaty be drawn up with the hope that fighting would stop.

The subsequent Treaty of Sèvres in August 1920 confirmed the Arab provinces of the empire would be reorganized into new nations given to Britain and France in the form of Mandates by the League of Nations, while the rest of the Empire would be partitioned between Greece, Italy, France (via Syrian mandate), Britain (via Iraqi mandate), Armenia (potentially under an American mandate), and Georgia. Smyrna would hold a plebiscite on whether to stay with Greece or Turkey, and the Kurdistan region would hold one on the question of independence. British, French, and Italian spheres of influence would also extend into Anatolia beyond the land concessions. The old capital of Constantinople as well as the Dardanelles would be under international League of Nations control.

However, the treaty could never come into effect. The treaty was extremely unpopular, with protests against the final document held even before its release in Sultanahmet square. Though Mehmed VI and Ferid Pasha loathed the treaty, they did not want Istanbul to join Ankara in nationalist struggle. The Ottoman government and Greece never ratified it. Though Ferid Pasha signed the treaty, the Ottoman Senate, the upper house with seats appointed by the sultan, refused to ratify the treaty. Greece disagreed on the borders drawn. The other allies began to fracture their support of the settlement immediately. Italy started openly supporting the Nationalists with arms by the end of 1920, and the French signed another separate peace treaty with Ankara only months later.

Kemal's GNA Government responded to the Treaty of Sèvres by promulgating a new constitution in January 1921. The resulting constitution consecrated the principle of popular sovereignty; authority not deriving from the unelected sultan, but from the Turkish people who elect governments representative of their interests. This document became the legal basis for the war of independence by the GNA, as the sultan's signature of the Treaty of Sèvres would be unconstitutional as his position was not elected. While the constitution did not specify a future role of the sultan, the document gave Kemal ever more legitimacy in the eyes of Turks for justified resistance against Istanbul.

== Fighting ==
=== Southern Front ===
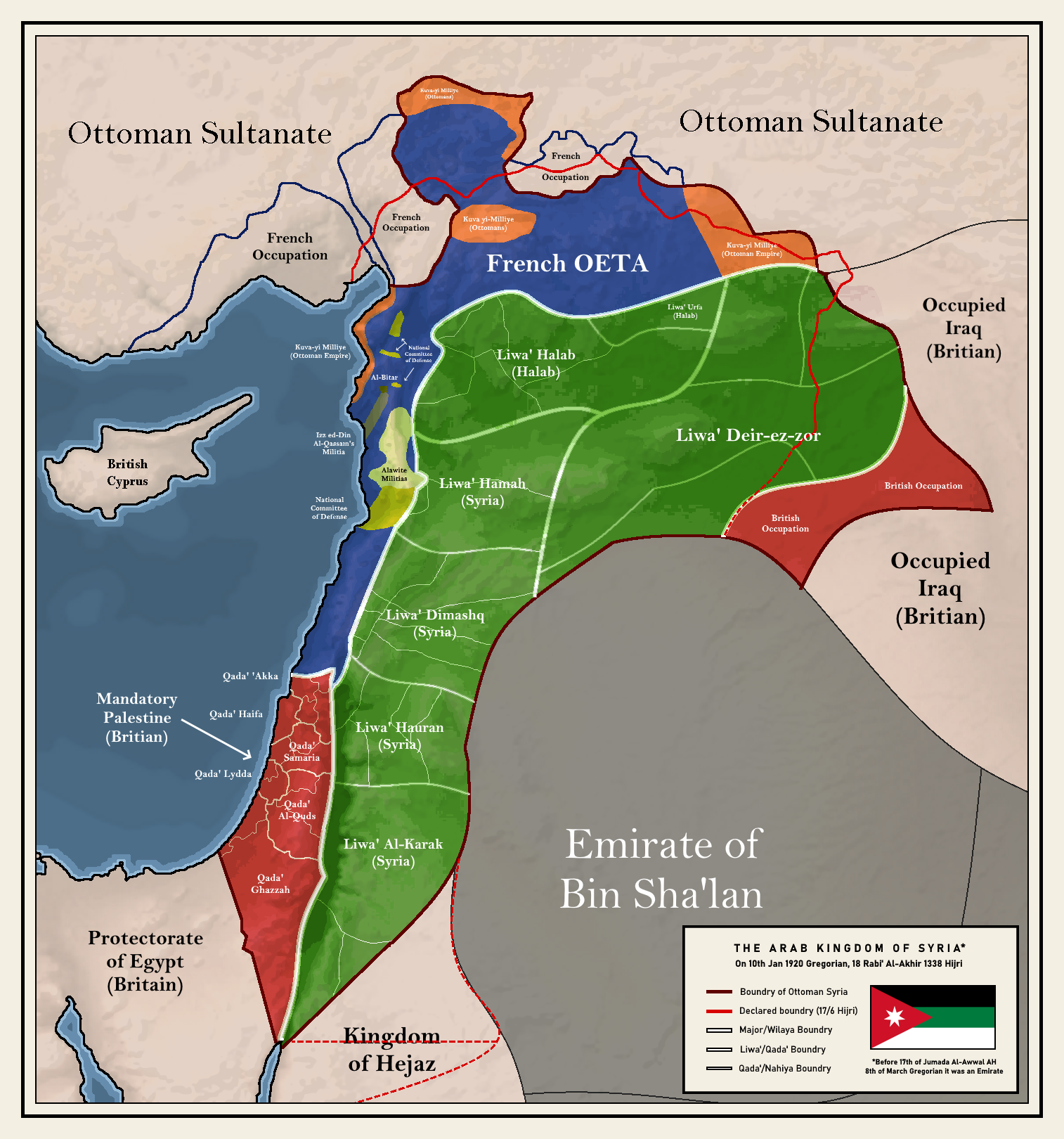
Military situation of Syria and Cilicia, January 1920

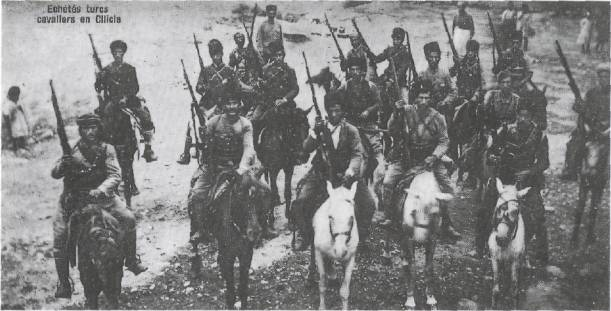
Turkish militias in Cilicia

In contrast to the Eastern and Western fronts, it was mostly unorganized Kuva-yi Milliye which were fighting in the Southern Front against France. They had help from the Syrians, who were fighting their own war with the French.

The British troops which occupied coastal Syria by the end of World War I were replaced by French troops over 1919, with the Syrian interior going to Faisal bin Al-Hussein's self-proclaimed Arab Kingdom of Syria. France which wanted to take control of all of Syria and Cilicia. There was also a desire facilitate the return of Armenian refugees in the region to their homes, and the occupation force consisted of the French Armenian Legion as well as various Armenian militia groups. 150,000 Armenians were repatriated to their homes within months of French occupation. On 21 January 1920, a Turkish Nationalist uprising and siege occurred against the French garrison in Marash. The French position untenable they retreated to Islahiye, resulting in a massacre of many Armenians by Turkish militia. A grueling siege followed in Antep which featured intense sectarian violence between Turks and Armenians. After a failed uprising by the Nationalists in Adana, by 1921, the French and Turks signed an armistice and eventually a treaty was brokered demarcating the border between the Ankara government and French controlled Syria. In the end, there was a mass exodus of Cilician Armenians to French controlled Syria, Previous Armenian survivors of deportation found themselves again as refugees and families which avoided the worst of the six years violence were forced from their homes, ending thousands of years of Christian presence in Southern Anatolia. With France being the first Allied power to recognize and negotiate with the Ankara government only months after signing the Treaty of Sèvres, it was the first to break from the coordinated Allied approach to the Eastern question. In 1923 the Mandate for Syria and the Lebanon under French authority would be proclaimed in former Ottoman territory.

Some efforts to coordinate between Turkish Nationalists and the Syrian rebels persisted from 1920 to 1921, with the Nationalists supporting the Faisal's kingdom through Ibrahim Hanunu and Alawite groups which were also fighting the French. While the French conquered Syria, Cilicia had to be abandoned.

=== Al-Jazira Front ===
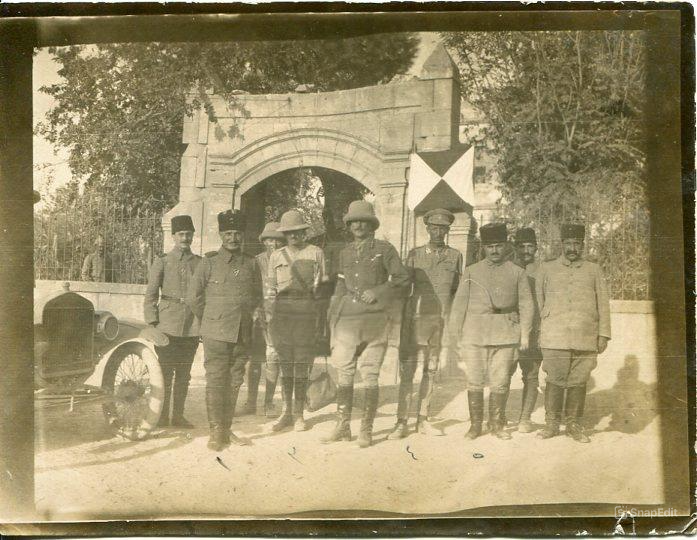
A photo which includes Ali İhsan Sâbis, Alexander Cobbe, General Robert Cassels, Gerard Leachman (who was killed in the 1920 Iraqi revolt) and other military personnel in front of Mosul Military Headquarters, 2 November 1918

Kuva-yi Milliye also engaged with British forces in the "Al-Jazira Front," primarily in Mosul. Ali İhsan Pasha (Sabis) and his forces defending Mosul would surrender to the British in October 1918, but the British ignored the armistice and seized the city, following which the pasha also ignored the armistice and distributed weapons to the locals. Even before Mustafa Kemal's movement was fully organized, rogue commanders found allies in Kurdish tribes. The Kurds detested the taxes and centralization the British demanded, including Shaykh Mahmud of the Barzani family. Having previously supported the British invasion of Mesopotamia to become the governor of South Kurdistan, Mahmud revolted but was apprehended by 1919. Without legitimacy to govern the region, he was released from captivity to Sulaymaniyah, where he again declared an uprising against the British as the King of Kurdistan. Though an alliance existed with the Turks, little material support came to him from Ankara, and by 1923 there was a desire to cease hostilities between the Turks and British at Barzanji's expense. Mahmud was overthrown in 1924, and after a 1926 plebiscite, Mosul was awarded to British-controlled Iraq.

=== Eastern Front ===
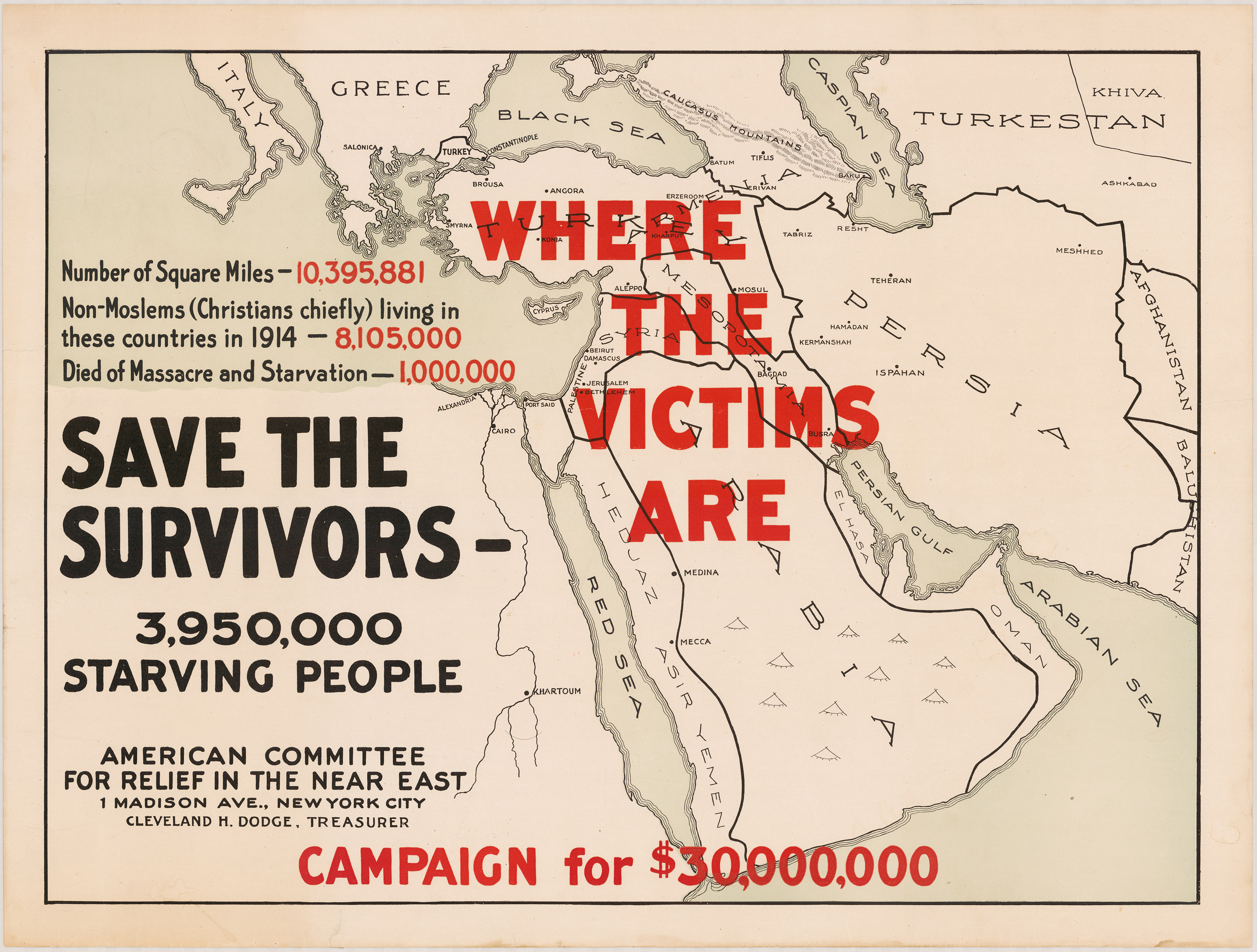
Fundraising poster by the American Committee for Relief in the Near East

Since 1917, the Caucasus was in a chaotic state. The border of newly independent Armenia and the Ottoman Empire was defined in the Treaty of Brest-Litovsk (3 March 1918) after the Bolshevik revolution, and later by the Treaty of Batum (4 June 1918). To the east, Armenia was at war with the Azerbaijan Democratic Republic after the breakup of the Transcaucasian Democratic Federative Republic, and received support from Anton Denikin's White Russian Army. It was obvious that after the Armistice of Mudros (30 October 1918) the eastern border was not going to stay as it was drawn, which mandated the evacuation of the Ottoman army back to its 1914 borders. Right after the Armistice of Mudros was signed, pro-Ottoman provisional republics were proclaimed in Kars and Aras which were subsequently invaded by Armenia. Ottoman soldiers were convinced not to demobilize lest the area become a 'second Macedonia'. Both sides of the new borders had massive refugee populations and famine, which were compounded by the renewed and more symmetric sectarian violence (see massacres of Azerbaijanis in Armenia (1917–1921) and Muslim uprisings in Kars and Sharur–Nakhichevan). There were talks going on with the Armenian diaspora and Allied powers on reshaping the border. Woodrow Wilson agreed to transfer territories to Armenia based on the principles of national self-determination. The results of these talks were to be reflected on the Treaty of Sèvres (10 August 1920).

Kâzım Karabekir Pasha, commander of the XV corps, encountered Muslim refugees fleeing from the Armenian army, but did not have the authority to cross the border. Karabekir's two reports (30 May and 4 June 1920) outlined the situation in the region. He recommended redrawing the eastern borders, especially around Erzurum. The Russian government was receptive to this and demanded that Van and Bitlis be transferred to Armenia. This was unacceptable to the Turkish revolutionaries. However, Soviet support was absolutely vital for the Turkish Nationalist movement, as Turkey was underdeveloped and had no domestic armaments industry. Bakir Sami (Kunduh) was assigned to negotiate with the Bolsheviks.

On 24 September 1920, Karabekir's XV corps and Kurdish militia invaded Armenia, advancing into Kars and Alexandropol. With an advance on Yerevan imminent, on 28 November 1920, the 11th Red Army under the command of Anatoliy Gekker crossed over into Armenia from Soviet Azerbaijan, and the Armenian government surrendered to Bolshevik forces.

The Treaty of Alexandropol (2—3 December 1920) was the first treaty (although illegitimate) signed by the Turkish revolutionaries. The 10th article in the Treaty of Alexandropol stated that Armenia renounced the Treaty of Sèvres and its allotted partition of Anatolia. The agreement was signed with representatives of the former government of Armenia, which by that time had no de jure or de facto power in Armenia, since Soviet rule was already established in the country. On 16 March 1921, the Bolsheviks and Turkey signed a more comprehensive agreement, the Treaty of Kars, which involved representatives of Soviet Armenia, Soviet Azerbaijan, and Soviet Georgia.

=== Western Front ===
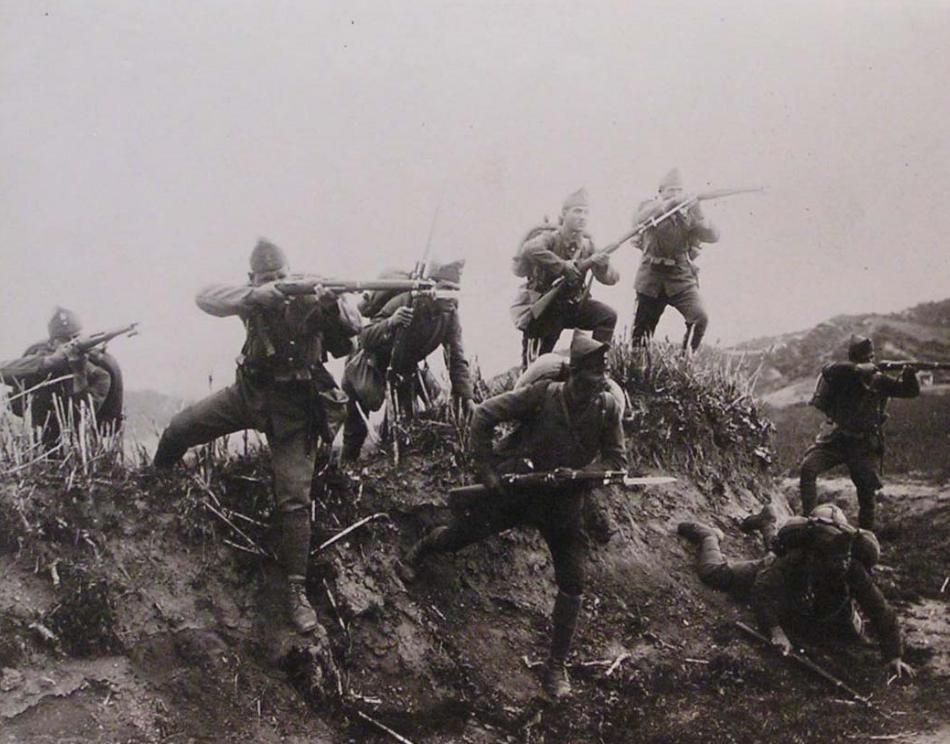
A photograph of Hellenic Army troops advancing on Nationalist positions during the 1920 Greek Summer Offensive

The Greco-Turkish War—referred to as the "Western Front" by the Turks and the "Asia Minor Campaign" by the Greeks—started when Greek forces landed in Smyrna (now İzmir), on 15 May 1919. A perimeter around the city known as the Milne Line was established in which low-intensity guerilla war commenced.

The conflict escalated when Greece and Britain performed a joint offensive over the summer of 1920, which Istanbul condemned, that took control over the Marmara coast and provided strategic depth to the İzmir occupation zone. The cities of İzmit, Manisa, Balıkesir, Aydın, and Bursa were taken with little Turkish resistance.

A second Greek offensive in autumn was launched with the goal to pressure Istanbul and Ankara to sign the Sèvres Treaty. This peace process was temporarily halted with the fall of Venizelos when the pro-Entente King Alexander died from sepsis after being bitten by a monkey. Much to Allied chagrin he was replaced by his anti-Entente father King Constantine. Greece ceased to receive much Allied support after the change in power. The Army of Asia Minor was purged of Venizelist officers, their replacements being less competent.

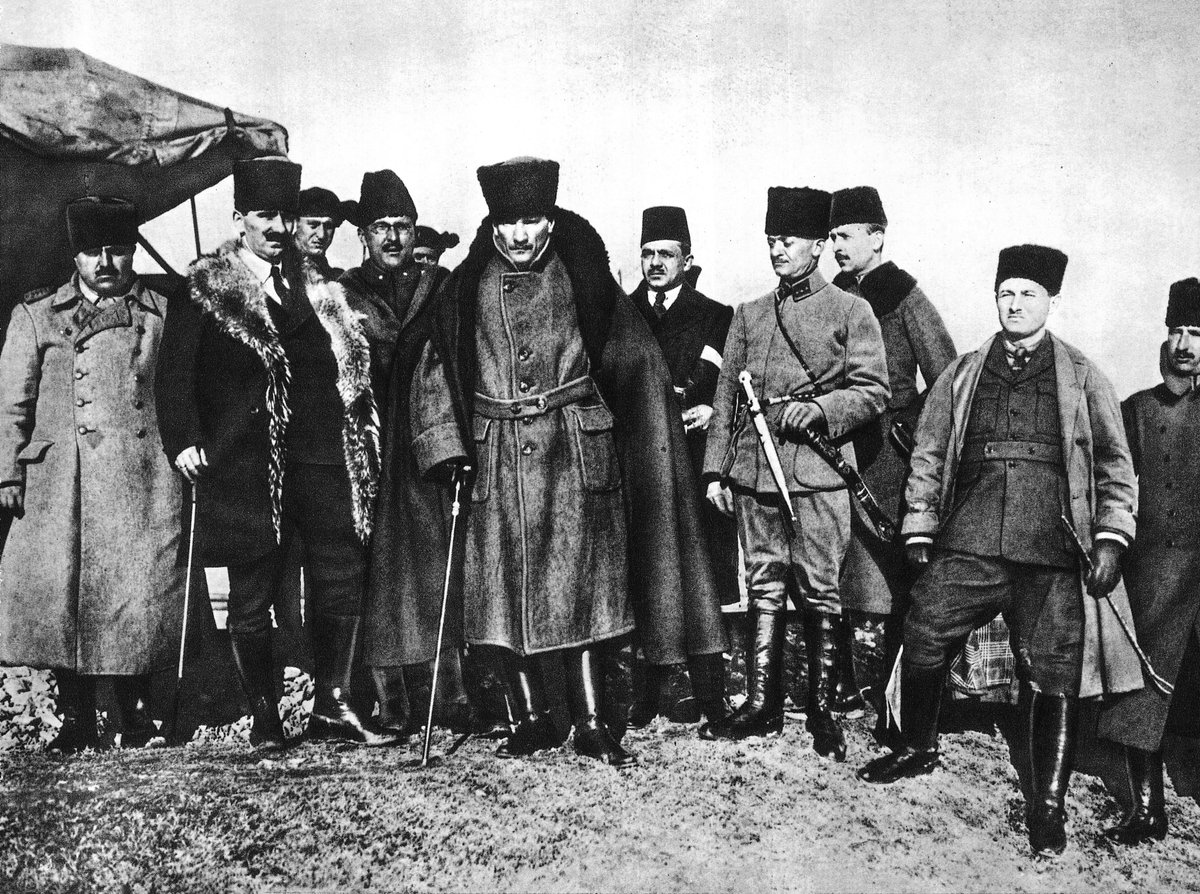
Mustafa Kemal Pasha and his comrades-in-arms at the end of the First Battle of İnönü

When the offensive resumed, the Turks received their first victory when the Greeks encountered stiff resistance in the battles of First and Second İnönü, due to İsmet Pasha's organization of an irregular militia into a regular army. The two victories led to Allied proposals to amend the Treaty of Sèvres where both Ankara and Istanbul were represented, but Greece refused. A Turkish offensive was checked at the Battle of Aslıhanlar–Dumlupınar. With the conclusion of the Southern and Eastern fronts, Ankara was able to concentrate more forces on the West against the Greeks. They also began to receive support from Soviet Union, as well as Italy and France, who sought to check British influence in the Near East.

According to Soviet documents, Soviet financial and war material support between 1920 and 1922 amounted to: 39,000 rifles, 327 machine guns, 54 cannon, 63 million rifle bullets, 147,000 shells, 2 patrol boats, 200.6 kg of gold ingots and 10.7 million Turkish lira (which accounted for a twentieth of the Turkish budget during the war). Additionally the Soviets gave the Turkish nationalists 100,000 gold rubles to help build an orphanage and 20,000 lira to obtain printing house equipment and cinema equipment.

June–July 1921 saw heavy fighting in the Battle of Kütahya-Eskişehir. While it was an eventual Greek victory, the Turkish army withdrew in good order to the Sakarya river, their last line of defence. Mustafa Kemal Pasha replaced İsmet Pasha after the defeat as commander-in-chief as well as his political duties. The decision was made in the Greek military command to march on the Nationalist capital of Ankara to force Mustafa Kemal to the negotiating table. For 21 days, the Turks and Greeks fought a pitched battle at the Sakarya river, which ended in Greek withdrawal. Almost of year of stalemate without much fighting followed, during which Greek morale and discipline faltered while Turkish strength increased. French and Italian forces evacuated Anatolia. The Allies offered an armistice to the Turks, which Mustafa Kemal refused.

==== Peace negotiations and the Great Offensive (1921–1922) ====
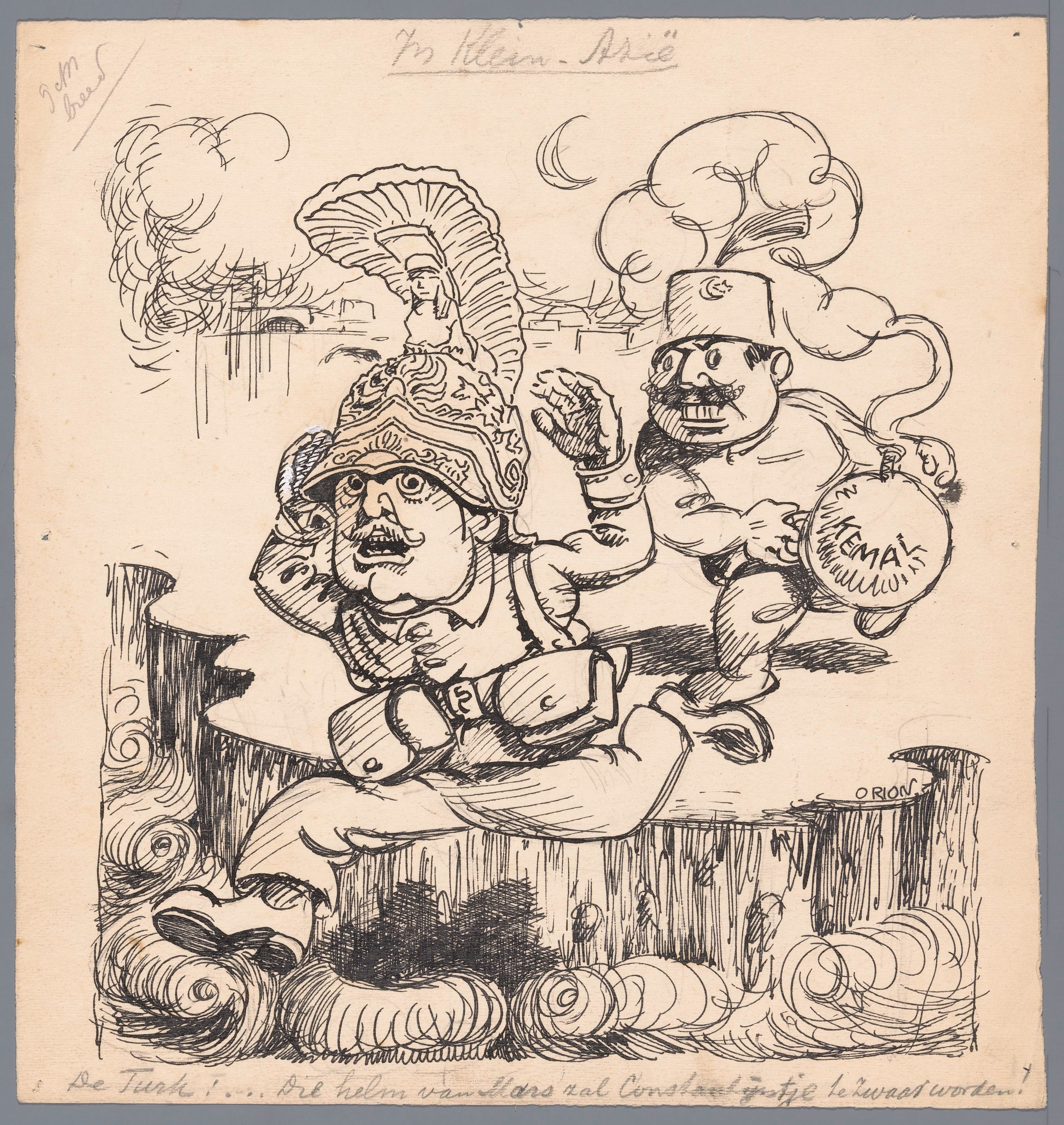
A political cartoon: Greek king Constantine runs away from the bomb which reads "KEMAL"

In salvaging the Treaty of Sèvres, The Triple Entente forced the Turkish revolutionaries to agree with the terms through a series of conferences in London. The conference of London gave the Triple Entente an opportunity to reverse some of its policies. In October, parties to the conference received a report from Admiral Mark Lambert Bristol. He organised a commission to analyse the situation, and inquire into the bloodshed during the Occupation of İzmir and the following activities in the region. The commission reported that if annexation would not follow, Greece should not be the only occupation force in this area. Admiral Bristol was not so sure how to explain this annexation to U.S. President Woodrow Wilson as he insisted on "respect for nationalities" in the Fourteen Points. He believed that the sentiments of the Turks "will never accept this annexation".

Neither the Conference of London nor Admiral Mark Lambert Bristol's report changed British prime minister David Lloyd George's position. On 12 February 1921, he went with the annexation of the Aegean coast which was followed by the Greek offensive. David Lloyd George acted with his sentiments, which were developed during Battle of Gallipoli, as opposed to General Milne, who was his officer on the ground.

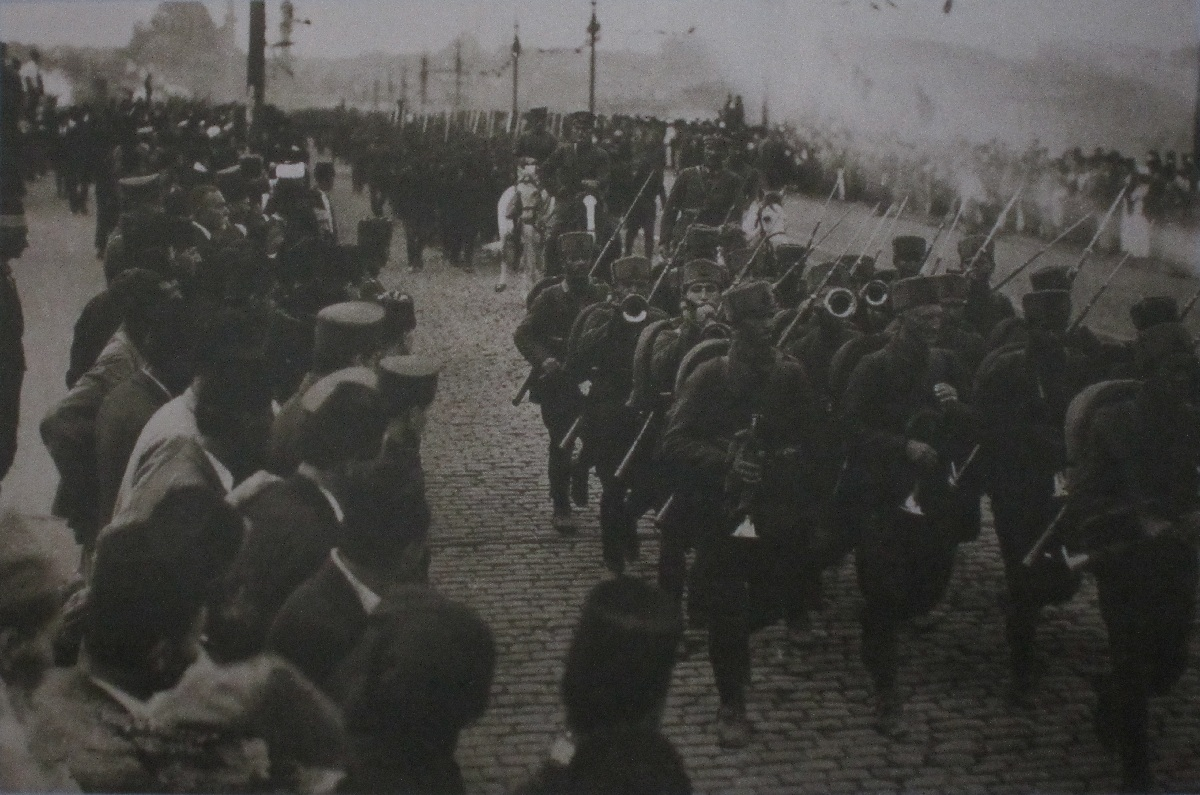
Turkish troops enter Constantinople on 6 October 1923

First negotiations between the sides failed during the Conference of London. The stage for peace was set after the Triple Entente's decision to make an arrangement with the Turkish revolutionaries. Before the talks with the Entente, the Nationalists partially settled their eastern borders with the Democratic Republic of Armenia, signing the Treaty of Alexandropol, but changes in the Caucasus—especially the establishment of the Armenian SSR—required one more round of talks. The outcome was the Treaty of Kars, a successor treaty to the earlier Treaty of Moscow of March 1921. It was signed in Kars with the Russian SFSR on 13 October 1921 and ratified in Yerevan on 11 September 1922.

With the borders secured with treaties and agreements at east and south, Mustafa Kemal was now in a commanding position. On August 26, 1922, in the Battle of Dumlupınar, the Turks routed the Greek positions and launched the Great Offensive. The Nationalists demanded that the Greek army evacuate East Thrace, Imbros, and Tenedos as well as Asia Minor. Mustafa Kemal sent a telegram to his commanders: "Armies! Your first goal is the Mediterranean, onwards!" The Turks recaptured all of Greece's gains in the span of three weeks, and resulted in the recapture of Smyrna by Turkish forces right after which occurred the great fire of Smyrna. Greece's retreat from Anatolia saw its army committing scorched earth tactics and the depopulation of Muslim villages.

The British were prepared to defend the neutral zone of Constantinople and the Straits and the French asked Kemal to respect it, to which he agreed on 28 September. However, France, Italy, Yugoslavia, and the British Dominions objected to a new war. France, Italy and Britain called on Mustafa Kemal to enter into cease-fire negotiations. In return, on 29 September Kemal asked for the negotiations to be started at Mudanya. This was agreed on 11 October, two hours before the British intended to engage Nationalist forces at Çanak, and signed the next day. The Greeks initially refused to agree but did so on 13 October. Factors persuading Turkey to sign may have included the arrival of British reinforcements. With the British government and public firmly anti-war, the Chanak Crisis led to the collapse of David Lloyd George's coalition government.

==== Armistice of Mudanya ====
The Marmara sea resort town of Mudanya hosted the conference to arrange the armistice on 3 October 1922. İsmet Pasha—commander of the western armies—was in front of the Allies. The scene was unlike Mudros as the British and the Greeks were on the defence. Greece was represented by the Allies.

The British still expected the GNA to make concessions. From the first speech, the British were startled as Ankara demanded fulfillment of the National Pact. During the conference, the British troops in Constantinople were preparing for a Kemalist attack. There was never any fighting in Thrace, as Greek units withdrew before the Turks crossed the straits from Asia Minor. The only concession that İsmet made to the British was an agreement that his troops would not advance any farther toward the Dardanelles, which gave a safe haven for the British troops as long as the conference continued. The conference dragged on far beyond the original expectations. In the end, it was the British who yielded to Ankara's advances.

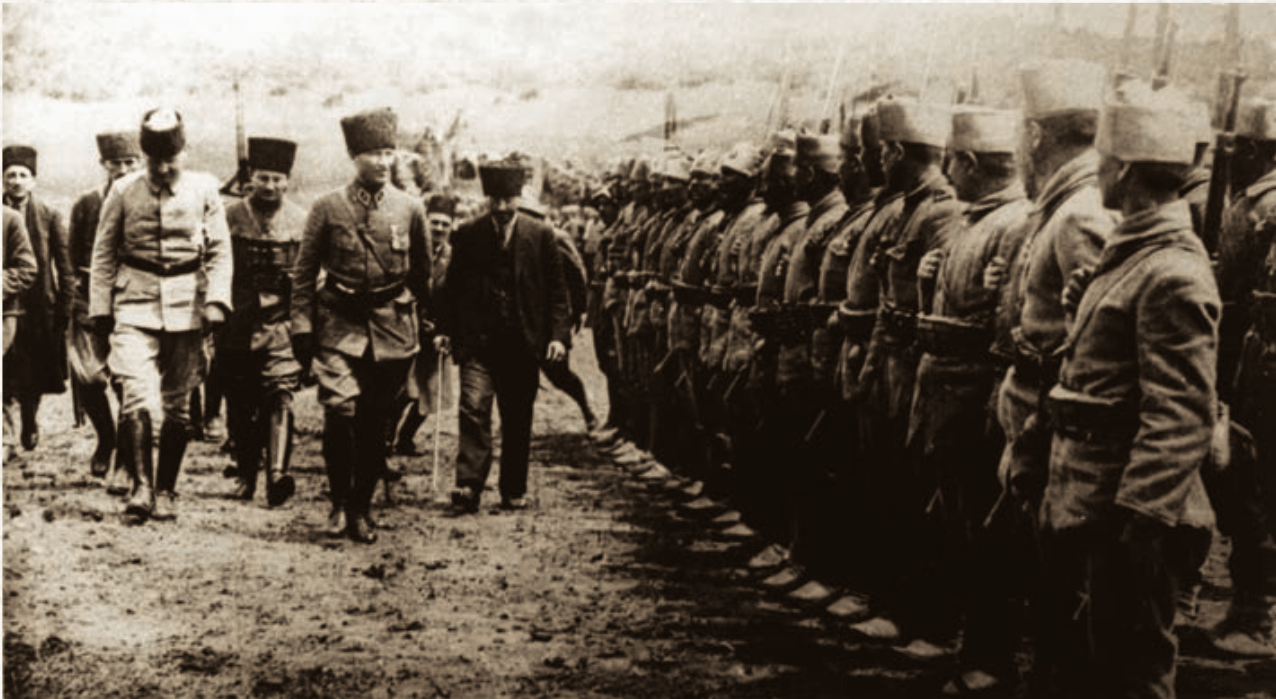
Kemal Pasha inspects the Turkish troops (18 June 1922)

The Armistice of Mudanya was signed on 11 October. By its terms, the Greek army would move west of the Maritsa, clearing eastern Thrace to the Allies. The famous American author Ernest Hemingway was in Thrace at the time, and he covered the evacuation of eastern Thrace of its Greek population. He has several short stories written about Thrace and Smyrna, which appear in his book In Our Time. The agreement came into force starting 15 October. Allied forces would stay in eastern Thrace for a month to assure law and order. In return, Ankara would recognise continued British occupation of Constantinople and the Straits zones until the final treaty was signed.

Refet Bele was assigned to seize control of eastern Thrace from the Allies. He was the first representative to reach the old capital. The British did not allow the hundred gendarmes who came with him. That resistance lasted until the next day.

== Outcome ==
=== Abolition of the sultanate ===
Kemal had long ago made up his mind to abolish the sultanate when the moment was ripe. After facing opposition from some members of the assembly, using his influence as a war hero, he managed to prepare a draft law for the abolition of the sultanate, which was then submitted to the National Assembly for voting. In that article, it was stated that the form of the government in Constantinople, resting on the sovereignty of an individual, had already ceased to exist when the British forces occupied the city after World War I. Furthermore, it was argued that although the caliphate had belonged to the Ottoman Empire, it rested on the Turkish state by its dissolution and Turkish National Assembly would have right to choose a member of the Ottoman family in the office of caliph. On 1 November, The Turkish Grand National Assembly voted to abolish the sultanate. Mehmed VI fled Turkey on 17 November 1922 on HMS Malaya; so ended the over 600 year-old monarchy. Ahmed Tevfik Pasha also resigned as Grand Vizier (Prime Minister) a couple days later, without a replacement.

=== Treaty of Lausanne ===
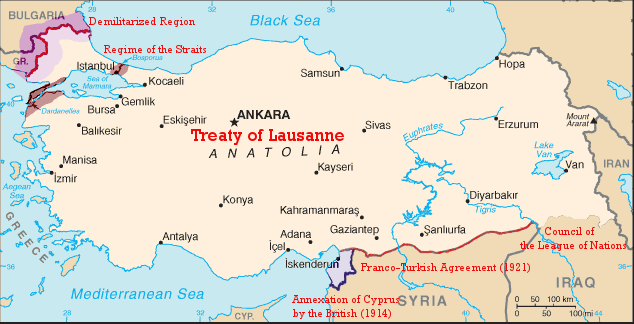
The Treaty of Lausanne, signed in 1923 that guaranteed Turkey's independence, replacing the Treaty of Sèvres

The Conference of Lausanne began on 21 November 1922 in Lausanne, Switzerland and lasted into 1923. Its purpose was the negotiation of a treaty to replace the Treaty of Sèvres, which, under the new government of the Grand National Assembly, was no longer recognised by Turkey. İsmet Pasha was the leading Turkish negotiator. İsmet maintained the basic position of the Ankara government that it had to be treated as an independent and sovereign state, equal with all other states attending the conference. In accordance with the directives of Mustafa Kemal, while discussing matters regarding the control of Turkish finances and justice, the Capitulations, the Turkish Straits and the like, he refused any proposal that would compromise Turkish sovereignty. Finally, after long debates, on 24 July 1923, the Treaty of Lausanne was signed. Ten weeks after the signature the Allied forces left Istanbul.

The conference opened with representatives from the United Kingdom, France, Italy and Turkey. It heard speeches from Benito Mussolini of Italy and Raymond Poincaré of France. At its conclusion, Turkey assented to the political clauses and the "freedom of the straits", which was Britain's main concern. The matter of the status of Mosul was deferred, since Curzon refused to be budged on the British position that the area was part of Iraq. The British Iraq Mandate's possession of Mosul was confirmed by a League of Nations brokered agreement between Turkey and Great Britain in 1926. The French delegation, however, did not achieve any of their goals and on 30 January 1923 issued a statement that they did not consider the draft treaty to be any more than a "basis of discussion". The Turks therefore refused to sign the treaty. On 4 February 1923, Curzon made a final appeal to İsmet Pasha to sign, and when he refused the Foreign Secretary broke off negotiations and left that night on the Orient Express.

The Treaty of Lausanne, finally signed in July 1923, led to international recognition of the Grand National Assembly as the legitimate government of Turkey and sovereignty of the Republic of Turkey as the successor state to the defunct Ottoman Empire. Most goals on the condition of sovereignty were granted to Turkey. In addition to Turkey's more favourable land borders compared with Treaty of Sèvres (as can be seen in the picture to the right), capitulations were abolished, the issue of Mosul would be decided by a League of Nations plebiscite in 1926, while the border with Greece and Bulgaria would become demilitarised. The Turkish Straits would be under an international commission which gave Turkey more of a voice (this arrangement would be replaced by the Montreux Convention in 1936). The Maritsa (Meriç) River would again become the western border of Turkey, as it was before 1914.

=== Establishment of the Republic ===
Turkey was proclaimed a Republic on 29 October 1923, with Mustafa Kemal Pasha was elected as the first President. In forming his government, he placed Mustafa Fevzi (Çakmak), Köprülü Kâzım (Özalp), and İsmet (İnönü) in important positions. They helped him to establish his subsequent political and social reforms in Turkey, transforming the country into a modern and secular nation state.

== Historiography ==
=== Turkish historiography ===
==== Turkish official views ====
The orthodox Turkish perspective on the war is based primarily on the speeches (see Nutuk) and narratives of Mustafa Kemal Atatürk, a high-ranking officer in World War I and the leader of the Nationalist Movement. Kemal was characterized as the founder and sole leader of the Nationalist Movement. Potentially negative facts were omitted in the orthodox historiography. This interpretation had a tremendous influence on the perception of Turkish history, even by foreign researchers. The more recent historiography has come to understand the Kemalist version as a nationalist framing of events and movements leading to the republic's founding. This was accomplished by sidelining unwanted elements which had links to the detested and genocidal CUP, and thus elevating Kemal and his policies.

From the Turkish perspective, the term "Kurtuluş Savaşı" ("Liberation War"/"War of Independence") is widely defended, as the overwhelming majority of Turks view the event as a liberation from a foreign occupation. A speech delivered by Mustafa Kemal on 24 April 1920, to the newly established Ankara government, summed up the Turkish perspective of the situation: "It is known to all that the seat of the Caliphate and the Government is under temporary occupation by foreign forces and that our independence is greatly restricted. Submitting to these conditions would mean national acceptance of a slavery proposed to us by foreign powers." The Treaty of Sèvres further promoted the Turkish narrative of the need to "liberate" the country. Should no action be taken, they believed, the Turkish state would be reduced to rump state in central Anatolia under heavy foreign influence.

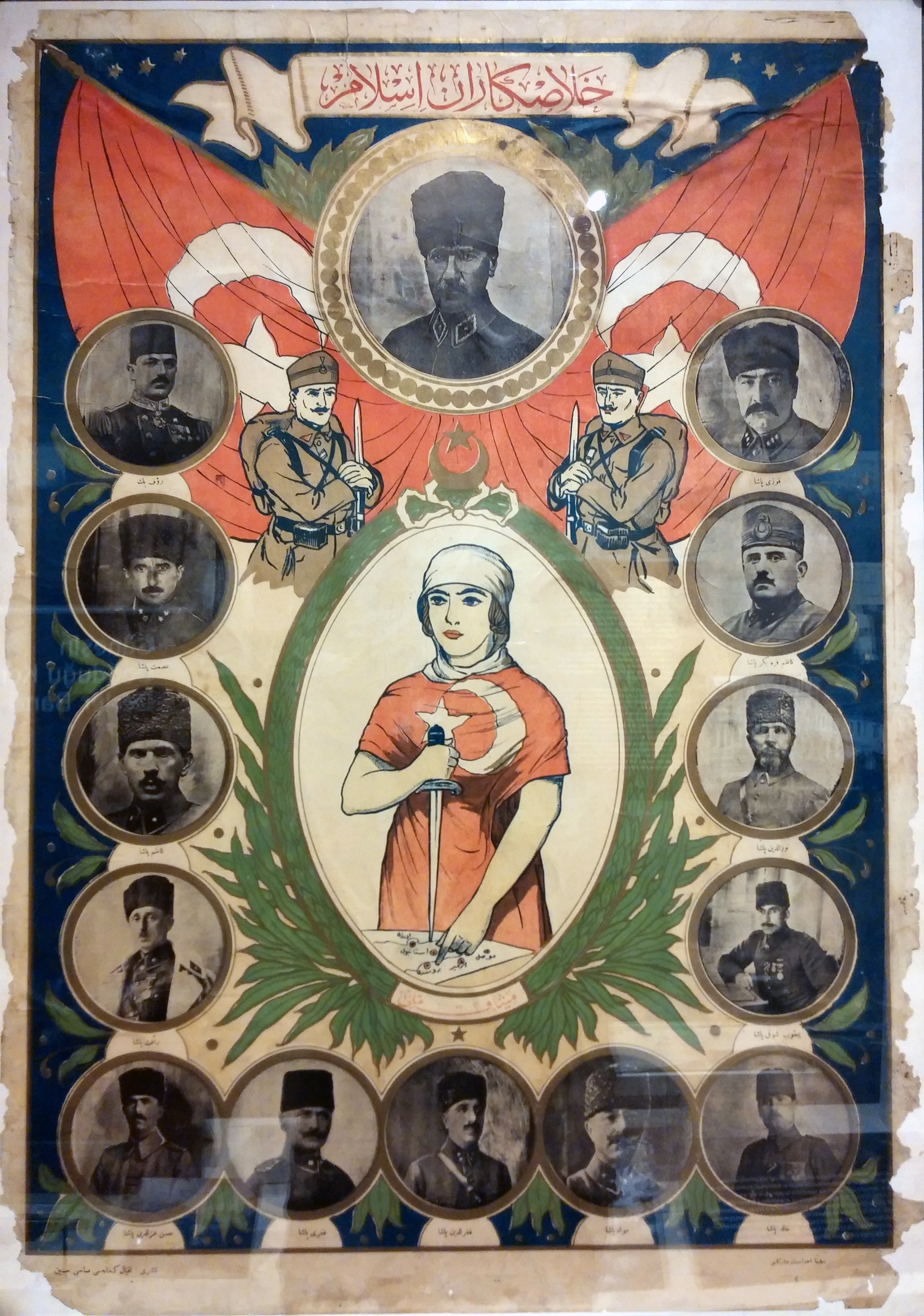
Propaganda poster of the Turkish National Movement

According to Mesut Uyar, the Turkish War of Independence was also a civil war which took place in Southern Marmara, Western and Eastern Black Sea, and Central Anatolia regions. He states that its aspect as a civil war is pushed into the background in official and academic books as 'revolts'. The losers of civil war who neither supported sultan nor Ankara Government, which they considered a continuation of CUP, did not consider themselves rebels. He further emphasizes that casualties and financial losses that occurred in the civil war is at least as catastrophic as the war that was fought against the enemies in other fronts. Thus, he concludes that the war was similar to the Russian Revolution.

==== Turkish Islamist views ====
During the war, nationalists referred to it as "jihad". Islamic religious terminology was heavily used during the war and its mobilization efforts. As such, Turkish Islamists believe that Mustafa Kemal exploited Islamic religiosity throughout the war, then turned against Islam after the victory. In addition, they view the Treaty of Lausanne as a Western "conspiracy", a failure of Kemal's nationalists and a concession against the Misak-ı Millî, resulting in the loss of the empire's possessions in the Aegean islands, Western Thrace, and the Middle East.

Islamist discourse also claims that true secularism was never practiced in Turkey and that the country experienced a "religious system tied to the state", which they consider alien to both Islam and secularism, as well as to democracy.

=== Independent views ===
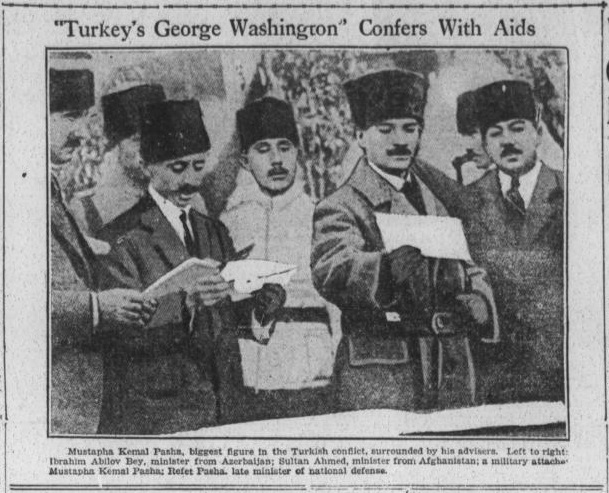
The Abilene Daily Reporter based in Texas, U.S., called Mustafa Kemal "Turkey's George Washington" on 13 October 1922

Considering the nature of the war (for example, incomparability of foreign military losses and civilian deaths among Christian minorities), the appropriateness of the term "Turkish Liberation War" (Turkish: Türk Kurtuluş Savaşı) or "Turkish War of Independence" is disputed by several Turkish and Western historians.

Historian Uğur Ümit Üngör states that "As such, the Greco-Turkish and Armeno-Turkish wars (1919–1923) were in essence processes of state formation that represented a continuation of ethnic unmixing and exclusion of Ottoman Christians from Anatolia. The subsequent proclamation of a Turkish nation state on 29 October 1923 was more of an intermezzo than a start or an end". Turkish academic Attila Tuygan in his monograph "Genocide for the Motherland" wrote that: "The statement that the Turkish national liberation war was waged against imperialism is based on nothing". On the contrary, he writes, as noted by Professor Taner Akçam, the liberation war "was fought not against aggressors, but against minorities".

Preference of this term has also been criticized by historian Corry Guttstadt as it causes Turkey to be portrayed as "a victim of imperialist forces". In this version of events, minority groups are depicted as a pawn used by these "imperialist forces", despite the fact that Ottoman Empire itself had joined the First World War with imperialist and expansionist goals. The CUP government intended to expand the Empire into Central Asia. However, when they were defeated, their Kemalist successors depicted themselves as the victims, even though the war brought catastrophic consequences for non-Muslim minorities, against which it was actually conducted.

In the orthodox Turkish version of events, the Nationalist Movement broke with its defective past and took its strength from popular support led by Kemal, consequently giving him the surname Atatürk, meaning "Father of Turks". According to historians such as Donald Bloxham, E.J. Zürcher, and Taner Akçam, this was not the case in reality, and a nationalist movement emerged through the backing of leaders of CUP, of whom many were war criminals, people who became wealthy with confiscated equities and they were not on trial for their crimes owing to the accelerating support for the National Movement. Kemalist figures, including many old members of the CUP, ended up writing the majority of the history of the war. The modern understanding in Turkey is greatly influenced by this nationalist and politically motivated history. Two of the architects of the Armenian genocide, Talaat Pasha and Djemal Pasha, supported Kemal's leadership of the Turkish National Movement. Talaat personally instructed Mustafa Vasif, the leader of the Karakol Society, to accept Mustafa Kemal as leader, while Djemal, too, supported Kemal and tried to coordinate his movements with the Turkish National Movement. Enver Pasha supported the war, but opposed Kemal. Enver promoted pan-Turkist and pan-Islamist ideas during the war, while Kemal feared that overemphasis on pan-Turkism and pan-Islamism might alienate their Bolshevik supporters.

Armenian historian Richard G. Hovannisian writes that the Italians were "currying favor" with Turkish Nationalist forces by allowing "clandestine sale and shipment of arms" to them.

== Consequences ==
=== Ethnic cleansing ===
Historian Erik Sjöberg concludes that "It seems, in the end, unlikely that the Turkish Nationalist leaders, though secular in name, ever had any intention of allowing any sizeable non-Muslim minority to remain." According to Rıza Nur, one of the Turkish delegates at Lausanne, wrote that "disposing of people of different races, languages and religions in our country is the most ... vital issue". Many Greek men were conscripted into unarmed labor battalions where the death rate sometimes exceeded 90 percent. Raymond Kévorkian states that "removing non-Turks from the sanctuary of Anatolia continued to be one of" the Turkish Nationalists' main activities after World War I. Preventing Armenians and other Christians from returning home, and therefore allowing their properties to be retained by those who had stolen them during the war, was a key factor in securing popular support for the Turkish Nationalist Movement. Christian civilians were subjected to forced deportation to expel them from the country, a policy that continued after the war. These deportations were similar to those employed during the Armenian Genocide and caused many deaths. Over 1 million Greeks were expelled as were all remaining Armenians in the areas of Diyarbekir, Mardin, Urfa, Harput, and Malatia—forced across the border into French-mandate Syria. Greek and Armenian civilians were massacred in the fire of Smyrna and later during the Turkish invasion of Armenia.

Vahagn Avedian argues that the Turkish War of Independence was not directed against the Allied Powers, but that its main objective was to get rid of non-Turkish minority groups. The Nationalist movement maintained the aggressive policy of the CUP against Christians. It was stated in a secret telegram from Foreign Minister Ahmet Muhtar (Mollaoğlu) to Kazım Karabekir in mid-1921 "the most important thing is to eliminate Armenia, both politically and materially". Avedian holds that the existence of the Armenian Republic was considered as the "greatest threat" for the continuation of Turkish state, and that for this reason, they "fulfilled the genocidal policy of its CUP predecessor". After the Christian population was destroyed, the focus shifted to the Kurdish population. Ethnic cleansing was also carried against Pontic Greeks with the collaboration with Ankara and Istanbul governments.

=== Turkey ===
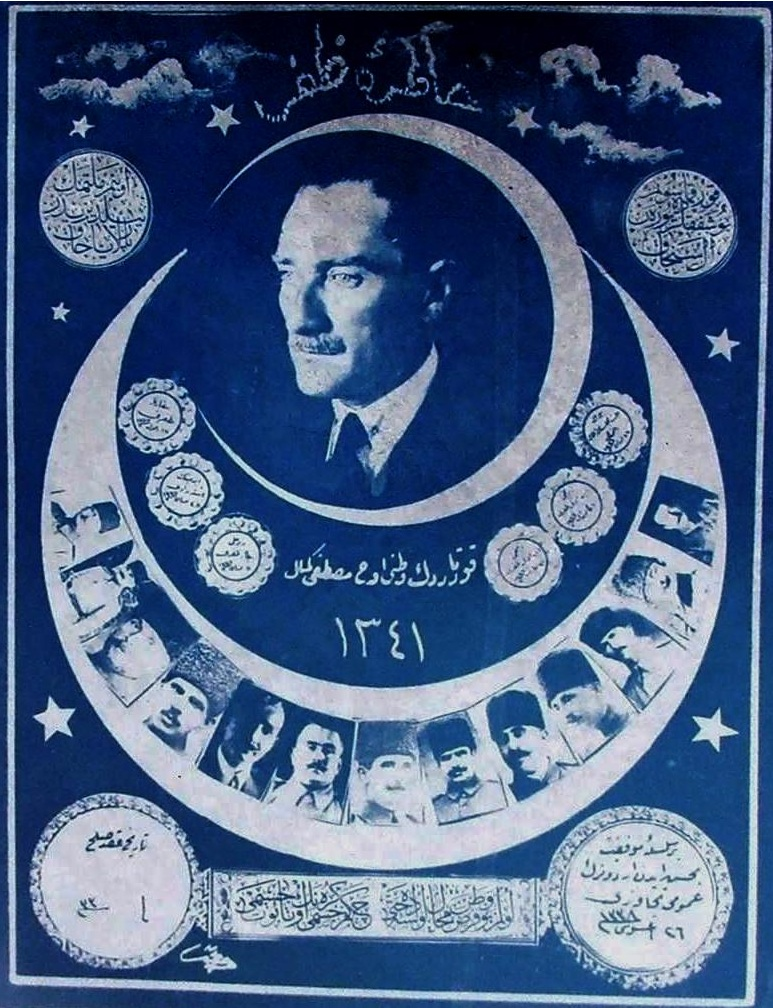
Hatıra-i Zafer (Memory of Victory) by Hasan Sabri in 1925.

The Grand National Assembly transitioned from a provisional counsel to being Turkey's primary legislative body. In 1923, A-RMHC changed its name to the People's Party. A couple years later, the name would be changed again by Mustafa Kemal to the Republican People's Party (Cumhuriyet Halk Partisi, CHP), one of Turkey's major political parties as well as its oldest. CHP went on to rule Turkey as a one party state until the 1946 general election.

=== Aftermath of the Chanak Crisis ===
In addition to toppling the British government, the Chanak Crisis would have far reaching consequences on British dominion policy. As the Dominion of Canada did not see itself committed to support a potential British war with Kemal's GNA, dominion foreign policy would become less committed for security for the British Empire. This attitude of no commitment to the Empire would be a defining moment in Canada's gradual movement towards independence as well as the decline of the British Empire.

=== Influence on other nations ===
The media in Weimar Germany covered the events in Anatolia extensively. Stefan Ihrig argues that Turkish War of Independence had a more definite effect on the Beer Hall Putsch than Mussolini's March on Rome. Germans, including Adolf Hitler, wanted to abolish the Treaty of Versailles just like the Treaty of Sèvres was abolished. After the failed putsch media coverage on the war ceased.

== List of battles ==
=== Greco–Turkish battles ===
| Battle | Year | Greek commanders | Turkish commanders | Result |
|---|---|---|---|---|
| Greek landing at Smyrna | 1919 | Nikolaos Zafeiriou | Nureddin Pasha; Ali Bey | Greek victory |
| Battle of Bergama | 1919 | Charalambos Tseroulis | Kemal Muratoğlu | Greek victory |
| Battle of Aydın | 1919 | Georgios Kondylis | Yörük Ali Efe | Greek victory |
| Greek Summer Offensive | 1920 | Leonidas Paraskevopoulos; Dimitrios Ioannou | Ali Fuat Pasha; Çerkes Ethem | Greek victory |
| Battle of the Gediz | 1920 | Konstantinos Manetas | Ali Fuat Pasha; Çerkes Ethem | Greek victory |
| First Battle of İnönü | 1921 | Anastasios Papoulas | İsmet Pasha | Inconclusive/Stalemate |
| Second Battle of İnönü | 1921 | Anastasios Papoulas | İsmet Pasha | Turkish victory |
| Battle of Aslıhanlar–Dumlupınar | 1921 | Alexandros Kontoulis; Dimosthenis Dialetis | Refet Pasha | Greek victory |
| Battle of Kütahya–Eskişehir | 1921 | Anastasios Papoulas; Constantine I | İsmet Pasha | Greek victory |
| Battle of the Sakarya | 1921 | Anastasios Papoulas | Mustafa Kemal Pasha; Fevzi Pasha; İsmet Pasha | Stalemate |
| Battle of Dumlupınar | 1922 | Georgios Hatzianestis; Nikolaos Trikoupis; Kimon Digenis | Mustafa Kemal Pasha; Fevzi Pasha; İsmet Pasha | Turkish victory |

=== Armeno–Turkish battles ===
| Battle | Year | Armenian commanders | Turkish commanders | Result |
|---|---|---|---|---|
| Battle of Sarikamish | 1920 | — | Kâzım Karabekir; Halit Karsıalan | Turkish victory |
| Battle of Kars | 1920 | Movses Silikyan; Daniel Bek-Pirumyan | Kâzım Karabekir; Halit Karsıalan | Turkish victory |
| Battle of Alexandropol | 1920 | Drastamat Kanayan | Kâzım Karabekir | Turkish victory |

=== Franco–Turkish battles ===
| Battle | Year | French commanders | Turkish commanders | Result |
|---|---|---|---|---|
| Battle of Marash | 1920 | General Quérette; Lieutenant Colonel Robert Normand | Arslan Bey; Kılıç Ali | Turkish victory |
| Battle of Urfa | 1920 | Major G. Hauger | Ali Saip Bey | Turkish victory |
| Karboğazı ambush | 1920 | Major Mesnil; Georges Journois | Kemal Bey; Bucaklı Hasan Ağa | Turkish victory |
| Battle of Kovanbaşı | 1920 | — | — | Turkish victory |
| Battle of Kanlı Geçit | 1920 | — | Aşir Bey | Turkish victory |
| Siege of Aintab | 1920–1921 | Henri Gouraud; Fernand Goubeau | Mustafa Hilmi Pasha; Kılıç Ali; Şefik Özdemir Bey | French victory |

== See also ==
- Timeline of the Turkish War of Independence
- List of media during the Turkish War of Independence
- List of films about the Turkish War of Independence
- Medal of Independence
- List of Ottoman Grand Viziers#Second Constitutional Monarchy
- List of political parties in the Ottoman Empire#Armistice era and Independence war parties (1918–1922)
- Independence Tribunals
- Izmir Economic Congress
- Young Turk Revolution
- 31 March Incident
- Celali rebellions
- List of modern conflicts in the Middle East
- Efe (zeybek)
- Miralay Sadık
- Hungarian–Romanian War

== Bibliography ==
- Barber, Noel (1988). Lords of the Golden Horn: From Suleiman the Magnificent to Kamal Ataturk. London: Arrow. ISBN 978-0-09-953950-6.
- Bardakçı, Murat (1998). Şahbaba: Osmanoğulları'nın Son Hükümdarı Vahdettin'in Hayatı, Hatıraları ve Özel Mektupları. Pan Yayıncılık-İnkılâp Kitabevi. ISBN 9751024536.
- Gingeras, Ryan (2022). The Last Days of the Ottoman Empire. Dublin: Random House. ISBN 978-0-241-44432-0.
- Gingeras, Ryan (2014). Heroin, Organized Crime, and the Making of Modern Turkey. Oxford: Oxford University Press. ISBN 978-0-19-871602-0.
- Dobkin, Marjorie Housepian, Smyrna: 1922 The Destruction of City (Newmark Press: New York, 1988). ISBN 0-966 7451-0-8.
- Kinross, Patrick (2003). Atatürk: The Rebirth of a Nation. London: Phoenix Press. ISBN 978-1-84212-599-1. OCLC 55516821.
- Kinross, Patrick (1979). The Ottoman Centuries: The Rise and Fall of the Turkish Empire. New York: Morrow. ISBN 978-0-688-08093-8.
- Landis, Dan; Albert, Rosita, eds. (2012). Handbook of Ethnic Conflict:International Perspectives. Springer. p. 264. ISBN 9781461404477.
- Lengyel, Emil (1962). They Called Him Atatürk. New York: The John Day Co. OCLC 1337444.
- Mango, Andrew (2002) [1999]. Ataturk: The Biography of the Founder of Modern Turkey (Paperback ed.). Woodstock, NY: Overlook Press, Peter Mayer Publishers, Inc. ISBN 1-58567-334-X.
- Mango, Andrew, The Turks Today (New York: The Overlook Press, 2004). ISBN 1-58567-615-2.
- Milton, Giles (2008). Paradise Lost: Smyrna 1922: The Destruction of Islam's City of Tolerance (Paperback ed.). London: Sceptre; Hodder & Stoughton Ltd. ISBN 978-0-340-96234-3.
- Sjöberg, Erik (2016). Making of the Greek Genocide: Contested Memories of the Ottoman Greek Catastrophe. Berghahn Books. ISBN 978-1785333255.
- Travlos, Konstantinos (2020). Salvation and Catastrophe: The Greek-Turkish War, 1919–1922. Lexington Books. ISBN 9781498585088.
- Pope, Nicole and Pope, Hugh, Turkey Unveiled: A History of Modern Turkey (New York: The Overlook Press, 2004). ISBN 1-58567-581-4.
- Yapp, Malcolm (1987). The Making of the Modern Near East, 1792–1923. London; New York: Longman. ISBN 978-0-582-49380-3.
- Zürcher, Erik (1993). Turkey: A Modern History. London, New York: I.B. Tauris. ISBN 1-86064-222-5.
- Gogolishvili, Otar (2019). "Heroes of Batumi, Events of March 18-20 March in 1921: Summery". Politics (in Georgian). Tbilisi: Tbilisi State University.
