= Alexandros Kontoulis =

Greek general (1859–1933)

- Αλέξανδρος Κοντούλης
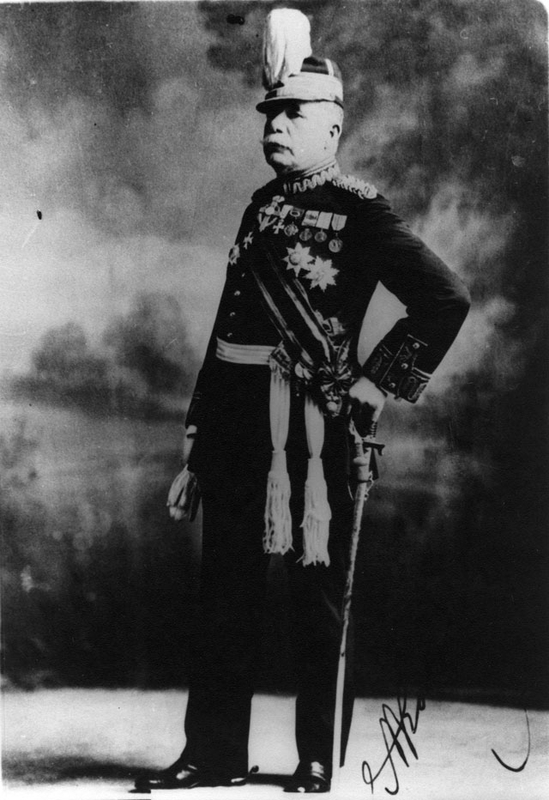
- Kontoulis c. 1920s
- Born: 10 January [O.S. 29 December 1858] 1859; Eleusis, Kingdom of Greece
- Died: 22 August 1933 (aged 74); Athens, Second Hellenic Republic
- Military career
- Allegiance: Kingdom of Greece
- Branch: Hellenic Army
- Service years: 1880–1917; 1920–1923
- Rank: Lieutenant general
- Nickname: Kapetan Skourtis (Καπετάν Σκούρτης)
- Unit: Army of Epirus
- Commands: I Army Corps
- Conflicts: Epirus Revolt (1878); Greco-Turkish War (1897); Battle of Velestino; Macedonian Struggle; Balkan Wars; First Balkan War; Battle of Bizani; World War I; National Schism; Noemvriana; Greco-Turkish War (1919–1922); First Battle of İnönü; Battle of Aslıhanlar–Dumlupınar; Battle of Kütahya–Eskişehir; Battle of the Sakarya
- Awards: Order of the Redeemer; Gold Cross of Valour; Medal of Military Merit
- Other work: Military Governor of Korytsa; Ambassador to Albania

Alexandros Kontoulis (Greek: Αλέξανδρος Κοντούλης, 1859–1933) was a Greek military officer who rose to the rank of lieutenant general in the Hellenic Army. He was among the driving minds behind the Macedonian Struggle and was involved in the Albanian national movement, with the nom de guerre of Kapetan Skourtis (Καπετάν Σκούρτης). Kontoulis fought with distinction in the Greco-Turkish War of 1897 and the First Balkan War, where he was heavily wounded. In the Greco-Turkish War of 1919–1922, he commanded the I Army Corps on the southern sector of the Greek front from February 1921 to June 1922. After his retirement, he served as ambassador to Albania.

== Early life and career ==
Alexandros Kontoulis was born in Eleusis on 10 January [O.S. 29 December 1858] 1859 or 22 April [O.S. 10 April] 1858. His family were Arvanites, attested in the region around Elefsina since the turn of the 19th century. At the age of 20, he participated as a volunteer in the failed uprising in Epirus against the Ottoman Empire. Kontoulis and many of the Greek volunteers were arrested and sentenced to death by the Ottomans, but eventually pardoned at the intercession of the British government. Released from Ottoman captivity, on 17 July 1880 he enlisted in the Hellenic Army. He entered the NCO School in 1883 and graduated on 22 September 1885 as a 2nd Lieutenant of the Infantry. In 1886, he fought in the clashes between Greek and Ottoman troops on their frontier in Thessaly. After that, he was included in the Austrian military geographical training mission that was sent to Greece to help found the Hellenic Army's geographical service. Promoted to Lieutenant on 26 May 1895, during the Greco-Turkish War of 1897, Kontoulis distinguished himself at the Battle of Velestino, where his commanding officer, Colonel Konstantinos Smolenskis, requested his promotion and the award of the Order of the Redeemer for exceptional bravery.

== Macedonian Struggle and Albania ==
Kontoulis was promoted to captain on 24 March 1899. At the same time, along with Pavlos Melas, he became a leading member in the secret nationalistic society, the Ethniki Etaireia, and after the society's dissolution in 1900, in the aftermath of the defeat of the 1897 war, he served for ten years as the chairman of the Panhellenic Shooting Society, which largely succeeded the former in its activities. Due to his own Arvanite origin and association with the Greek nationalistic circles of Athens, Kontoulis was deeply interested in the rising Albanian nationalism and quest for independence, and maintained contacts with the Albanian leader Ismail Qemali.

From 1903, however, his contacts with Melas and Ion Dragoumis led him to focus on the Macedonian Question. After contacts with the bishop of Kastoria, Germanos Karavangelis, Kontoulis became an ardent supporter of sending of armed bands to Ottoman-ruled Macedonia to counter the pro-Bulgarian "armed propaganda" of the Internal Macedonian Revolutionary Organization (IMRO). At the same time, he took over as foster father the care of several children of pro-Greek fighters in Macedonia, including the sons of Konstantinos Christou (Kapetan Kottas), whose biography he later wrote. Along with Melas and Captains Anastasios Papoulas and Georgios Kolokotronis, Kontoulis (with the nom de guerre of Kapetan Skourtis) was one of the four officers sent by the Greek government in early March 1904 to reconnoitre the situation in Macedonia and lay the groundwork for the subsequent "Macedonian Struggle" by Greek armed bands against their Bulgarian rivals.

After his return to Greece, he was promoted to major on 15 October 1908 and lieutenant colonel on 6 July 1911. During this time, Kontoulis kept up his contacts with Ismail Qemali, acting as his intermediary with the Greek government. When the Albanian rebellion at Malësia broke out in 1911, Kontoulis, once again under his old nom-de-guerre of Skourtis, went to Scodra and the Montenegrin capital Cetinje, urging the Christians of the region to defect from the Ottoman army and likewise press for concessions to the religious and national minorities from the Ottoman government. Qemali also signed to a proposal by Kontoulis and Dragoumis for an "Eastern Federation" of the nations of the Ottoman Balkans.

== Balkan Wars and Asia Minor ==
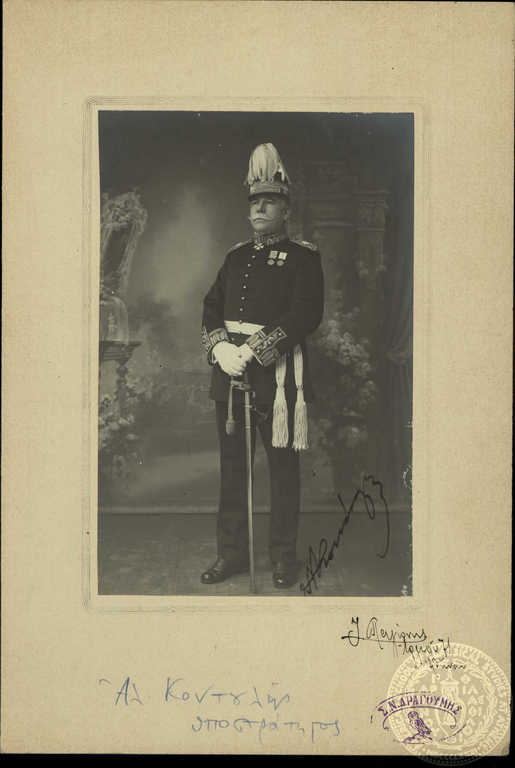
Kontoulis in 1915.

During the subsequent Balkan Wars, Kontoulis commanded an independent Evzone detachment in the Army of Epirus. He distinguished himself during the bloody battle for Aetorrachi heights, when he continued fighting despite being wounded. During the offensive against the Bizani fortress on 3 December 1912, however, he was heavily wounded and hospitalized. After convalescing, he was appointed military governor of Korytsa in Northern Epirus. He was promoted to full Colonel on 21 May 1913.

During World War I and the National Schism, Kontoulis remained loyal to King Constantine I, and fought in the Noemvriana against the French. He was promoted to major general on 21 May 1917. After the ousting of Constantine in June 1917, like many monarchist soldiers, Kontoulis was sidelined, and returned to active service only after the monarchist electoral victory in November 1920 against Eleftherios Venizelos.

By that time, Greece was embroiled in the Greco-Turkish War of 1919–1922 against Kemal Atatürk's Ankara-based Turkish nationalist movement. In early 1921, Kontoulis replaced the Venizelist general Konstantinos Nider in command of I Army Corps. During the March 1921 offensive, he was successful in breaking through the Turkish lines at Dumlupınar and capturing Afyonkarahisar. The retreat of III Army Corps in the northern sector of the offensive (First Battle of İnönü) forced him to withdraw back to the Dumlupınar lines. In the Battle of Aslıhanlar–Dumlupınar, he repulsed repeated Turkish assaults. Kontoulis led the I Corps again with success during the Battle of Kütahya–Eskişehir, during the subsequent march through the salt desert around Lake Tuz towards Ankara, and in the decisive Battle of the Sakarya and the subsequent Greek retreat. He was named Lt. General on 6 October 1921, and in May 1922, he was replaced as commander by Lt. General Nikolaos Trikoupis, returning to Greece, where he went into retirement on 24 April 1923.

== Retirement, Ambassador to Albania and death ==
Unlike many military officers, Kontoulis refused to be drawn into the political turmoil that engulfed the country following the disastrous defeat of the Hellenic Army by the forces of Kemal in August 1922. After his retirement, he was offered the position of ambassador to Albania, a position which he initially declined but eventually accepted in 1925 and held until 1926. During his retirement he lived in Piraeus, he put together a considerable personal archive, and was engaged a chairman in the editorial committee that published the Great Military and Naval Encyclopedia in 1929–1930.

He died on 22 August 1933.

== Sources ==
- Polychronopoulou-Klada, Nika (2000). Στρατηγός Αλέξανδρος Κοντούλης (1858–1933) και το γενικό ευρετήριο του αρχείου του [General Alexandros Kontoulis (1858–1933) and the general index of his archive] (in Greek). Athens: Εταιρεία των Φίλων του Λαού.
- Sokos, Georgios I. (1929). "Κοντούλης Ἀλέξανδρος". Μεγάλη Στρατιωτικὴ καὶ Ναυτικὴ Ἐγκυκλοπαιδεία. Tόμος Τέταρτος: Καβάδης–Μωριάς [Great Military and Naval Encyclopaedia. Volume IV: Kavadh–Morea] (in Greek). Athens: Ἔκδοσις Μεγάλης Στρατιωτικῆς καὶ Ναυτικῆς Ἐγκυκλοπαιδείας. pp. 190–191. OCLC 31255024.
