= Army of Asia Minor =

Field army of the Hellenic Army

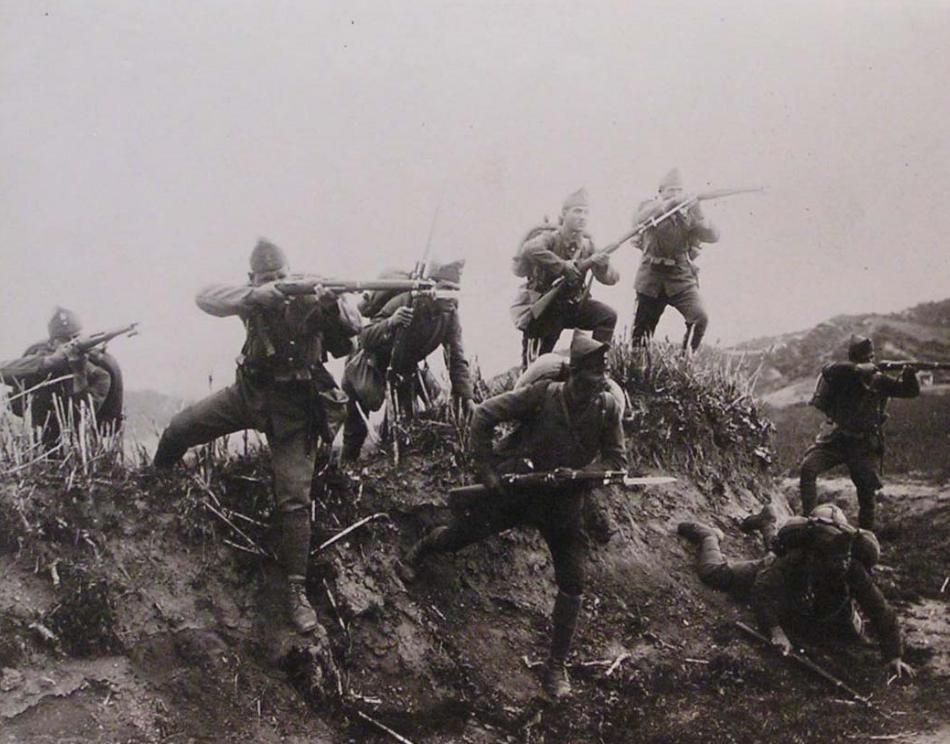
Hellenic Army troops in Anatolia during the Greco-Turkish War of 1919–1922

The Army of Asia Minor (Greek: Στρατιά Μικράς Ασίας) was a field army of the Hellenic Army which was stationed in Anatolia during the Greco-Turkish War of 1919–1922.

== History ==
=== 1919 ===
Following the Greek landing at Smyrna by the 1st Infantry Division on 2 May 1919 (O.S.), Greek forces under the command of the division's CO, Colonel Nikolaos Zafeiriou, began extending their control over the city's hinterland. In the face of mounting opposition by Turkish irregular forces, the division was reinforced by further units (5th and 6th Archipelago Regiments, 8th Cretan Regiment, 3rd Cavalry Regiment and additional gendarmerie and security forces). Command of these forces, the Army of Occupation (Στρατός Κατοχής), was assumed on 2 June by Lt. General Konstantinos Nider, CO of the I Army Corps, which had just returned from its participation in the Allied intervention in Ukraine.

Continuing operations led to the further increase of the Greek forces in the region, which by the end of June comprised the 1st, 2nd, 13th, Archipelago and Smyrna divisions. Between 29 June and 29 July, command of the sweep operations against the Turkish forces was assumed by the Commander-in-chief of the Greek Army, Lt. General Leonidas Paraskevopoulos. The line reached during this period, called "Milne Line" after the Allied C-in-C, George Milne, would form the boundary of the Greek-controlled "Smyrna Zone" until June 1920. In mid-December 1919, the Army of Occupation was renamed as the Army of Asia Minor (Στρατιά Μικράς Ασίας) and placed under the command of Lt. General Konstantinos Miliotis-Komninos. It comprised the I Army Corps (K. Nider), with the 1st and 2nd Divisions, the Smyrna Army Corps (D. Ioannou) with the 13th and Archipelago Divisions, and the Smyrna Division as a reserve. Its total strength at the end of 1919 was 2,400 officers and 57,038 other ranks.

=== 1920 ===
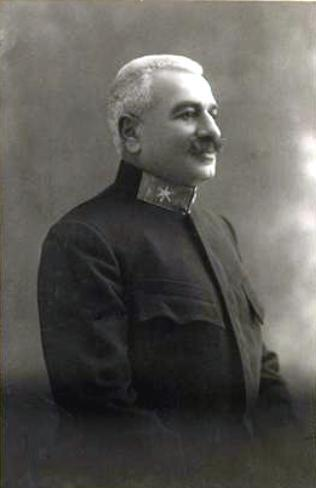
Lt. General Leonidas Paraskevopoulos

With continuing Turkish attacks on and across the "Milne Line", the Greek forces were re-inforced in February by the newly constituted Kydoniai Division. The Greek Army General Headquarters was also transferred from Thessaloniki to Smyrna, and on 15 February, Paraskevopoulos once again assumed direct control of operations, with the Army of Asia Minor effectively disbanded as a distinct command entity. Paraskevopoulos led the Greek Army in its summer offensive of June–August 1920, which advanced as far as Bursa in the north and Alaşehir and Uşak in the south.

Despite these successes, and the conclusion of the—greatly favourable to Greece—Treaty of Sèvres, in the November 1920 elections Prime Minister Eleftherios Venizelos lost power to the royalist United Opposition, followed soon after by the return of King Constantine I to the throne. These developments had immediate and severe repercussions for Greece's position: Constantine was detested by the Allies for his pro-German stance during World War I, and France and Italy began abandoning Greece for the Turkish nationalist leader Mustafa Kemal. The new regime also instituted widespread purges of Venizelist elements in the administration and the military. In Asia Minor, Paraskevopoulos was dismissed and replaced by Lt. General Anastasios Papoulas, at the head of the re-constituted Army of Asia Minor; by March 1921, the purges had removed the three Corps commanders, seven of nine divisional commanders, and a large portion of regimental commanders. Some 500 Venizelist officers resigned or were dismissed, and although the majority of mid- and lower-level commands was not affected, the purges deprived the army of some of its most experienced and dynamic officers and replaced them with a leadership that in the main had not seen action since the Balkan Wars of 1912–1913.

=== 1921 ===
In November 1920, the Army of Asia Minor comprised: I Army Corps, with the 1st, 2nd and 13th Divisions; II Army Corps, with the 3rd Infantry Division and Crete Divisions; the Smyrna Army Corps, with the Smyrna, Archipelago, Magnesia, and Kydoniai Divisions; and a cavalry brigade. The total strength was 3972 officers and 103,545 other ranks, with 297 artillery pieces, of which 36 heavy. The purges extended to the naming of units as well, so that names with "Venizelist" associations were dropped in favour of regular numbering: thus the Smyrna Army Corps became the III Corps, the Archipelago, Smyrna, Magnesia Divisions were renamed into the 7th, 10th, 11th Divisions respectively, and the Crete and Kydoniai Divisions were amalgamated into the 5th Division.

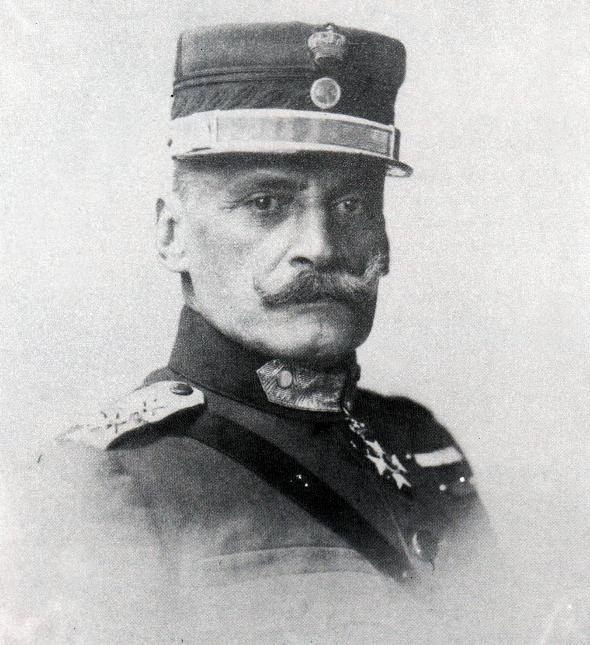
Lt. General Anastasios Papoulas

In late December (O.S.), Papoulas ordered the I and III Corps to engage in a limited offensive against their opposite Turkish forces, in order to probe their defences. The resulting First Battle of İnönü was hard-fought and highlighted the growing staying power of the Kemalist forces. The Greek leadership now faced the dilemma of the untenable position its army held in Anatolia: the Greek forces were deployed on a vast concave front, but the army was concentrated on the two extreme ends of the front, with a 160 km gap between the I Corps in the south and the III Corps around Bursa in the north. Despite voices—including Venizelos, who warned of Greece's increasing diplomatic isolation—that advocated a withdrawal to a more defensible line, the Greek Government resolved to resume the offensive. Further reserve classes were mobilized and calls for volunteers went out, hoping to raise an additional 60,000 men. However, before these reinforcements could be made available, on 10 March 1921, the Army of Asia Minor launched a general offensive. The Second Battle of İnönü ended in failure for the Greeks, who retreated to their original positions.

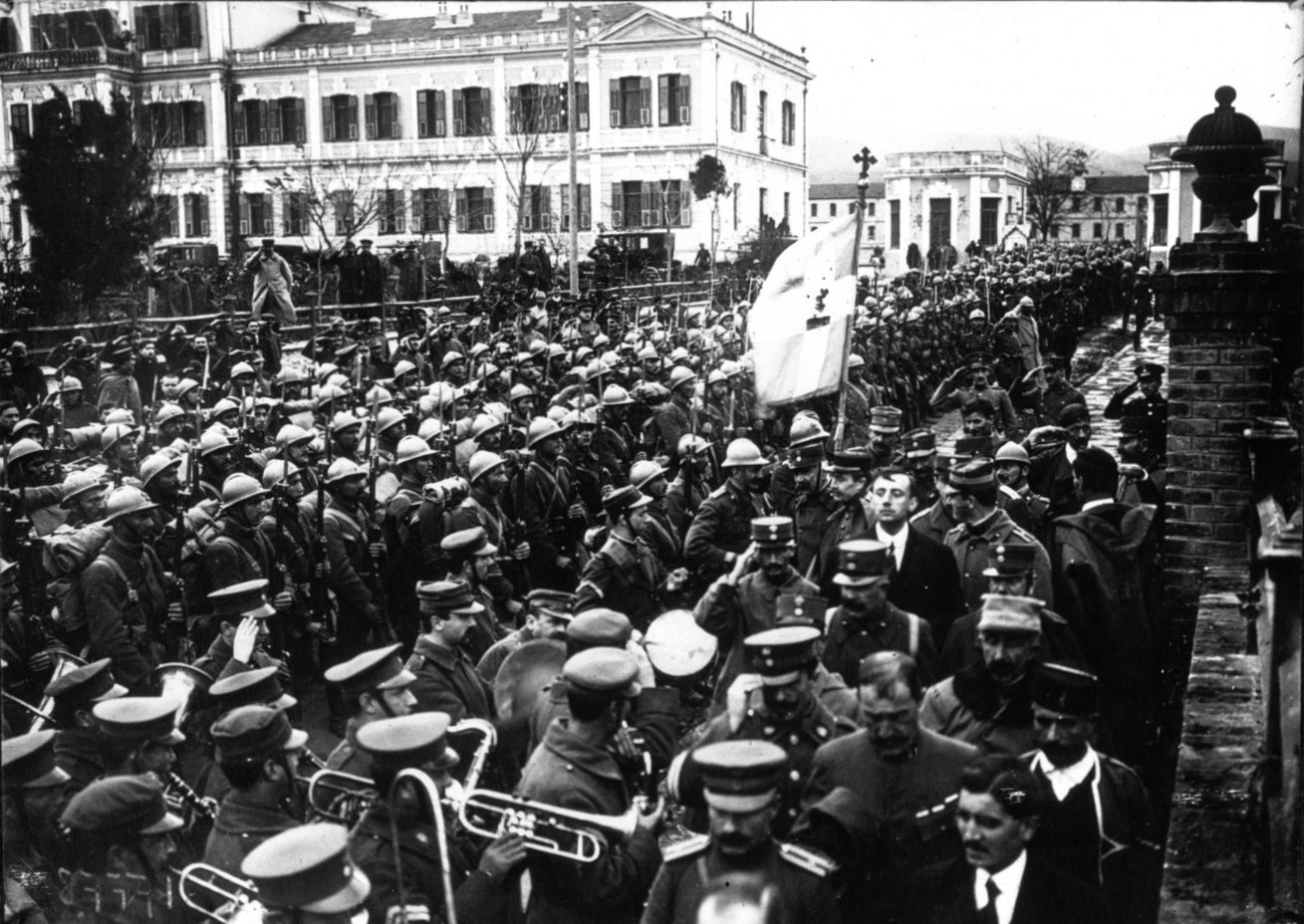
Greek troops leaving Athens for Asia Minor, March 1921

Following their retreat, the Greek High Command redoubled their efforts in preparation for the summer campaign: three divisions were transferred from the interior of Greece, raising the strength of the Army of Asia Minor to 11 infantry divisions and one cavalry brigade, totaling over 200,000 men with 300 artillery pieces and 700 machine guns. In preparation for the offensive, the Army was divided in two operational forces, northern and southern. The northern force comprised III Corps (G. Polymenakos) with the 7th and 10th Divisions and the northern group of divisions (N. Trikoupis), with the 3rd and most of the 11th Divisions. The southern force comprised the I Corps (A. Kontoulis) with the 1st and 2nd Divisions, II Corps (A. Vlachopoulos) with the 5th and 13th Divisions, and the southern group of divisions with the 4th and 12th Divisions, as well as an independent battle group formed from the bulk of the 9th Division. However, the need to protect the over-extended lines of supply and communication from attacks by Turkish irregulars, especially light cavalry which the Turks possessed in abundance, reduced the effective front-line strength of the Army to just 60,000 men.

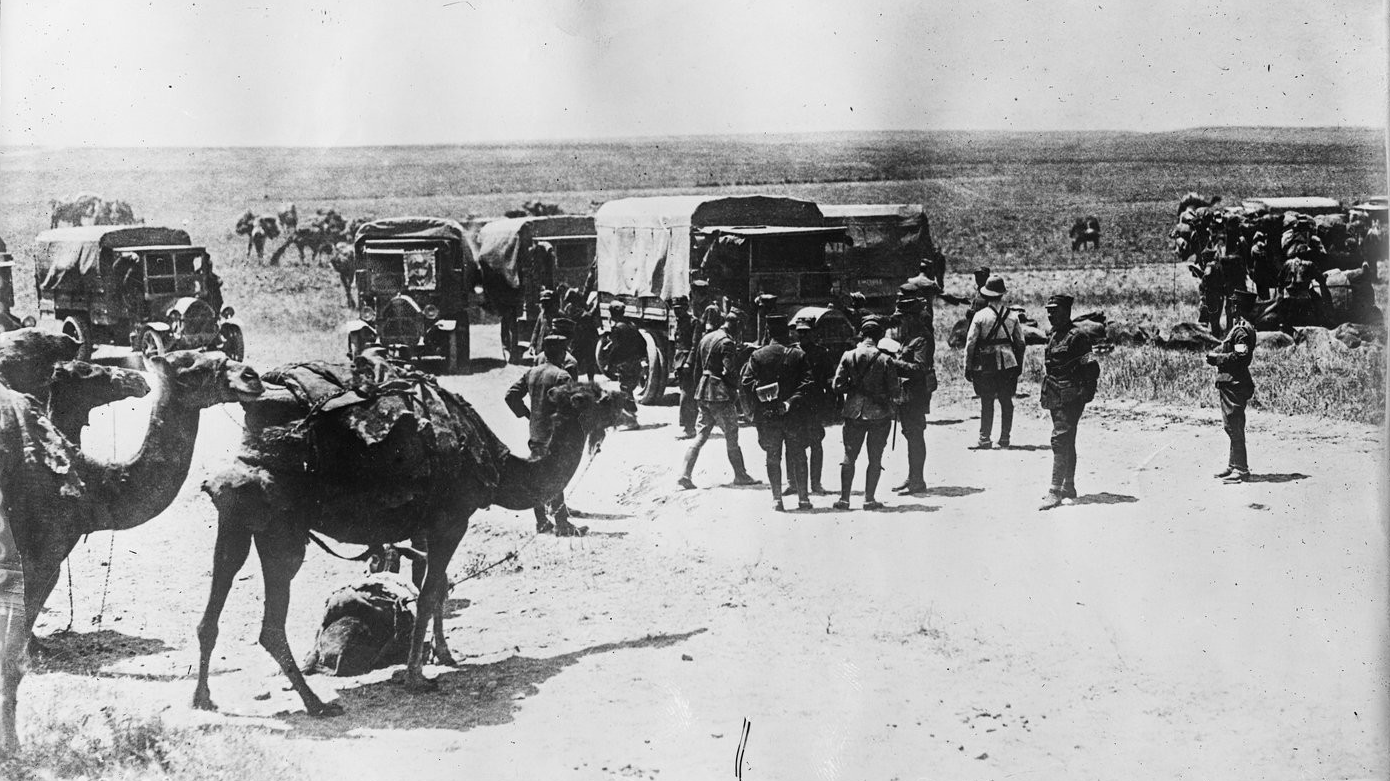
At the field headquarters of the Army of Asia Minor, August/September 1921

In the Battle of Afyonkarahisar–Eskişehir, the Greeks managed to defeat the Turkish resistance and occupied the two cities, but were not able to achieve their aim of cutting off their retreat. The Turkish forces managed to retreat and regroup beyond the Sakarya River. In the aftermath of the victory, the Army of Asia Minor's high command was divided as to the course to follow: in a staff council on 13 July, the deputy chief of staff, Col. Ptolemaios Sarigiannis, advocated an immediate advance to exploit the Turks' disorganization, while the head of the supply bureau, Col. G. Spyridonos, warned that the Greek army risked outrunning its supply lines. Despite their misgivings, Papoulas and the Army's chief of staff, Col. Konstantinos Pallis, sided with Sarigiannis, and the decision to resume the offensive was confirmed at a war council under the chairmanship of King Constantine three days later. Frantic efforts were made to repair railway lines and secure the supply routes through the territories conquered, while a few replacements of senior officers also took place, most notably Prince Andrew's assumption of command of the II Corps. At the start of operations, on 1 August 1921, the Army of Asia Minor comprised: I Corps (A. Kontoulis), with the 1st, 2nd and 12th Divisions; II Corps (Prince Andrew), with the 5th, 13th and 9th Divisions; III Corps (G. Polymenakos), with the 3rd, 7th and 10th Divisions, plus the cavalry brigade; and the southern group of divisions (N. Trikoupis), covering the southern flank of the Greek front with the 4th and 11th divisions. The Army's front-line force comprised ca. 80,000 troops.

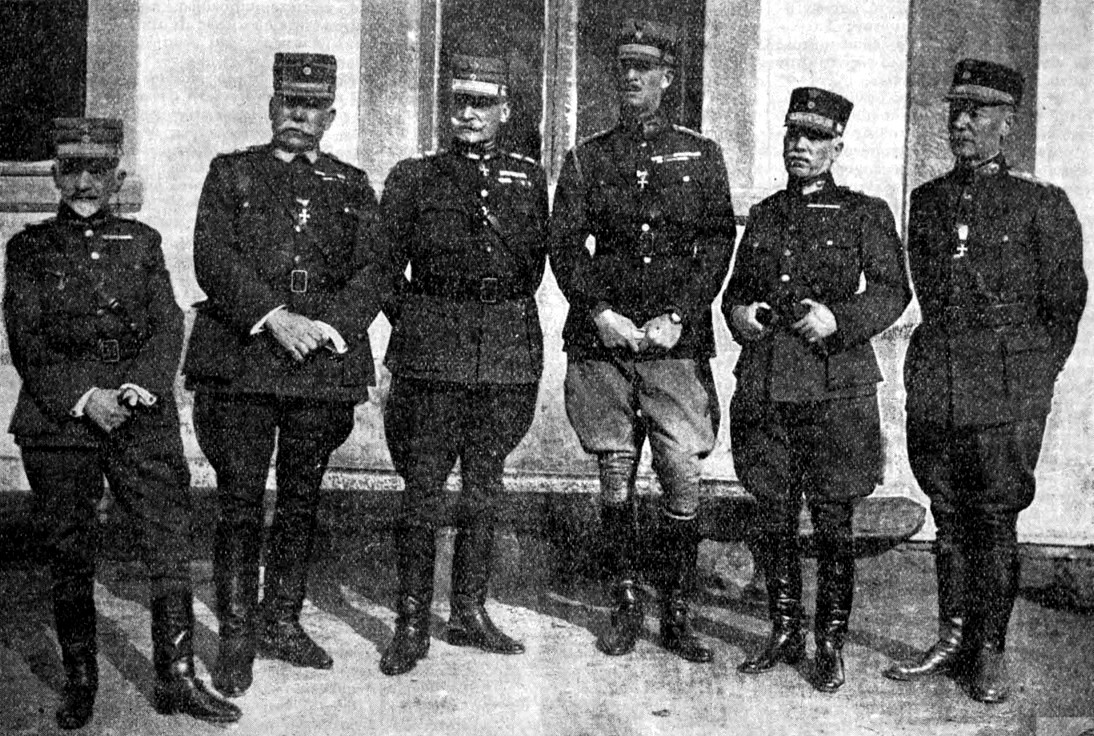
The Greek senior military leadership in September 1921

The Greek advance, which began on 1 August, was halted by the Turks, who had constructed a wide belt of fortifications in front of Ankara, in the bloody Battle of Sakarya (10–29 August). The Army of Asia Minor began its withdrawal to the line captured during the June–July operations, beating back Turkish attacks around Eskişehir and Afyonkarahisar. Having returned to its original positions, the Army of Asia Minor now began to entrench itself around Eskişehir in the north and Afyonkarahisar in the south, and created rear areas military commands to maintain its supply and communication lines. Morale was poor, and reports by Papoulas and other senior commanders warned of the need to end the conflict soon. The failure of the Greek August campaign had strengthened the position of the Turkish nationalist movement and worsened Greece's international position, as evidenced by the conclusion of treaties between France and Italy, still nominally Greece's allies, and the Ankara government. Although it became clear that Greece would, in all likelihood, be obliged to evacuate Anatolia, stalemate reigned on the Greek side, with quixotic attempts by some to salvage the situation by declaring the Greek-occupied parts of Anatolia to become an international protectorate as the "State of Asia Minor" (Μικρασιατικό Κράτος).

== Air force ==
The first Greek aircraft landed on Smyrna at the first day of the landing operations. On December 20, 1919, the "Aviation Service Directorate of the Asia Minor Army" (Greek: Διεύθυνσις Αεροπορικής Υπηρεσίας Στρατιάς) was founded, as a branch of the Army of Asia Minor. The Greek forces initially deployed four fighting squadrons: the 1st, 2nd Airplane Squadron, based in Kazamir and the 3rd Airplane Squadron based in Panormos. Additionally, the "Smyrna Naval Air Squadron" of the Hellenic Naval Air Service was also deployed in Asia Minor. Each squadron counted from 8 to 12 aircraft.

Air operations included reconnaissance, photography, bombing, as well as interception of enemy aircraft. In 1921 the Greek aircraft fleet covered a front that reached 700 km. Among the squadrons’ activities were the successful bombing missions by Airco DH.9s, against enemy targets in Kütahya and Eskişehir, in July 1921, during which an enemy fighter was also shut down.

In 1921–1922, additionally two aircraft squadrons were created and deployed in Asia Minor. In one of the last dogfights against enemy aircraft, seargent Christophoros Stavropoulos shot down a Turkish Breguet 17 northeast of Afyonkarahisar.

== Casualties ==
A total of 233,000 men were mobilized for the campaign in Asia Minor. According to official reports of the Greek Army, the casualties for the campaign as, 19,362 killed, 4,878 died outside of combat, 48,880 wounded, 18,095 missing and 10,000 prisoners. According to some Turkish estimates the casualties were at least 120,000-130,000. Historians Nicole and Hugh Pope estimate the total number of killed, wounded, prisoners and missing around 100,000. Material losses, during the war, were enormous too.

== Criticism and weaknesses ==
According to the official campaign history published by the Hellenic Army's History Directorate, the battlefield performance of the Army of Asia Minor, and its eventual strategic failure and retreat can be attributed to a number of factors. First of all, the Greek army during its advance had to confront the vastness of the operational space, which created enormous supply problems; the front was usually covered by relatively small forces, leaving large gaps between them for the Turkish cavalry, which with its five divisions was far more numerous than the Greek, to raid the long and exposed lines of supply and communications. In 1920 and 1921, the Greek army achieved several tactical successes on the battlefield, but the high command of the Army of Asia Minor was unable to convert them into a truly decisive, strategic success. According to the analysis of the History Directorate, to a large part this was due to the "extremely centralized" command and control system of the Army of Asia Minor: the high command closely directed operations down to divisional or even regimental level with detailed orders issued almost every day, even though these often were delayed on the way to the front lines due to the poor state of communications and the activity of the Turkish cavalry in the Greek rear. This system left little room for initiative by the commanders on the front, thus denying them the ability to exploit their tactical successes. Morale, which was relatively high until the summer of 1921, also rapidly collapsed thereafter, not only due to the hardships of the prolonged campaign and the bad supply situation, but also because a widespread impression of the war's futility gained ground; the deleterious effects of the National Schism on Greek society did the rest to undermine the war effort.

== See also ==
- Order of battle for the Battle of Sakarya
- Order of battle for the Battle of Dumlupınar

== Sources ==
- Ἐπίτομος ἱστορία τῆς εἰς Μικράν Ἀσίαν Ἐκστρατείας 1919-1922 [Concise History of the Campaign in Asia Minor 1914–1918] (in Greek). Athens: Hellenic Army History Directorate. 1967.
- Christopoulos, Georgios A. & Bastias, Ioannis K., eds. (1978). Ιστορία του Ελληνικού Έθνους, Τόμος ΙΕ΄: Νεώτερος Ελληνισμός από το 1913 έως το 1941 [History of the Greek Nation, Volume XV: Modern Hellenism from 1913 to 1941] (in Greek). Athens: Ekdotiki Athinon. ISBN 978-960-213-111-4.
- Πολεμική Ιστορία του Ελληνικού Έθνους: Περίοδος Παγκοσμίου Πολέμου - Εκστρατεία Μικράς Ασίας [Military History of the Greek Nation: Period of the World War - Asia Minor Campaign] (in Greek). Athens: Στρατιωτική Εγκυκλοπαίδεια. c. 1930.
