= Leonidas Paraskevopoulos =

Greek politician and general (1860–1936)

Leonidas Paraskevopoulos Λεωνίδας Παρασκευόπουλος
- Leonidas Paraskevopoulos; Λεωνίδας Παρασκευόπουλος
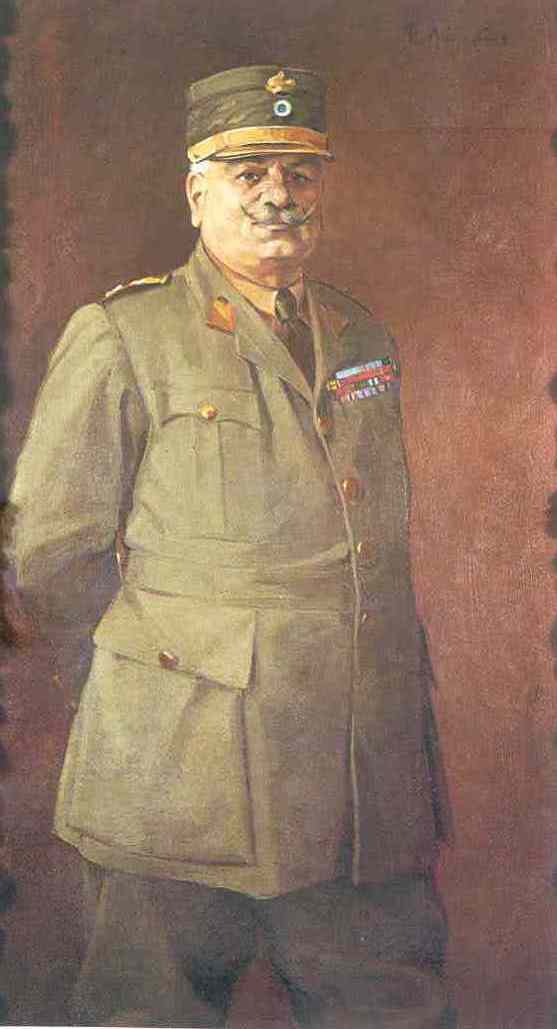
- Leonidas Paraskevopoulos c. 1920
- Born: 7 October 1860; Kythnos, Kingdom of Greece
- Died: 16 May 1936 (aged 75); Paris, French Third Republic
- Alma mater: Hellenic Army Academy
- Military career
- Allegiance: Kingdom of Greece
- Branch: Hellenic Army
- Service years: 1878–1920
- Rank: Lieutenant General
- Unit: Army of Thessaly
- Commands: 2nd Field Artillery Regiment; 2nd Infantry Division; Army of Epirus; 10th Infantry Division; I Army Corps; Army of Asia Minor
- Conflicts: Greco-Turkish War (1897); Cretan Revolt; Balkan Wars; First Balkan War; Battle of Sarantaporo; Battle of Bizani; Second Balkan War; Battle of Doiran; First World War; Macedonian front; Greco-Turkish War (1919–1922); Occupation of Smyrna; Greek Summer Offensive (1920)
- Awards: Grand Commander of the Order of the Redeemer; Medal of Military Merit; Order of the White Eagle
- Other work: President of the Greek Senate

Leonidas Paraskevopoulos (Greek: Λεωνίδας Παρασκευόπουλος; 7 October 1860 – 16 May 1936) was a Greek military officer and politician. He played a major role in Greece's war effort during the First World War, and was the commander-in-chief of the Army of Asia Minor during the Greco-Turkish War (1919–1922). In his later life, he was a member of the Greek Senate and served as its speaker in 1930–32.

== Life ==
Leonidas Paraskevopoulos was born on 7 October 1860 on the island of Kythnos. His family hailed from Smyrna, Asia Minor.

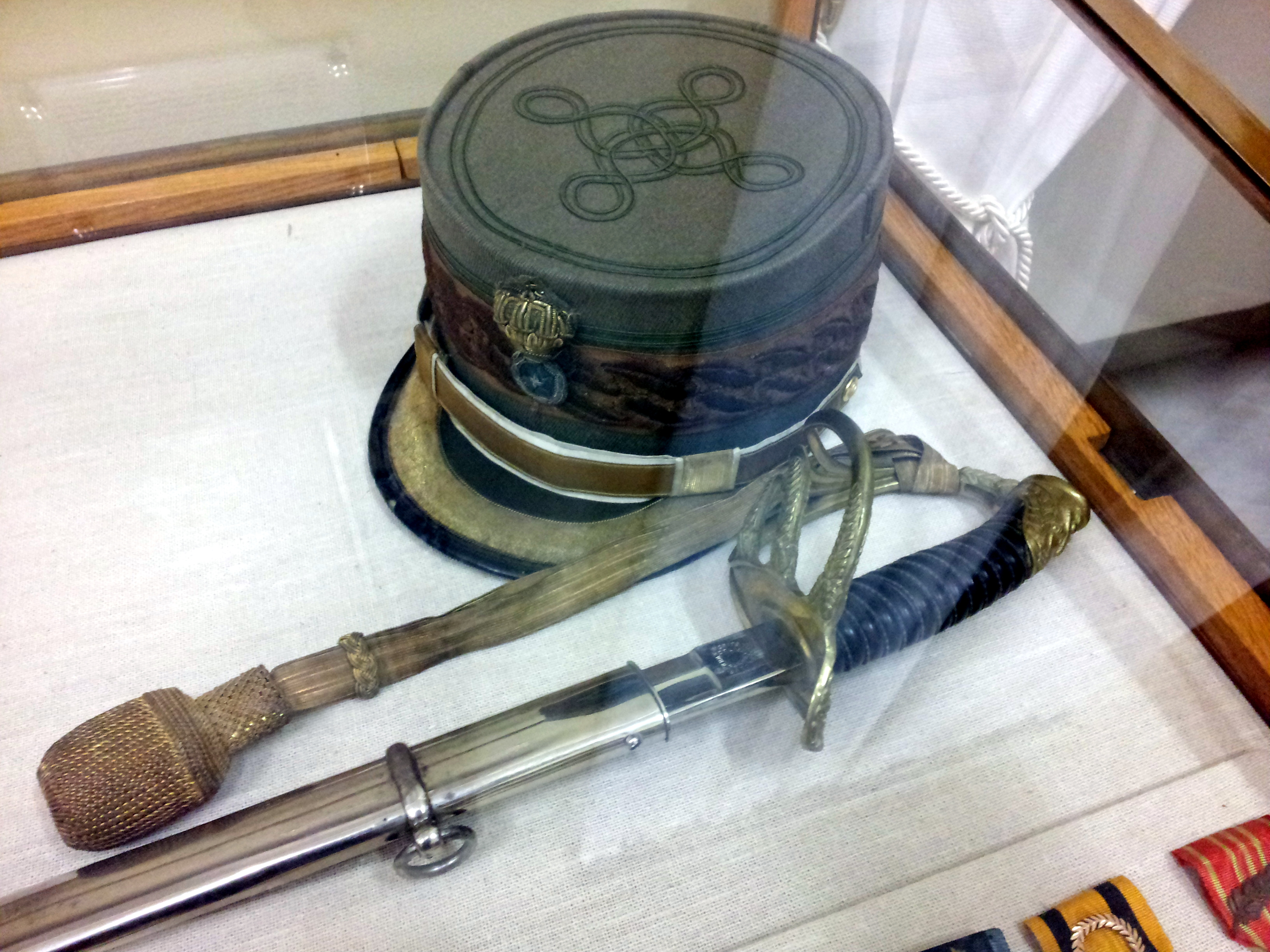
Kepi and sword of Paraskevopoulos, National Historical Museum, Athens.

He entered the Hellenic Military Academy and graduated in November 1881 as an Artillery 2nd Lieutenant. During the Greco-Turkish War of 1897, he served in the expeditionary corps sent to Crete under Colonel Timoleon Vassos. During the First Balkan War of 1912–13, he initially served as the commander of the 2nd Field Artillery Regiment, but already at the Battle of Sarantaporo he was appointed with the supervision of the entire artillery establishment of the Army of Thessaly, a post he held until the capture of Thessaloniki.

He then succeeded Konstantinos Kallaris as commander of the 2nd Infantry Division, when the latter was transferred to the Epirus front. There again, however, he was after a few days appointed as Chief of Artillery of the Army of Epirus, playing a crucial role in the successful Battle of Bizani and the capture of Ioannina. In April 1913 he was placed in command of the newly formed 10th Infantry Division, which he led during the Second Balkan War against Bulgaria, from the Battle of Doiran to the area of Pečkovo.

In World War I, Paraskevopoulos became commander of I Army Corps on the Strymon sector on the eastern flank of the Macedonian front in 1917–18, before being appointed commander-in-chief of the Greek Army in October 1918. After World War I, Paraskevopoulos took over direct command of the Greek forces that occupied Smyrna in 1919 in accordance with the Treaty of Sèvres. Under his command, the Hellenic Army successfully extended their occupation zone, from the greater Smyrna area, south to Aydın and north to Bursa.

With the electoral victory of the pro-monarchist United Opposition in November 1920, he was dismissed on 25 November 1920. After the end of the Greco-Turkish War (1919–1922), Paraskevopoulos entered politics. He was appointed to the Greek Senate in 1929 "on merit", and served as President of the Senate in 1930–32.

He died on 16 May 1936 in Paris, France, aged 75.

He was awarded Serbian Order of the White Eagle.

Military offices
Preceded by Lt. General Panagiotis Danglis	Commander-in-chief of the Greek Army; October 1918 – 12 November 1920	Succeeded by Lt. General Anastasios Papoulas as Commander-in-chief of the Army of Asia Minor
