= Anastasios Papoulas =

Greek general (1857–1935)

- Αναστάσιος Παπούλας
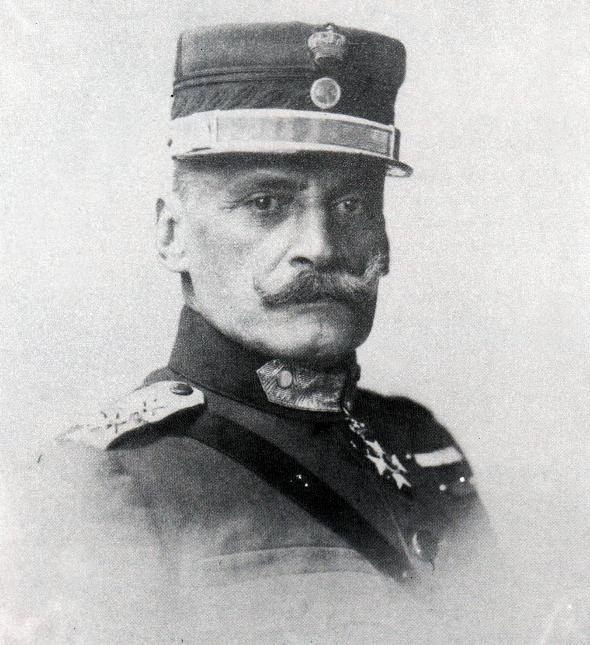
- Anastasios Papoulas c. 1920-22
- Born: 1/13 January 1857; Missolonghi, Kingdom of Greece
- Died: 24 April 1935 (aged 78); Athens, Kingdom of Greece
- Military career
- Allegiance: Kingdom of Greece
- Branch: Hellenic Army
- Service years: 1878–1920; 1920–1922
- Rank: Lieutenant General
- Commands: Army of Asia Minor; Athens Police
- Conflicts: Greco-Turkish War (1897); Macedonian Struggle; Balkan Wars; First Balkan War; Second Balkan War; Greco-Turkish War (1919–1922); First Battle of İnönü; Second Battle of İnönü; Battle of Aslıhanlar–Dumlupınar; Battle of Kütahya–Eskişehir; Battle of the Sakarya; 1935 Greek coup d'état attempt (executed)
- Awards: Commander's Cross of the Cross of Valour

Anastasios Papoulas (Greek: Αναστάσιος Παπούλας; 1/13 January 1857 – 24 April 1935) was a Greek general, most notable as the Greek commander-in-chief during most of the Greco-Turkish War of 1919–22. Originally a firm royalist, after 1922 he shifted towards the republican Venizelists, and was executed in 1935 for supporting a failed republican coup.

== Life ==
Born in Missolonghi on 1 January 1857, Anastasios Papoulas enlisted in the Greek Army in 1878. He fought in the Greco-Turkish War of 1897, and later served as head of police of Athens. During the Balkan Wars of 1912–13 he commanded the 10th Infantry Regiment.

After the end of the wars he was assigned to divisional and corps commands, but in 1917 he was dismissed from the Army due to his royalist sympathies during the National Schism. With the electoral victory of the pro-royalist United Opposition in November 1920, he was recalled to active service and appointed commander-in-chief of the Greek forces (the Army of Asia Minor) in Anatolia, replacing Lt. General Leonidas Paraskevopoulos. He commanded the Army of Asia Minor against the Turkish nationalists in the failed Greek offensives of spring 1921 (First Battle of İnönü, and Second Battle of İnönü), the Greek summer offensive of 1921 (Battle of Kütahya–Eskişehir and Battle of Sakarya) and the subsequent retreat to the lines captured in the Kütahya–Eskişehir battle.

On 19 May 1922, due to his disagreement with the government on the further prosecution of the war, he was dismissed and retired from active service.

Following the end of the war in 1922, Papoulas became a strong opponent of the monarchy after the establishment of the Second Hellenic Republic as a supporter of the Venizelos government during the late 1920s and the early 1930s. As one of the leaders of a pro-Venizelos coup attempt in March 1935, following the failure of the coup, he was captured and eventually executed for treason on 24 April 1935 in Athens.

Military offices
| Preceded by Lt. General Leonidas Paraskevopoulos as Commander-in-chief of the Greek Army | Commander-in-chief of the Army of Asia Minor; 12 November 1920 – 19 May 1922 | Succeeded by Lt. General Georgios Hatzianestis |
