= Second Battle of İnönü =

1921 battle of the Turkish War of Independence

- Part of the Greco-Turkish War (1919–22)
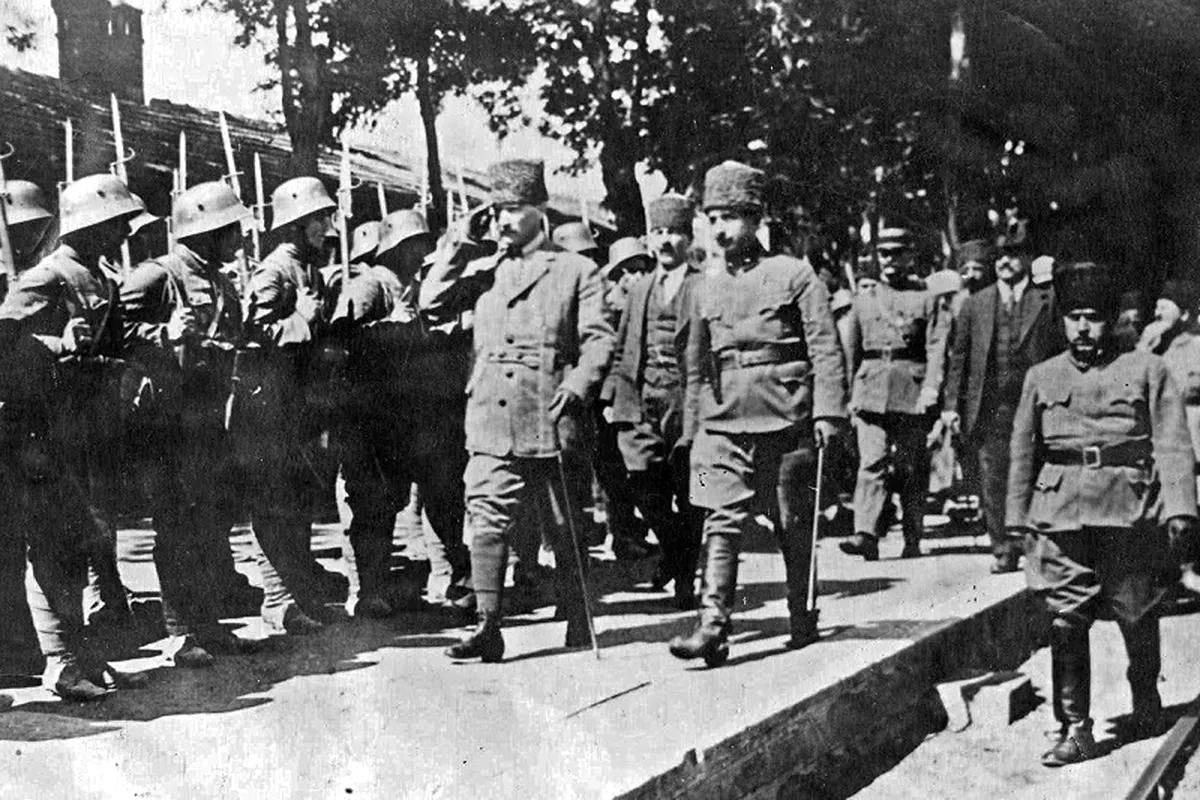
- Mustafa Kemal Pasha and İsmet İnönü after the battle
Date	March 23 – April 1, 1921
Location	Near İnönü, Turkey
Result	Turkish victory

Belligerents
Kingdom of Greece	Ankara Government

Commanders and leaders
Anastasios Papoulas; Ptolemaios Sarigiannis; Konstantinos Pallis; Nikolaos Trikoupis	İsmet Pasha

Strength
c. 16,600 troops	c. 25,500 troops (Note: Both Greek general Nikolaos Trikoupis and Turkish lieutenant colonel İbrahim Hakkı agreed that the Turkish forces who fought in the battle greatly outnumbered the Greek ones.)

Casualties and losses
707–755 killed 3,075 wounded 503 missing	681–1,499 killed 1,822–2,470 wounded 1,361 missing 6 prisoners 3 executed 1,080 deserters

The Second Battle of İnönü (Turkish: İkinci İnönü Muharebesi) was fought between March 23 and April 1, 1921 near İnönü in present-day Eskişehir Province, Turkey during the Greco-Turkish War (1919–22), also known as the western front of the larger Turkish War of Independence. It marked a turning point in the Greco-Turkish War and the Turkish War of Independence of which it was a part, as Greek forces had previously been victorious over mostly irregular Turkish forces and suffered their first major halt in Asia minor campaign.

== Background ==
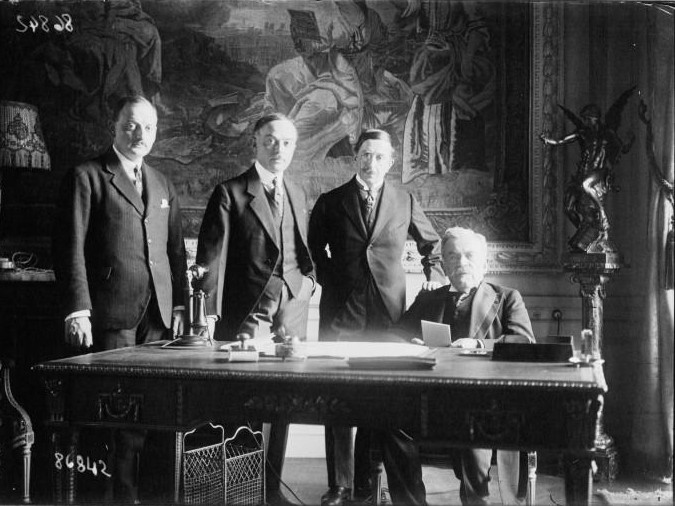
Sarigiannis (2nd from left) with PM Kalogeropoulos (seated) and other members of the Greek delegation in London, February 1921

After the First Battle of İnönü, where Miralay (Colonel) İsmet Bey fought against a Greek detachment out of occupied Bursa, the Greeks prepared for another attack aiming the towns of Eskisehir and Afyonkarahisar with their inter-connecting rail-lines. Ptolemaios Sarigiannis, staff officer in the Army of Asia Minor, made the offensive plan.

Before the battle, Greek Army had been heavily supplied by British with modernized weapons.

Meanwhile, the London Conference was held between February 21 and March 11, 1921. The Turkish side was not able to extract the concessions it demanded and thus the hostilities resumed again in March.

== Battle ==
The Greeks were determined to make up for the setback they suffered in January and prepared a much larger force than before. However, one estimate of the combat troops involved at İnönü gives the Turkish Western Front a numerical advantage over the Greek III Army Corps. (Note: Greek general Nikolaos Trikoupis stated that Turkish forces greatly outnumbered Greek troops at İnönü and quoted Turkish lieutenant colonel İbrahim Hakkı making a similar assessment. Neither gave exact numbers.)

The Greeks had grouped their forces in Bursa, Uşak, İzmit and Gebze. Against them, the Turks had grouped their forces at northwest of Eskişehir, east of Dumlupınar and Kocaeli.

Participating in this battle were Turkish Western and Southern Fronts, Kocaeli Group and Kastamonu Command. Greek forces were from their Army of Asia Minor, I and III Army Corps.

Sarigiannis was in the Conference of London when the Greek attack began, with General Konstantinos Pallis, Chief of Staff of the Army of Asia Minor, to have made some changes in the initial offensive plan.

The battle began with a Greek assault on the positions of İsmet's troops on March 23, 1921. It took them four days to reach İnönü due to delaying action of the Turkish front. The better-equipped Greeks pushed back the Turks and took the dominant hill called Metristepe on the 27th. A night counter-attack by the Turks failed to recapture it. Meanwhile, on March 24, Greek I Army Corps took Kara Hisâr-ı Sâhib (present-day Afyonkarahisar) after running over Dumlupınar positions. On 31 March İsmet attacked again after receiving reinforcements, and recaptured Metristepe. In a continuation battle in April, Refet Pasha retook the town of Kara Hisâr. The Greek III Army Corps retreated.

== Aftermath ==
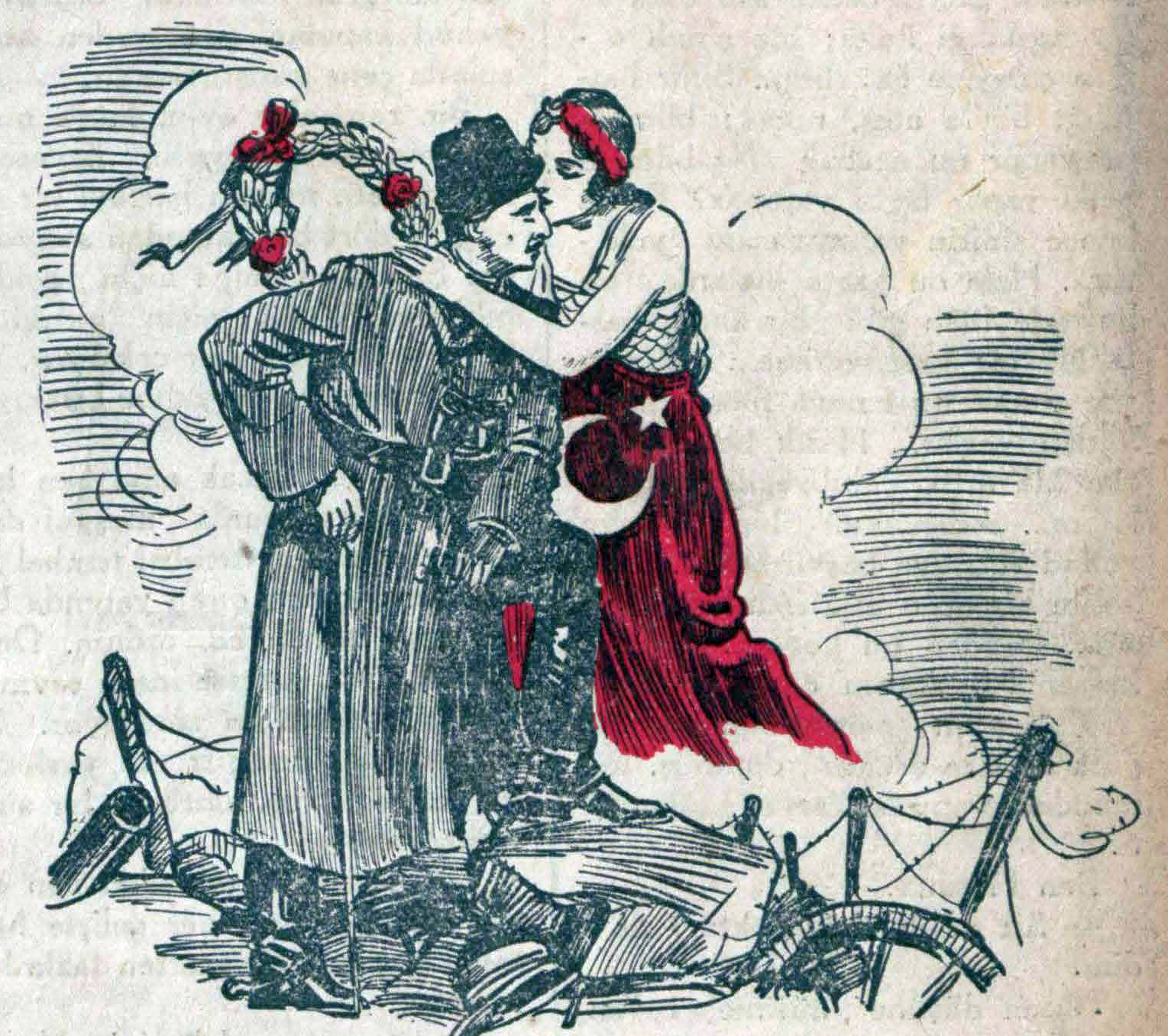
31 March 1935, the cartoon about the victory of the Second Battle of İnönü in the Turkish newspaper, Akşam.

After the victory, İsmet Pasha despatched a telegram to Mustafa Kemal Pasha from Metristepe which notifies joy of victory is as follows. From Metristepe, 1 April 1921:

Position observed at 6:30 p.m. from Metristepe. An enemy division, in all probability a rear - guard which since the morning has been in a position north of Gündüzbey is retreating in disorder as the result of an attack from our right. It is being closely followed up. In the direction of Hamidiye we are not in touch with the enemy and there is no fighting going on. Bozüyük is in flames. The enemy has abandoned the battlefield to us, leaving thousands of dead behind.

— Western Front commander İsmet

While the battle marked a turning point in the war, following the battles of İnönü there was a stalemate, as the Turks had missed their chance to encircle and destroy the Greek army, which retreated in good order. There were casualties on both sides, and neither side was in a position or state of mind to make more advances.

Most significantly, this was the first time the newly formed Turkish standing army faced their enemy and proved themselves to be a serious and well led force, not just a collection of rebels. This was a very much needed success for Mustafa Kemal Pasha, as his opponents in Ankara were questioning his delay and failure in countering the rapid Greek advances in Anatolia. This battle forced the Allied capitals to take note of the Ankara Government and eventually within the same month they ended up sending their representatives there for talks. France and Italy changed their positions and became supportive of Ankara government in short order.

The Greeks were determined to defeat the Turkish nationalists and end their resistance, successfully repelling the immediate Turkish offensive at the Battle of Aslıhanlar–Dumlupınar and, then, preparing for an even bigger showdown at the battles of Kütahya–Eskişehir and Sakarya.
