= Battle of Kütahya–Eskişehir =

1921 battle of the Turkish War of Independence

- Part of the Greco-Turkish War (1919–1922)
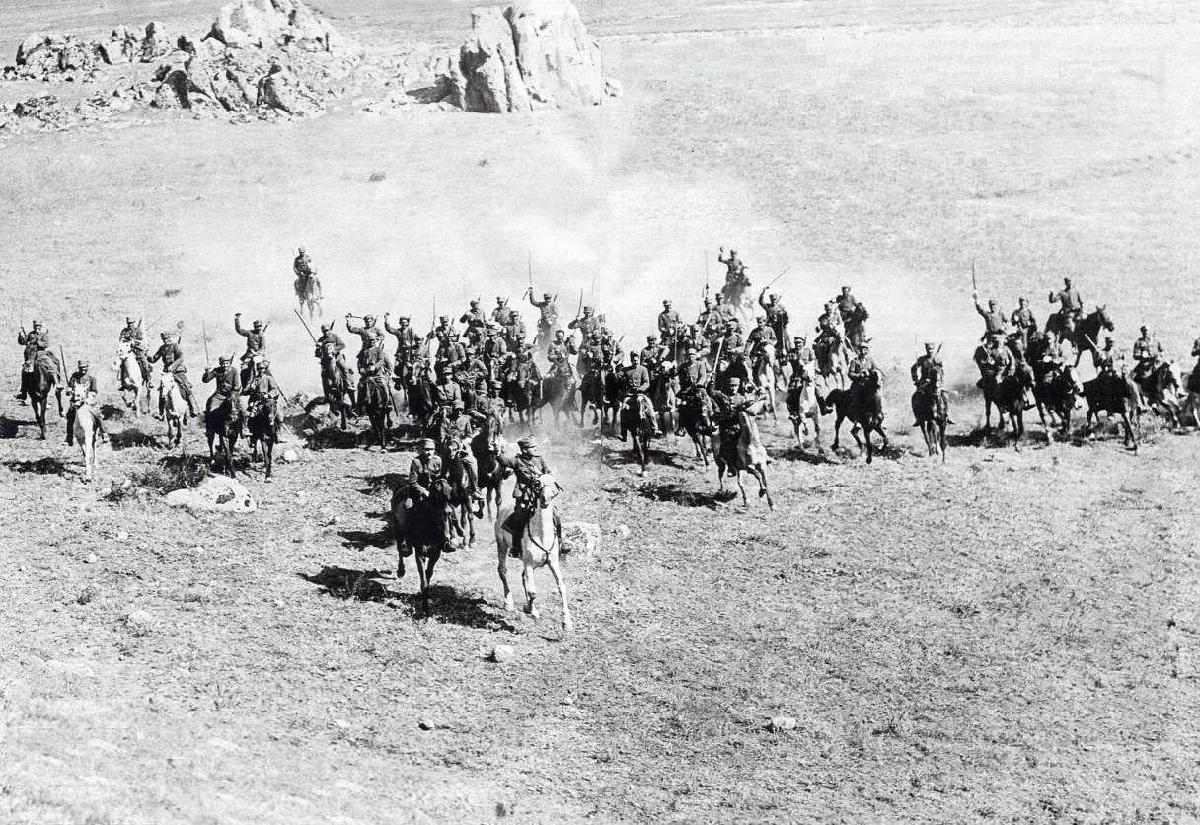
- Greek cavalry charge.
| Date | 10–24 July 1921 |
| Location | Afyonkarahisar–Kütahya–Eskişehir, Anatolia |
| Result | Greek victory: Greek capture of Afyonkarahisar, Kütahya and Eskişehir; Turkish army retreats east of the Sakarya River |

Belligerents
| (Ottoman Empire) Ankara Government | (Kingdom of Greece) Greece |

Commanders and leaders
| Mustafa Kemal Pasha; İsmet Pasha; Mehmet Nâzım Bey † | Constantine I of Greece; Anastasios Papoulas |

Strength
| 122,229 personnel 60,103 rifles 670 machine guns 162 artillery pieces 4 aircraft | 136,142 personnel 66,300 rifles 852 machine guns 460 artillery pieces 20 aircraft |

Casualties and losses
| 8,500 killed and wounded 6,000 prisoners Total: 14,500 casualties 4,000 rifles, 50 machine guns and 30 artillery pieces captured | 1,185 killed 5,180 wounded Total: 6,365 casualties |

The Battle of Kütahya–Eskişehir (Greek: Μάχες Κιουτάχειας-Δορυλαίου, Turkish: Kütahya-Eskişehir Muharebeleri) was a major battle of the Greco-Turkish War, fought between 10 and 24 July 1921.

The Army of Asia Minor, commanded by General Anastasios Papoulas, launched an offensive against the Turkish nationalist forces under Mustafa Kemal Pasha and İsmet Pasha, defending the Afyonkarahisar–Kütahya–Eskişehir line. The battle ended in a Greek victory, with the Greek Army capturing all three cities, securing important railway connections, defeating a Turkish counteroffensive and compelling the Turkish forces to retreat east of the Sakarya River.

It was the first Greek offensive following the Allied Powers' declaration of neutrality in the conflict on 13 May 1921. As such, the victory was enthusiastically celebrated in Greece and was portrayed in epic and heroic terms.

The victory was one of the most important Greek military successes of the campaign. The Turkish army suffered considerable losses and relinquished important positions and railway centres, while the Greek Army established control over a large part of western Anatolia. However, the Turkish main army escaped encirclement and withdrew to reorganise its forces east of the Sakarya. Consequently, although the Greek offensive achieved its principal territorial objectives, it did not bring the war to an end.

== Background ==
After the Second Battle of İnönü in March 1921, the Greek high command began preparing a renewed offensive against the Turkish nationalist army. Although the Greek Army had failed to achieve its principal objectives at İnönü, its following success at the Battle of Aslıhanlar–Dumlupınar demonstrated that it remained capable of conducting successful offensive operations. The Greek government sought a major victory that would defeat the Turkish resistance and strengthen Greece's position in any eventual peace settlement.

The diplomatic situation had become increasingly difficult for Greece. The electoral defeat of Eleftherios Venizelos in the November 1920 Greek elections and the return of King Constantine I had damaged relations with the Allied Powers, particularly France and Italy. The Allies began withdrawing their previous support, and restrictions were imposed on the export of certain military supplies. On 13 May 1921, the Allied Powers formally declared their neutrality in the Greco-Turkish conflict. Britain, nevertheless, under David Lloyd George, continued to maintain a more sympathetic political attitude towards Greece than France and Italy, which explicitly took a hostile stance.

The Greek Army therefore prepared its summer offensive without direct Allied participation in the fighting. Its objective was to break the Turkish defensive line, capture the strategically important railway junctions of Afyonkarahisar, Kütahya and Eskişehir, and, if possible, surround and destroy the principal Turkish forces in western Anatolia.

The Greek forces were reinforced in preparation for the operation. King Constantine travelled to Anatolia to encourage the troops and assume a symbolic role in the campaign, while operational command remained with General Papoulas. The Greek plan involved a coordinated advance by several army corps, intended to turn the Turkish flanks and prevent the defenders from retreating towards Ankara.

== Battle ==
=== Greek offensive ===
The Greek offensive began on 10 July 1921 (27 June in the Old Style calendar then used in Greece). Greek formations advanced from their positions in western Anatolia towards the fortified Turkish defensive line. The operations were conducted across a broad front, with the Greek army corps advancing towards Afyonkarahisar, Kütahya and Eskişehir.

The Greek forces made considerable progress during the opening stages. On 13 July, the Greek IV Division captured Afyonkarahisar. Further Greek attacks broke through fortified Turkish positions around Karabuyuk Dağı and Ruklu Dağı on 14 July. The I and II Army Corps afterwards advanced against Turkish positions southwest of Kütahya, capturing the Çavuş Çiftlik area and Hill 1799 on 16 July.

The fighting around Kütahya was particularly intense. Greek formations attacked the Turkish positions from several directions, while the defenders attempted to resist the advance and maintain their communications with Eskişehir. The coordinated operations of the Greek I, II and III Army Corps placed the Turkish forces under increasing pressure and threatened their flanks. On 17 July, the Greek Army captured Kütahya, compelling the Turkish defenders to withdraw towards the northeast.

The fall of Kütahya was a major success for the Greek offensive. The city occupied an important position in the Turkish defensive system, and its loss threatened the communications of the forces defending Eskişehir. The Greek Army continued its advance and pursuit, and on 19 July, elements of the III Army Corps entered Eskişehir, which the Turkish forces had evacuated.

=== Turkish counter-offensive ===
On 21 July, Mustafa Kemal Pasha personally intervened the same day, issuing direct orders for an attack against the advancing Greek forces at Kırgız Dağı, whose penetration he considered a serious threat to the entire Turkish army. As such, the Turkish nationalist forces launched a major counteroffensive against the Greek positions east of Dorylaeum. The attack was intended to disrupt the Greek formations and reverse the results of the preceding offensive.

The Turkish attack began in the early morning and developed into a general engagement along the front of the Greek III Army Corps. Greek formations, including the VII and X Divisions, came under heavy artillery and infantry fire. Despite the intensity of the Turkish assaults, the Greek defenders maintained their positions and subsequently launched counterattacks of their own.

The Greek counterattacks succeeded in driving back the Turkish forces and capturing important positions around Muttalip, Boz Dağı and Yörük Karacaören. Greek troops pursued the retreating defenders for several kilometres east of Eskişehir. The Turkish counteroffensive was repulsed, confirming Greek control of the city and the surrounding positions.

The Hellenic Army General Staff describes the battle in Dorylaeum as the largest engagement of the Asia Minor Campaign up to that point. The Greek military leadership celebrated the result as an important victory, praising the conduct of the officers and soldiers involved and its significance for the army's achievements.

=== Turkish withdrawal ===
Following their defeat, the Turkish nationalist forces withdrew towards the Sakarya River. They had lost important cities and suffered substantial casualties and desertions, but they, at least, preserved the principal formations of their army and avoided the encirclement sought by the Greek high command.

The retreat was supported by the Turkish leadership, which concluded that continuing to defend the existing positions would expose the army to further losses. The Turkish forces withdrew east of the Sakarya by 25 July, where they began preparing a new defensive position.

The Greek victory nevertheless produced significant military and territorial gains. The capture of Afyonkarahisar, Kütahya and Eskişehir gave the Greek Army control over strategically important railway junctions and strengthened its communications and supply arrangements in the Anatolian interior. The Turkish withdrawal also removed the immediate threat posed by the nationalist forces to the Greek positions in this sector.

== Aftermath ==
=== Military significance ===
The Battle of Kütahya–Eskişehir was an important Greek victory and demonstrated the ability of the Army of Asia Minor to conduct a large-scale offensive against the Turkish nationalist army. The Greek forces had overcome fortified positions, captured three important cities and defeated a major Turkish counterattack. The result represented a considerable improvement in the Greek military position in western Anatolia.

The outcome also had serious consequences for the Ankara government. The loss of important cities and the Turkish withdrawal towards the Sakarya caused considerable concern among the nationalist leadership. The possibility of relocating the government from Ankara to Kayseri was discussed, while the Turkish army undertook preparations for a renewed defence. The severe defeat also triggered a political crisis in Ankara, as an increasingly powerful opposition in the Grand National Assembly of Turkey held Mustafa Kemal personally responsible for the military disaster and sought to undermine his authority.

The Greek success was nevertheless incomplete in that the Turkish main army had not been destroyed. The withdrawal east of the Sakarya enabled the nationalist forces to retain their capacity to continue the war and establish new defensive positions. The battle therefore produced substantial territorial and military advantages for Greece without securing the decisive outcome that the Greek government had sought.

=== Greek reactions ===
The victory was greeted with considerable enthusiasm in Greece, where newspapers celebrated the achievements of the army and portrayed the offensive as an important event in modern Greek military history.

The newspaper Skrip, reporting on the capture of Kütahya, described the fighting as a great Greek epic and compared the city's capture to the Greek victory at the Battle of Bizani during the First Balkan War. The newspaper presented the battle as a historic achievement that would occupy a prominent place in the memory of later generations.

The newspaper Embros used the headline "The Immortal Epic of Kütahya" (Greek: Η Αθάνατος Εποποιΐα της Κιουτάχειας) and praised the "mythic heroism" of the officers and soldiers who participated in the fighting. The newspaper Makedonia described the wider campaign as the "Epic of Asia Minor".

=== Turkish reactions ===
The defeat caused considerable disappointment and anxiety among the Turkish population, as the loss of three strategically important cities and the army's withdrawal towards the Sakarya River severely damaged public morale. The Turkish nationalist press attempted to minimise the significance of the defeat, falsely portraying the retreat as a deliberate military manoeuvre rather than a defeat.

On 20 July, the newspaper Açıksöz published headlines declaring "The Enemy Has Been Stopped" (Turkish: Düşman Tevkif Edildi) and "The Enemy Has Begun to Flee" (Turkish: Düşman Kaçmaya Başladı), while the Greek Army was, in reality, getting closer and closer to the outskirts of Ankara.

The defeat also provoked a serious political crisis within the Grand National Assembly of Turkey. Opposition deputies openly blamed Mustafa Kemal, Fevzi Pasha and İsmet Pasha for the military disaster, demanding that those responsible be identified and punished. Some specifically sought to undermine Kemal's authority by holding him personally responsible for the defeat. The Greek advance also prompted discussions on 23 July about evacuating Ankara and relocating the government to Kayseri, although the proposal encountered considerable resistance.

=== Decision to advance towards Ankara ===
Following the victory, the Greek political and military leadership met at Kütahya to consider the future direction of the campaign. The meeting was attended by King Constantine, Prime Minister Dimitrios Gounaris, War Minister Nikolaos Theotokis, General Papoulas and senior members of the general staff.

The principal question was whether the Greek Army should consolidate its newly acquired positions or undertake another offensive against the Turkish nationalist forces, which were reorganising east of the Sakarya River. The capture of the railway centres had improved the Greek position, but the continued existence of the Turkish field army meant that the wider military and political objectives of the campaign remained unresolved.

The Greek leadership ultimately decided to continue operations towards Ankara in an attempt to defeat the Turkish army decisively. This decision led to a further Greek advance and the Battle of Sakarya in August–September 1921.

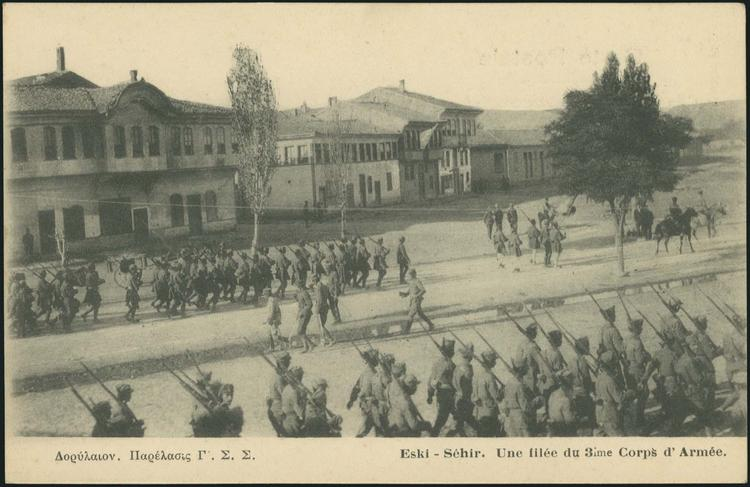
Greek army in Eskişehir

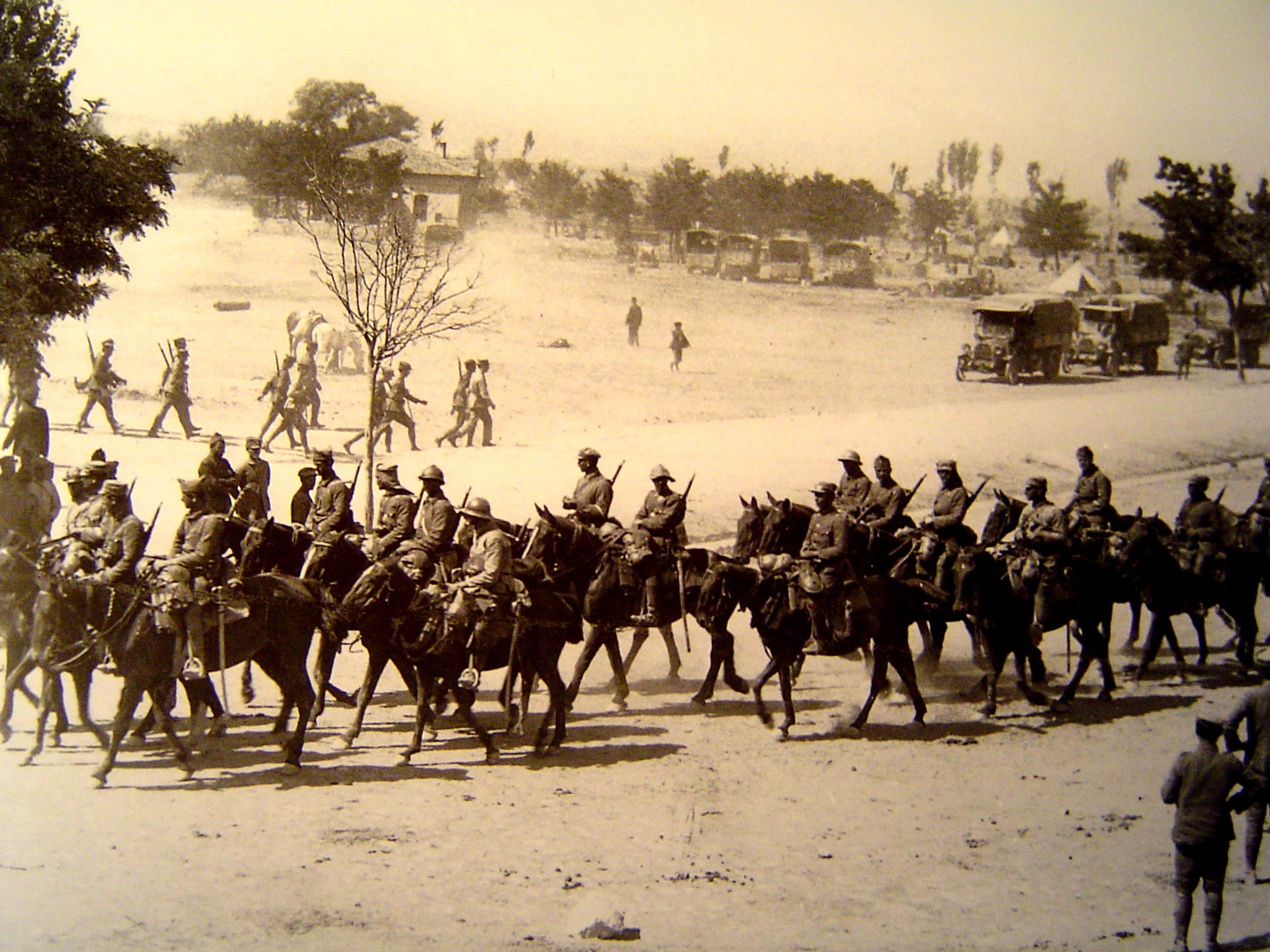
Greek cavalry in Eskişehir
