= Battle of the Sakarya =

Major battle of the Turkish War of Independence

- Part of the Greco-Turkish War (1919–1922)
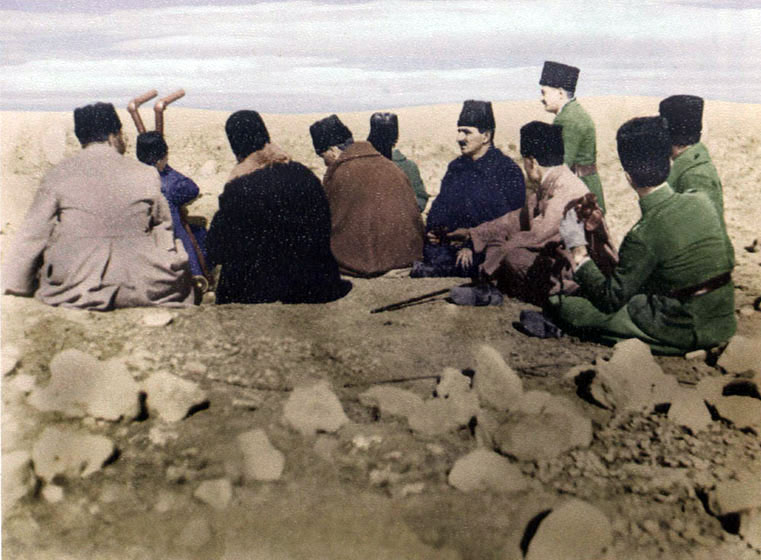
- At Duatepe observation hill (in Polatlı): Fevzi Çakmak, Kâzım Özalp, Mustafa Kemal Atatürk, İsmet İnönü and Hayrullah Fişek
Date	August 23 – September 13, 1921
Location	On the banks of Sakarya River, Turkey
Result	Military stalemate: Greek advance failed

Belligerents
(Kingdom of Greece) Greece	(Ottoman Empire) Ankara Government

Commanders and leaders
Anastasios Papoulas; Prince Andrew	Mustafa Kemal Pasha; Fevzi Pasha; İsmet Pasha

Units involved
Order of battle	Order of battle

Strength
c. 77,000 soldiers 3,780 officers 57,000 rifles 2,768 machine guns 386 cannons 1,350 swords 600 3-ton trucks 240 1-ton trucks 18 airplanes	101,727 soldiers 5,401 officers 54,572 rifles 825 machine guns 196 cannons 1,309 swords 2 aircraft

Casualties and losses
3,958 dead Total: 23,267 casualties	5,713 dead Total: 37,900 casualties

The Battle of the Sakarya (Turkish: Sakarya Meydan Muharebesi, lit. 'Sakarya Field Battle'), also known as the Battle of the Sangarios (Greek: Μάχη του Σαγγαρίου, romanized: Máchi tou Sangaríou), was the decisive engagement in the Greco-Turkish War (1919–1922), halting Greek advance towards Ankara and creating the circumstances for an upcoming Turkish counter offensive.

The battle went on for 21 days from August 23 to September 13, 1921, close to the banks of the Sakarya River in the immediate vicinity of Polatlı, which is today a district of the Ankara Province. The battle line stretched over 62 miles (100 km).

== Background ==
The Greeks, on July 16, 1921, skillfully executed a feint towards the Turkish right flank at Eskişehir distracted Ismet Pasha, just as the major assault fell on the left flank at Kara Hisar. The Greeks then wheeled their axis to the north, swept towards Eskişehir and rolled up the Turkish defence in a series of frontal assaults that was combined with flanking movements.

Eskişehir fell on July 17 despite a vigorous counterattack by Ismet Pasha, who was determined not to surrender any more ground. However, saner counsels of Mustafa Kemal Ataturk prevailed, and Ismet Pasha disengaged with great losses to reach the defensive position on the banks of the Sakarya River, some 30 mi (48 km) to the north and only 50 miles (80 km) from Ankara.

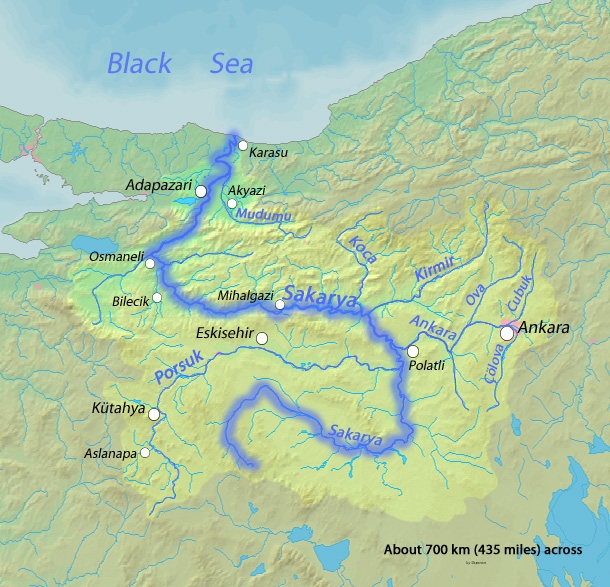
The battle took place along the Sakarya River, around the vicinity of Polatlı, and had a battle line 100 km (62 mi) long.

The determining feature of the terrain was the river itself, which flows eastward across the plateau, suddenly curves north and then turns back westwards. The great loop described forms a natural barrier. The river banks are rugged and steep, and bridges were few with only two on the frontal section of the loop. East of the loop, the landscape rises before any westward invader in rocky, barren ridges and hills towards Ankara. Turkish high command set their defensive positions on the east bank of the river. The front followed the hills east of the Sakarya River from a point near Polatlı southwards to the place at which the Gök River joins the Sakarya, and then swung at right angles eastwards, following the line of the Gök River. The region was excellent defensive ground.

For the Greeks, the question was one of whether to dig in and rest on their previous gains, or to advance towards Ankara in great effort and destroy the Army of the Grand National Assembly. Either option was difficult to resolve and posed the eternal problems with which the Greek staff had to deal since the beginning of the war. The dangers of extending their lines of communications still further in an inhospitable terrain that killed horses, caused vehicles to break down and prevented the movement of heavy artillery, were obvious. The present front gave the Greeks control of the essential strategic railway and was tactically most favourable, but the Army of the Grand National Assembly had escaped encirclement at Kütahya, without a decisive military engagement. For the Greek command, a decisive blow against the enemy military on low military supplies was an opportunity that could not have been passed, since it could mean the total disintegration of the Turkish army and the fall of the newly found government in Ankara. Knowing the danger of a military failure, Turkish high command had already made plans to possibly retreat and make Kayseri (Caesarea) the new seat of the government, a few hundred kilometers to the east of Ankara.

== Battle ==
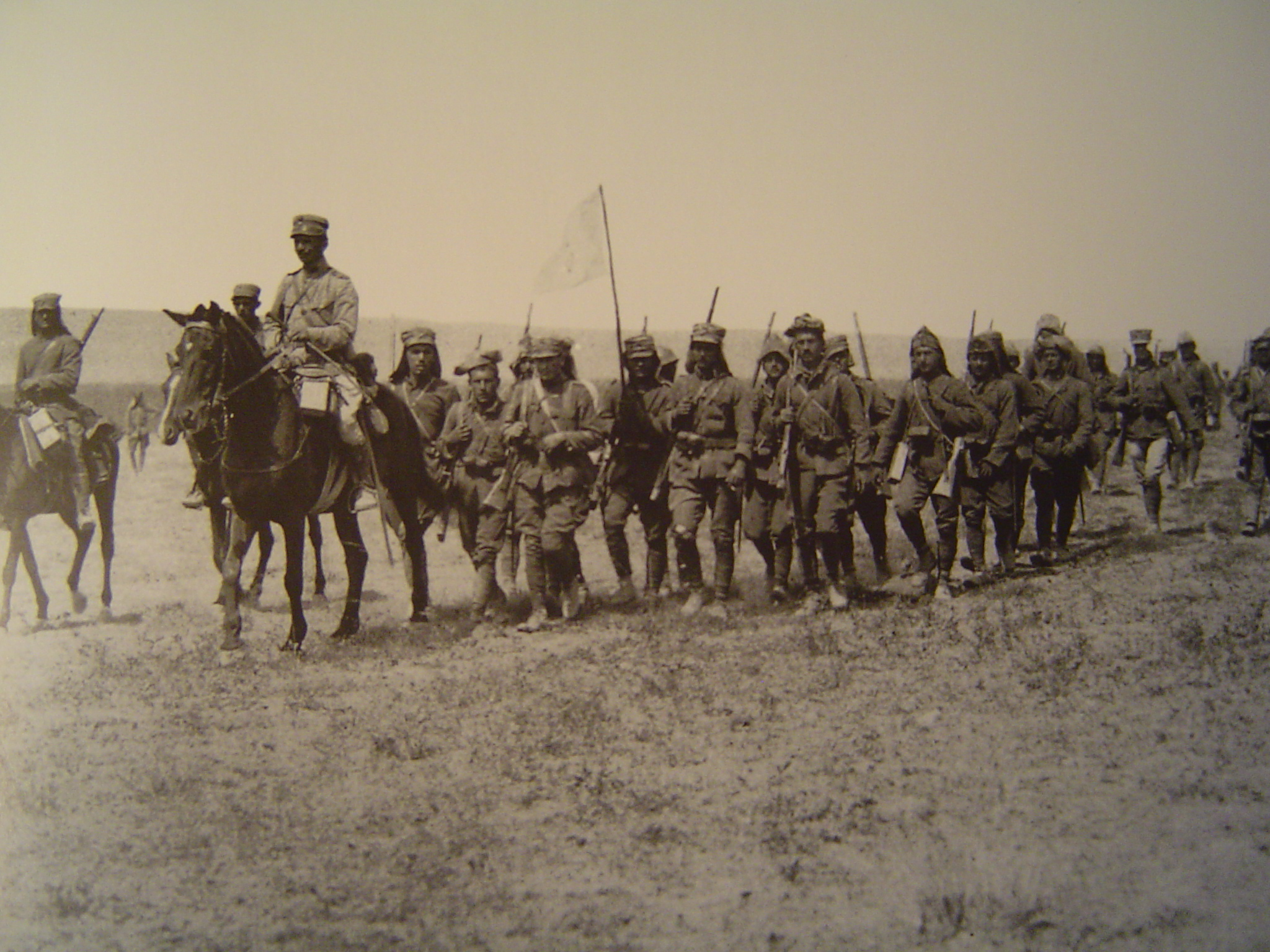
The Greek 9th infantry division marches through the steppe.

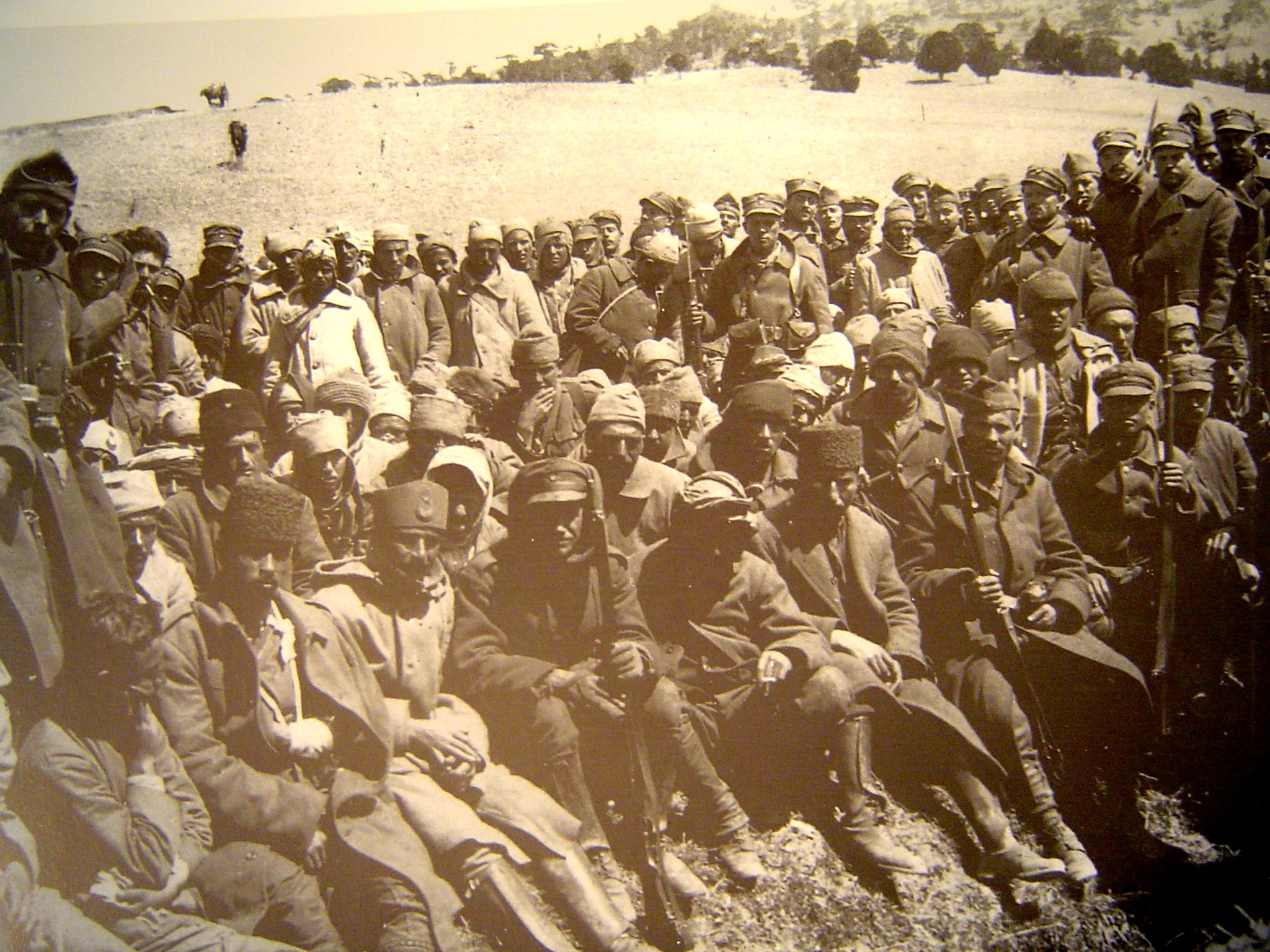
Turkish prisoners-of-war were captured during the battle.

On August 10, Greek King Constantine I finally committed his forces to an assault against the Sakarya Line. The Greeks marched hard for nine days before they made contact with the enemy. The march included an outflanking maneuver via the northern part of Anatolia, where food and water were scarce; therefore, the advancing Greek infantry forcefully resupplied from Turkish villages for maize and water.

On August 23, battle was finally joined by the Greeks making contact with the advanced Turkish positions south of the Gök River. The Turkish General Staff had made its battle headquarters at Polatlı, on the railway a few miles east of the coast of the Sakarya River.

On August 26, the Greeks attacked all along the line. Crossing the shallow Gök, the infantry fought its way step up onto the heights, where every ridge and hill top had to be stormed against strong entrenchments and withering fire.

By September 2, the commanding heights of the key Mount Chal were in Greek hands, but once the enveloping movement against the Turkish left flank had failed, the battle descended to a typical head-on confrontation of infantry, machine guns and artillery. The Greeks launched their main effort in the centre and pushed forward some 10 mi (16 km) in 10 days through the Turks' second line of defence. Some Greek units came as close as 31 mi (50 km) to the city of Ankara. For the Greeks, this was the peak of their achievement in the Asia Minor Campaign.

For days during the battle, neither ammunition nor food had reached the front because of successful harassment of the Greek lines of communications and raids behind the Greek lines by Turkish cavalry. All of the Greek troops were committed to the battle, but fresh Turkish draftees were still arriving throughout the campaign in response to the Turkish National Movement's mobilisation. All of those causes ended the impetus of the Greek attack. For a few days, there was a lull in the fighting during which neither of the exhausted armies could press an attack.

Ataturk assumed personal command of the Turkish forces and led a small counterattack against the Greek left, around Mount Chal, on September 8. The Greek line held, and the attack itself achieved a limited military success, but the fear that presaged a major Turkish effort to outflank their forces, while the severity of the winter was approaching, the Greeks break off the assault on September 14, 1921.

That made Anastasios Papoulas order a general retreat toward Eskişehir and Afyonkarahisar. The Greek troops evacuated Mount Chal, which had been taken at such a cost, and they retired unmolested across the Sakarya River to the positions that they had left a month earlier and took their guns and equipment with them. In the line of the retreating army, nothing was left that could benefit the Turks. Railways and bridges were blown up and villages were burnt in what developed into a scorched-earth policy.

After the Greek retreat, the Turkish forces managed to retake Sivrihisar on September 20, Aziziye on September 22 and Bolvadin and Çay on September 24.

== Aftermath ==
Map of Greek and Turkish offensives.

The retreat from Sakarya marked the end of the Greeks' hopes to impose a settlement on Turkey by the force of arms. In May 1922, Papoulas and his complete staff resigned and was replaced by General Georgios Hatzianestis, who proved much more inept than his predecessor.

On the other hand, Mustafa Kemal returned to Ankara, where the Grand National Assembly awarded him the rank of Field Marshal of the Army and the title of Gazi to render its honours as the saviour of the Turkish nation.

According to the speech that was delivered years later before the same National Assembly at the Second General Conference of the Republican People's Party, which took part from October 15 to 20, 1927, Ataturk was said to have ordered that "not an inch of the country should be abandoned until it was drenched with the blood of the citizens" once he realised that the Turkish Army was losing ground rapidly and that virtually no natural defences were left between the battle line and Ankara.

Lord Curzon argued that the military situation became a stalemate with time tending favour the Turks. Their reputation by the British was improving. In his opinion, the Turkish nationalists were more than ready to negotiate.

The Ankara government then signed the Treaty of Kars with the Russians and the most important Treaty of Ankara with the French, which reduced the Turkish army's front notably in the Cilician theatre and allowed it to concentrate against the Greeks to the west.

For the Turkish troops, the battle was the turning point of the war, which would develop in a series of important military clashes against the Greeks and drive the invaders out of Asia Minor during the Turkish War of Independence. The Greeks could do nothing but fight to secure their retreat. Next year, on August 26, the Turkish offensive started with Battle of Dumlupınar. Ataturk dispatched his army on a drive to the coast of the Aegean Sea to pursue the Greek Army. That would culminate in the direct assault of Smyrna from September 9 to 11, 1922.

The war ended by the withdrawal of the Greeks from Asia Minor, as would be formalised by the Treaty of Lausanne, on 24 July 1923.

== Assessment ==
=== Naming ===
It is also known as the Officers' Battle (Turkish: Subaylar Savaşı) in Turkey because of the unusually high casualty rate (70–80%) among the officers. It's also called the Sangarios–Agkyra Campaign (Greek: Εκστρατεία Σαγγαρίου–Άγκυρας) in Greece.

Generally, in Turkish sources "Sakarya" is used, while Greek sources use both "Sakarya" and "Ankara". Although the fighting occurred in the Polatlı–Haymana region, these names curiously do not appear as names of the battle in any historical sources.

=== Significance ===
The Battle of the Sakarya is considered to be the turning point of the Turkish War of Independence. During the battle, the Greek press compared the offensive to Alexander the Great's cutting of the Gordian Knot, a legend associated with the ancient city of Gordion, situated directly on top of the battlefield. According to the legend, whoever untied the knot was destined to rule all of Asia. Alexander, instead, cut it with his sword, a prophecy associated with Alexander's subsequent conquest of the Persian Empire and invoked in connection with King Constantine I of Greece and Sakarya itself. Greek soldiers passing through Gordion were emotionally moved by its historical significance and symbolism, regarding themselves as continuing Alexander's mission.

After the battle, Turkish observer, writer, and literary critic İsmail Habip Sevük described its importance with these words: "The retreat that started in Vienna on 13 September 1683 stopped 238 years later". It was also called Melhâme-i Kübrâ (Islamic equivalent to Armageddon) by Mustafa Kemal Atatürk, while also earning comparisons to Napoleon's failed invasion of Russia.

=== Military analysis ===
The battle was a military stalemate (with some Greek sources going as far as to call it a Greek tactical victory), but, despite this, it was also a huge Greek strategic failure. A British military attaché noted in December 1921: "The true wonder is not that the Greek Army failed to gain decisive success but that it went so near to gaining it".

The battle is considered a classic illustration of Carl von Clausewitz’s concept of a "culminating point", at which an offensive pushed too far yields the advantage to the defender. Others also see it as an illustration of Clausewitz's countervailing principle of "continuity", which holds that an insufficiently aggressive follow-up of an initial victory can lead to unnecessary defeat.

Historian Roderick Beaton writes that the battle "was very nearly won by the Greeks", as the Turkish Nationalists had prepared to abandon Ankara and Mustafa Kemal himself may have considered giving up the struggle. Historian George W. Gawrych wrote that, had the Greeks somehow managed to launch the offensive one week earlier, the Turkish Army might have been imperiled by the Greek forces. Military historian George Sayen further argues that, following the Turkish defeat at Eskişehir, Kemal faced substantial opposition within his own movement and that a second defeat, followed by the loss of Ankara, could potentially have resulted in his removal, a leadership struggle, or even civil conflict.

Sayen argues that the Greek advance towards Ankara was not a mistake, as has been often said, because halting at Eskişehir or withdrawing towards Smyrna would have allowed the Turkish Nationalists to recover and strengthen their forces. Instead, Sayen attributes the failure partly to the Greek command's overly cautious and complicated battle plan, which involved a southern flanking manoeuvre through difficult, dry terrain that exhausted the troops, extended supply lines and deprived the army of adequate reserves. Sayen suggests that a more direct assault across the Middle Sakarya River might have been more effective, with fewer logistical difficulties and greater opportunities for success.

Sayen adds that Greek commanders delayed the offensive for 20 days, allowing the Turks to regroup, while also committing only 70% of their forces on the offensive, while Turks threw approximately 85% of theirs. According to him, "at least four regiments, amounting to a reinforced division in strength, might have been made available later in the battle without unduly weakening the army’s flanks and rear areas", adding that this "could potentially have made a significant difference to the battle’s outcome" and that they could've been safely deployed without seriously weakening the army's other positions, such as Afyonkarahisar. For example, the Independent Division, stationed at Gemlik, was potentially available but was not deployed until after the battle.

Sayen also writes that the Turkish counterattack's achievements were more limited than certain accounts suggest, with many of them being repulsed. The Greek army advanced approximately 20 kilometres, overran two Turkish defensive lines and captured Mount Çal, threatening to split the Turkish front, with Turkish counteroffensives achieving only limited successes. Sayen questions whether the Greek withdrawal was necessary, arguing that the Greek command may have abandoned the offensive prematurely, despite the possibility of further success. Sayen concludes by rhetorically asking: "Was the [Greek] army beaten or only its commanders?"

Military historian Ernest Tucker further wrote that the Turkish army was "on the verge of collapse" and that Commander Anastasios Papoulas "apparently panicked" after capturing Mount Çal and ordered a withdrawal which reversed momentum and ultimately squandered the Greek advance. Retired Lt. Gen. Konstantinos Papadimitriou refuses to hold Papoulas entirely responsible for the withdrawal because none of the corps commanders raised serious objections at the time. Despite these circumstances, historian Edward J. Erickson praises Papoulas for keeping the army intact and for the "brilliant retreat to Eskişehir under difficult and demanding conditions", adding also that Ismet İnönü could not defeat Papoulas either "intellectually or psychologically".

== Gallery ==
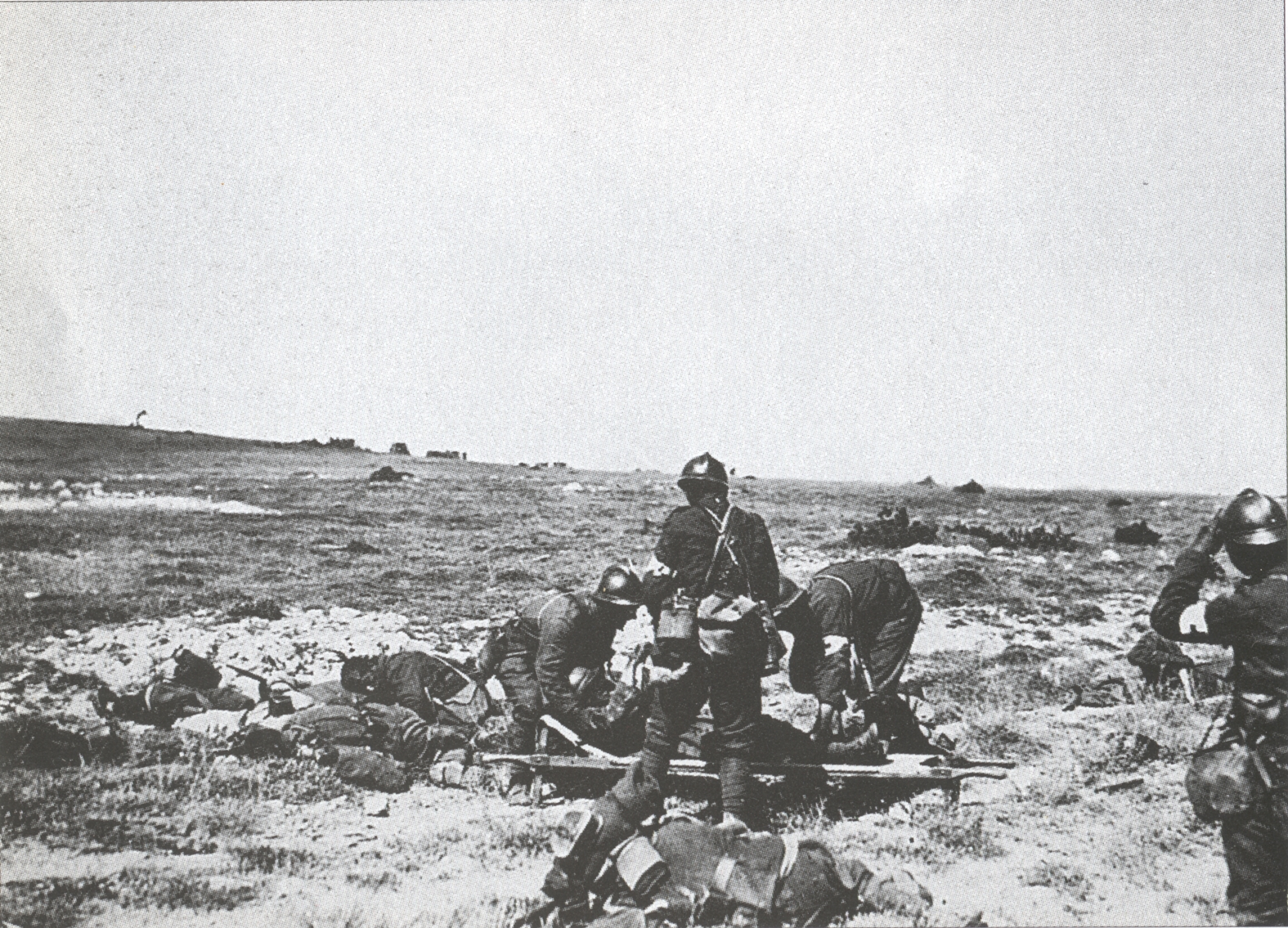
Evacuation of wounded Greek soldiers

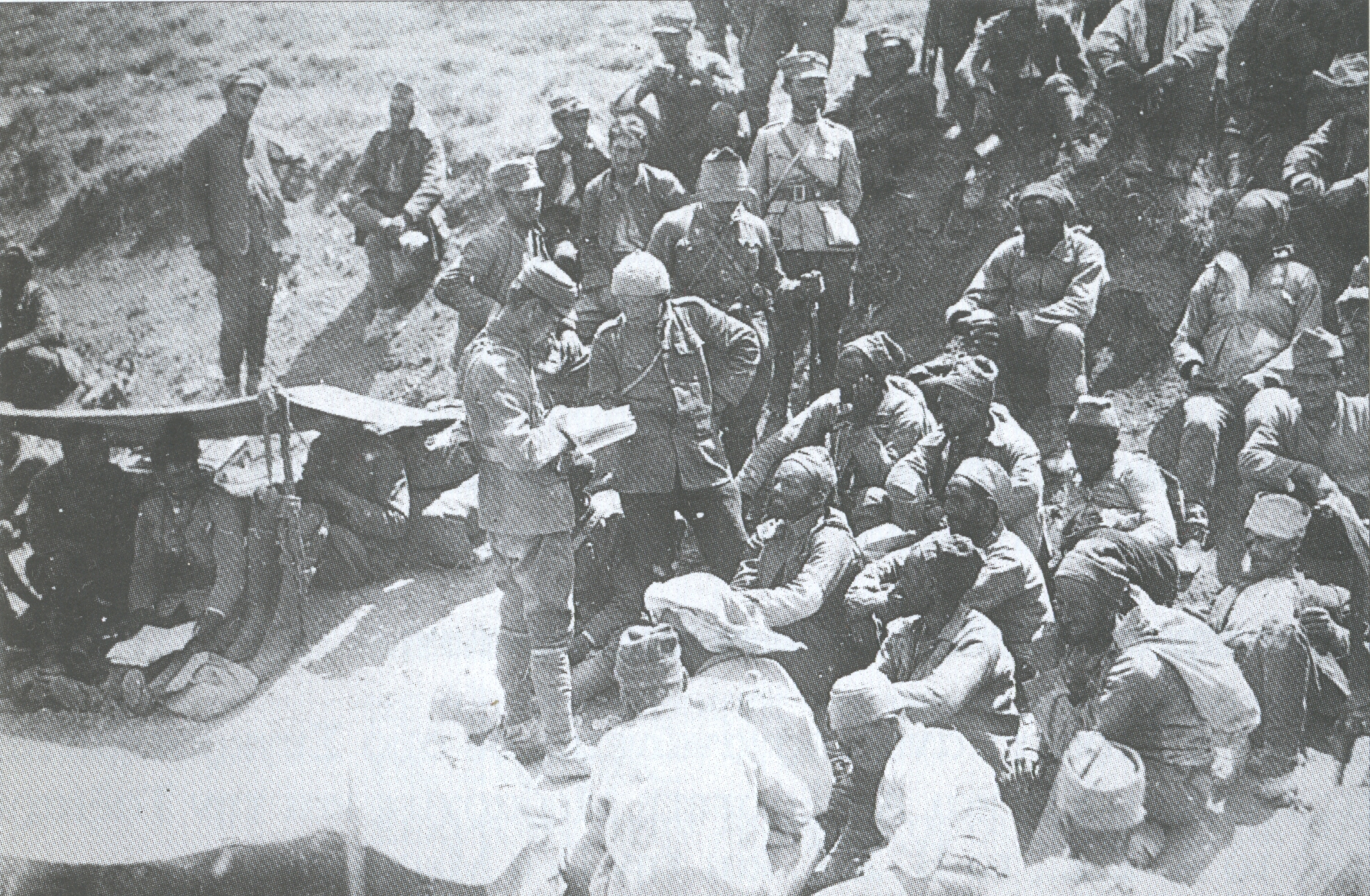
Collection of Turkish prisoners

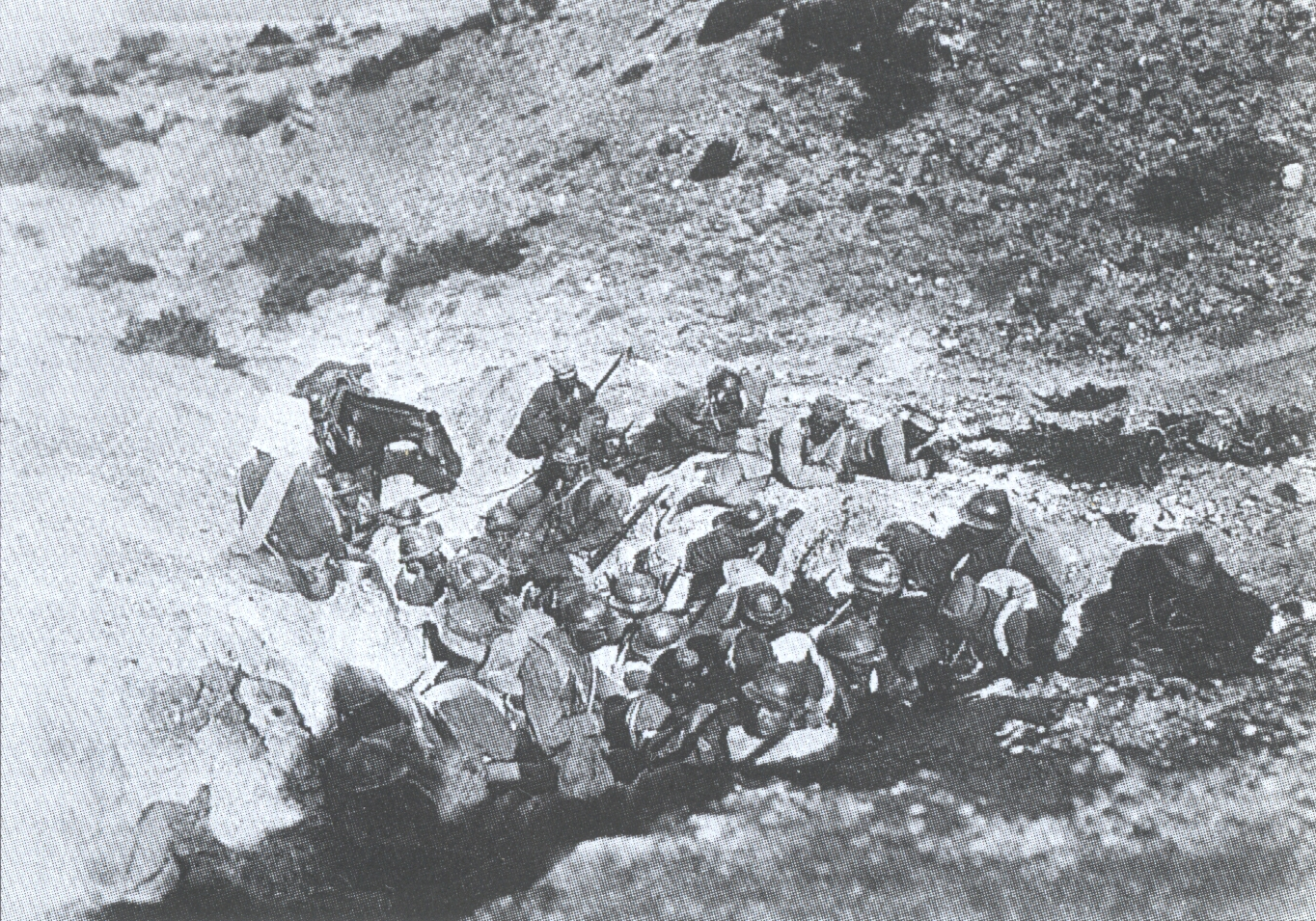
Greek infantry awaits order to attack

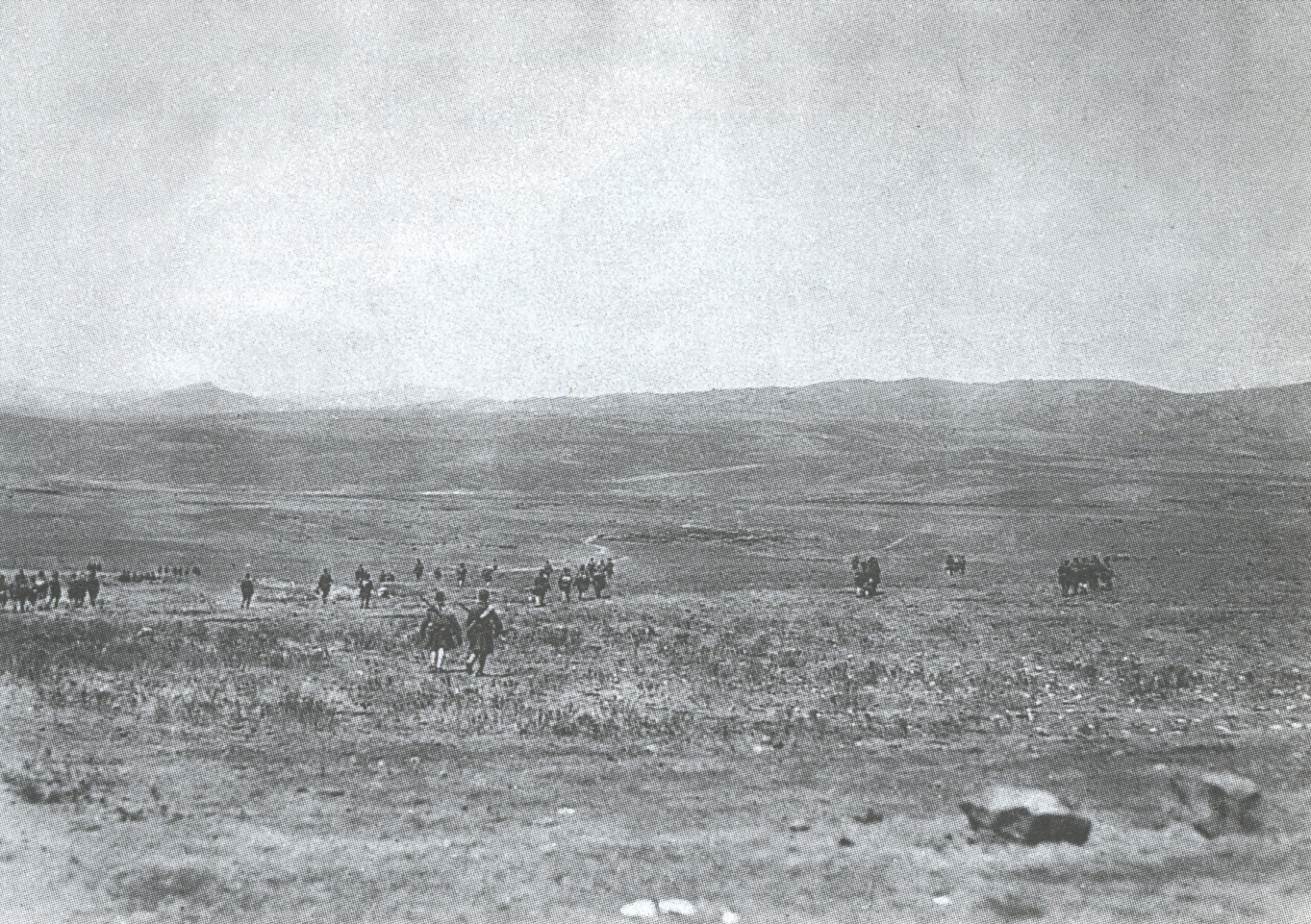
Greek infantry approaches the heights of Polatlı

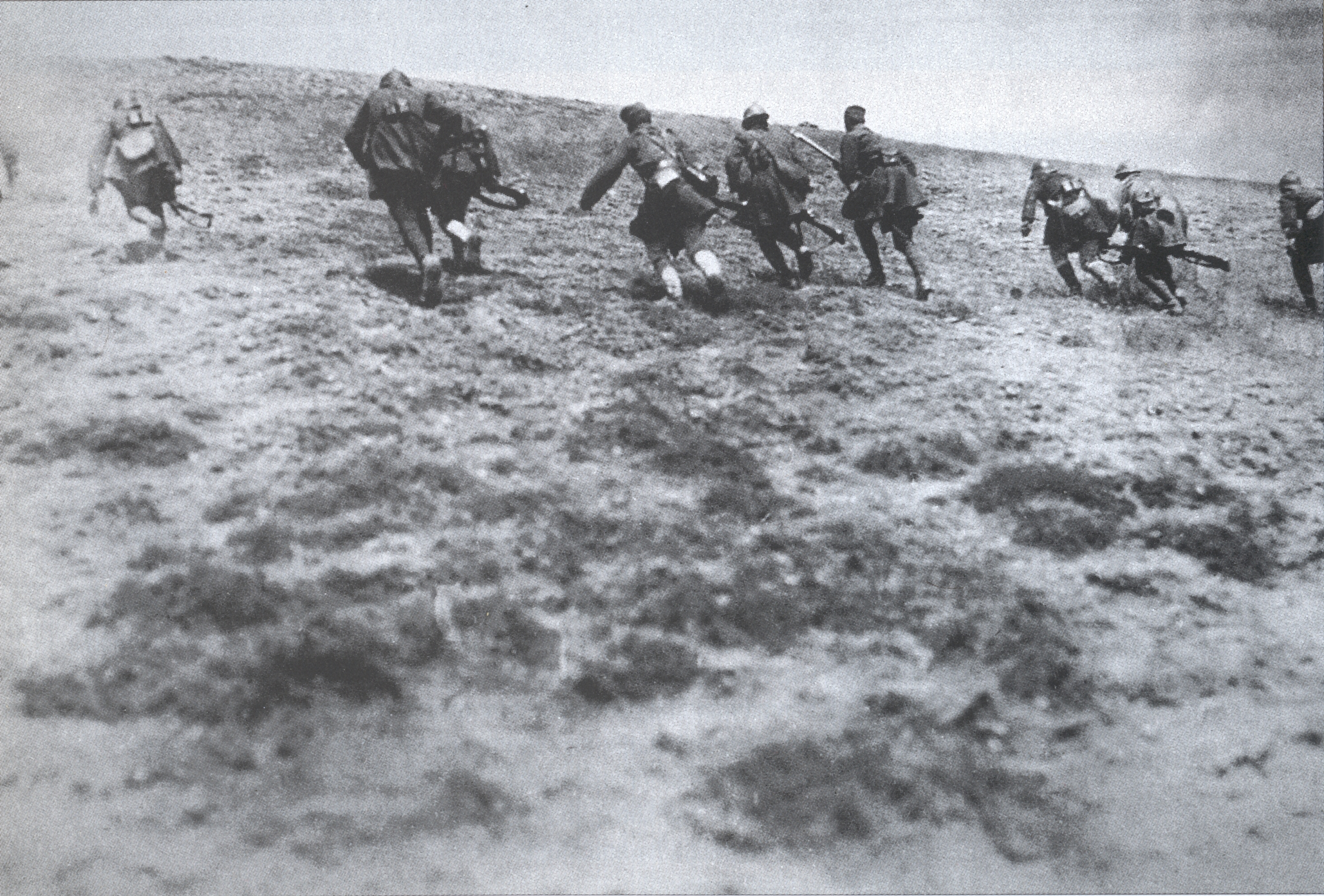
Evzones attack

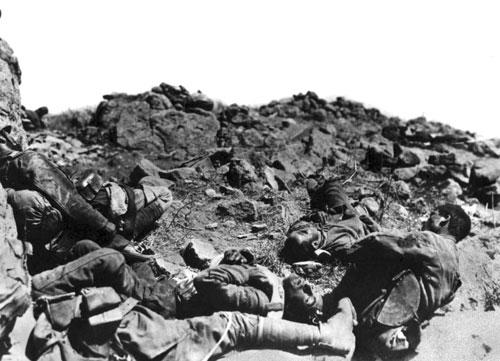
Bodies of Greek soldiers after the Battle of the Sakarya

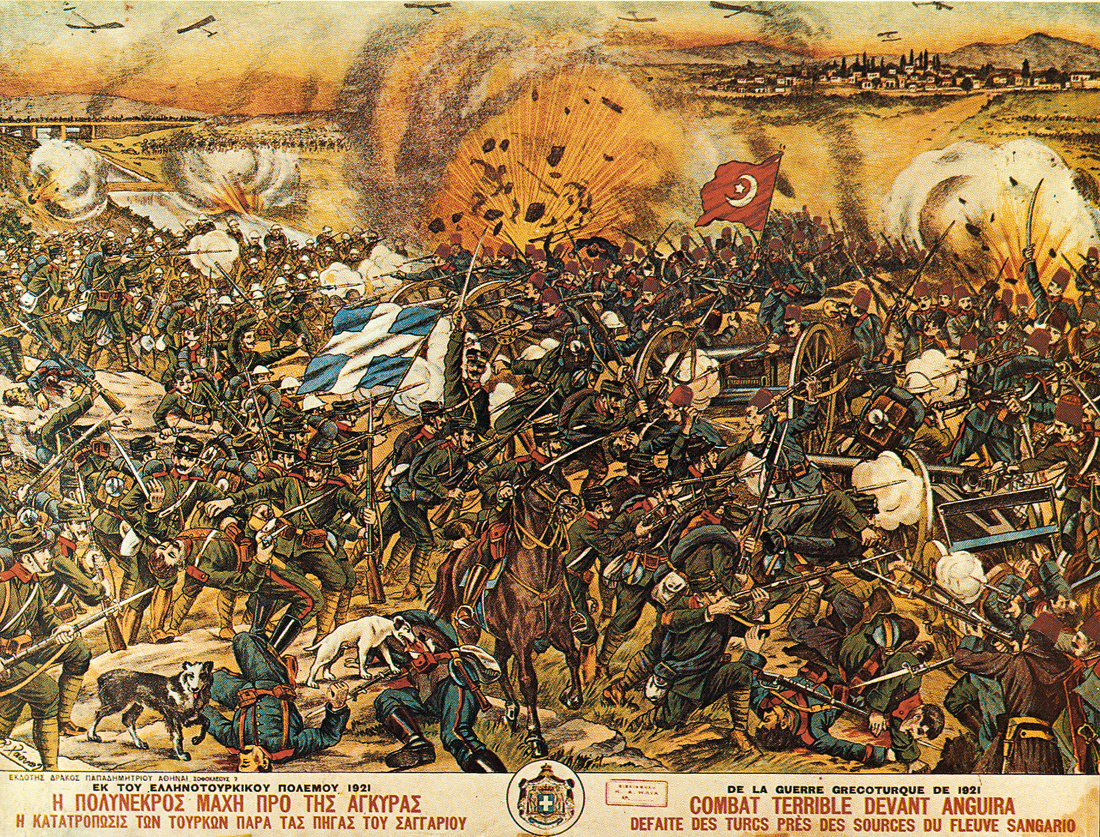
Greek lithograph of the era, depicting the battle as a Greek victory

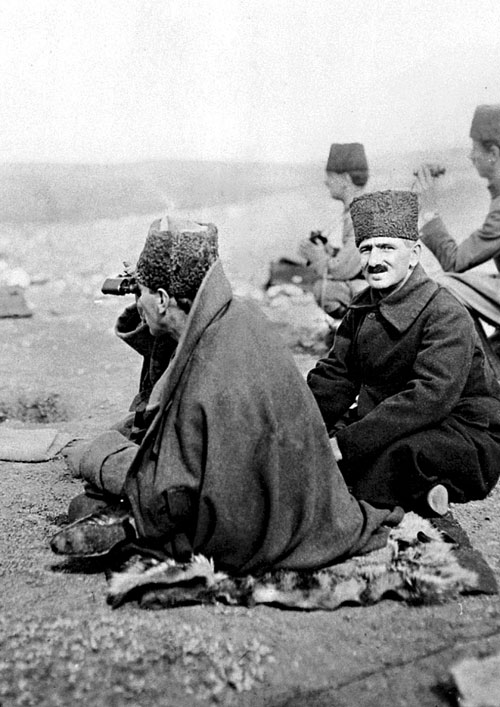
Mustafa Kemal and Salih (Bozok) at Duatepe Hill, observing enemy positions

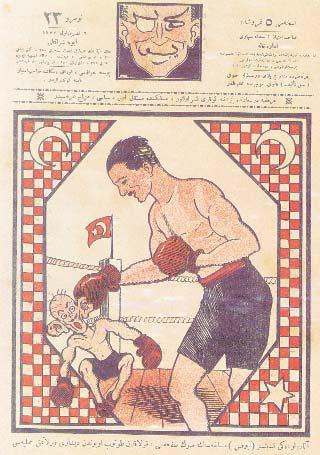
"Anatolia's present to Greece on the occasion of the new year". Political cartoon published one month after the battle

== See also ==
- First Battle of İnönü
- Second Battle of İnönü
- Mehmetçik Monument

== Bibliography ==
- Smith, Michael Llewellyn (1973), Ionian Vision – Greece in Asia Minor 1919–1922, Hurst & Company London, ISBN 1-85065-413-1
- Chant, Christopher (1988), Warfare of the 20th. Century – Armed Conflicts Outside the Two World Wars, Chartwell Books Inc. New Jersey, ISBN 1-85065-413-1

== See also ==
- Order of battle for the Battle of Sakarya
