= Conference of London of 1921–1922 =

Post World War I conference

The Conference of London (21 February and 12 March 1921 and March 1922, London, Great Britain) was a conference convened in order to deal with the problems resulting from the peace treaties that ended World War I, most notably the Treaty of Sèvres with the Ottoman Empire, which was militarily opposed by the Turkish National Movement.

== First stage ==
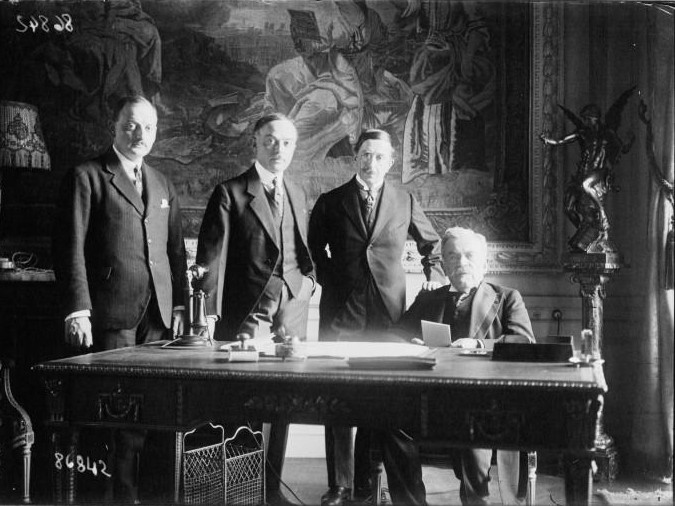
Members of the Greek delegation to the February 1921 London Conference. From right: Prime Minister and Foreign Minister Nikolaos Kalogeropulos, extraordinary envoy Kaftantzoglou, Colonel Ptolemaios Sarigiannis, staff officer in the Army of Asia Minor, and the naval advisor, Commander Bouboulis (BNF/Agence Meurisse).

To salvage the Treaty of Sèvres, a diplomatic conference was held in London between 21 February and 12 March 1921. The Triple Entente forced the nationalists to agree with the Constantinople government. Bekir Sami (Kunduh), representative of Ankara, insisted that the delegate from Constantinople could not enter the negotiations and rejected the use of Sèvres as the basis of the talks. Sèvres had been negotiated with the Ottoman Empire, not with the nationalist movement of Turkey based in Ankara.

== Second stage ==
Another meeting in London was held in March 1922. The Allies, without considering the extent of Ankara's successes, hoped to impose modified Sevres as a peace settlement on Ankara. The Entente foreign ministers proposed Ankara to establish an Armenian state in eastern Anatolia, removing Turkish troops from the Straits area. Also stipulated was the Turkish abandonment to the Greeks of Smyrna and eastern Thrace, including Adrianople. In return, the Allies offered to raise the Sèvres limits on the Turkish army to 85,000 men, eliminating the European financial controls over the Turkish government, but retaining the Capitulations and Public Debt Commission. These proposals were completely at odds with the National Pact of the last Ottoman Parliament, making it easy for the Ankara Assembly to reject them.

== Reactions ==
In the 4th World Congress of the Communist International, in November–December 1922 and just a month after the Kemalist victory against Greece, the Soviets commented retrospectively to the Conferences of London and noted that "the Ankara government is a treasonous government".
