= 1920 Greek parliamentary election =

- 14 November 1920

All 369 seats in the Hellenic Parliament 186 seats needed for a majority
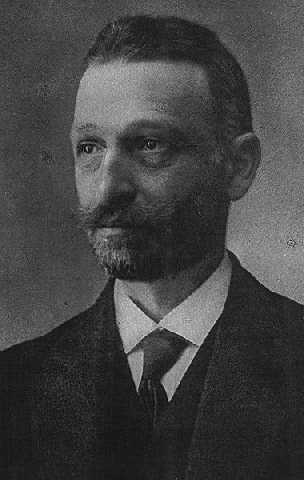

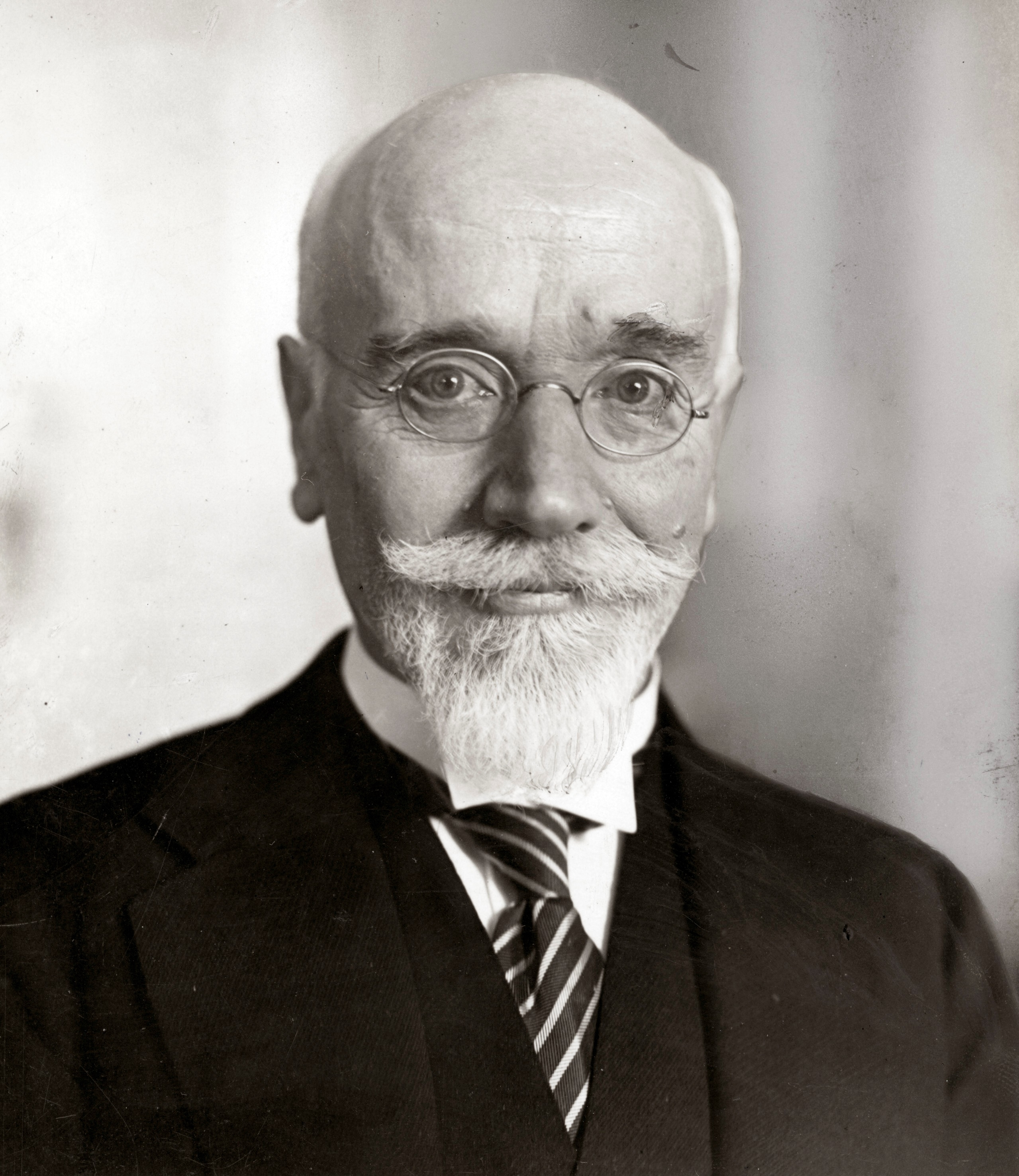
	First party	Second party
Leader	Dimitrios Gounaris	Eleftherios Venizelos
Party	IA	Liberal
Seats won	251	118
Popular vote	368,678	375,803
Percentage	49.36%	50.31%
Prime Minister before election
Eleftherios Venizelos
Liberal
Prime Minister after election
Dimitrios Gounaris
People's Party

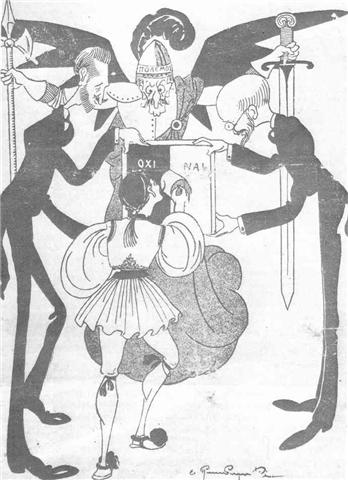
1920 Caricature in the Greek press, where the Greek voter is called upon to choose between Gounaris or Venizelos under the eyes of War

Parliamentary elections were held in Greece on Sunday, 14 November 1920, or 1 November 1920 old style. They were possibly the most crucial elections in the modern history of Greece, as they led to the complete reshuffling of the upper echelons of the Hellenic Army and to the loss of important diplomatic support, both of which largely contributed to the Greek defeat by Kemal Atatürk's reformed Turkish Land Forces in 1922.

The elections also set the stage for Greece's political landscape for most of the rest of the 20th century. It had been nearly five years since the last elections, a period during which all democratic procedures were suspended due to the National Schism, when Prime Minister Eleftherios Venizelos announced that elections would take place on 25 October. However, after the unexpected death of King Alexander, who had assumed the throne after the exile of his father, King Constantine I, the elections were postponed until 14 November.

Venizelos believed a victory for his Liberal Party was all but certain because of his diplomatic and military successes against the Ottoman Empire. However, the results were a disaster for him. Although his Liberal Party received just over 50% of the vote, it won only 118 of the 369 seats in the Hellenic Parliament, with the United Opposition – an alliance of the People's Party, Conservative Party, Reform Party and others – winning 251 of the 369 seats. Venizelos also failed to win a seat. Humiliated and disappointed by the outcome of the election, Venizelos left the country for France, leaving his Liberal Party to the administration of Panagiotis Dagklis.

== Electoral system ==
The elections were held using a "winner-takes-it-all" multiple non-transferable vote system, with voters having as many votes as there were seats in their constituency. Constituencies were based on the provinces, with provinces with a populations of under 10,000 having one seat, with others having one additional seat for every 10,000 people. Voters did not vote for a party, but rather for specific candidates (bullet voting).

== Results ==
The opposition had a highly esteemed leader in Dimitrios Gounaris and managed turn the elections into a referendum on the exiled King Constantine I, who was still popular especially in Old Greece. It was also thought that voters were tired after almost a decade of wars and division were tempted by the United Opposition promise to secure peace with the Turks and bring troops home.

Party	Votes	%	Seats
Liberal Party	375,803	50.31	118
United Opposition	368,678	49.36	251
Others	2,465	0.33	0
Total	746,946	100.00	369
Source: Greek Institute of Constitutional History

=== Analysis ===
==== Constituency size ====
The system used "wide districts" instead of "narrow districts". Because these wide districts contained a large number of seats, the final nationwide distribution of seats became highly dependent on the swings of just a few thousand critical voters. For example, in Atticoboeotia, the Republicans failed to win a single seat, leaving Venizelos himself out of the parliament, despite receiving 45% of the popular vote.

==== Minority vote ====
Minorities' votes were crucial in the elections. The anti-Venizelist voting behavior of the "just-incorporated-into-Greece" minorities, such as Turks and Jews, helped secure the electoral loss of Venizelos and his party. Some scholars cite this as the main reason for the defeat of Venizelos' Liberal Party. Greek political scientist and historian George Th. Mavrogordatos wrote the following: "Antivenizelism again carried 69 out of the 74 Macedonia seats, but this time those seats would have given a small nationwide majority to Venizelism (187 out of 369) if it had taken them all. And this would have happened almost certainly if the minorities had not voted for Antivenizelism, or even if they had not voted at all".

There is some debate on whether the voting pattern of minorities was a deciding factor; Greek-Jewish author Sam Hassid has cast doubt on this, noting the "father of the reservist soldier" as a crucial voter and, majorly, the voting system itself as the most important factor for Venizelos' loss. He also notes how some Muslims and, apparently, one-third of Greek Jews voted for Venizelos.

== Aftermath ==
After Venizelos lost the elections, including his own parliament seat, Leonidas Paraskevopoulos immediately began plans for a coup d'etat. However, Venizelos recommended against it and proposed to simply accept the results, thus annulling the decision.

Venizelos proceeded to leave the country for France, leaving his Liberal Party to the administration of Panagiotis Dagklis. By then, he was a "broken man", according to William Miller. Venizelos blamed himself for the defeat, believing that he had "asked too much of the Greek people" and that continuous drafting had caused aversion against him. He also told Granville Leveson-Gower, 3rd Earl Granville that the Greek people could not be blamed for the results of the elections; Venizelos requested this statement to be forwarded to the government of Britain.

After the new government was sworn in, the upper echelons of the Army of Asia Minor were completely reshuffled, with Venizelist officers being replaced with Royalist ones. The lower echelons were mostly left intact, but the change in the upper echelons were drastic, catalytic and had far-reaching consequences. In addition, 20 Turkish MPs (all from Thrace) which were elected with the Liberal Party became independents, pledging allegiance to the new government. As a result, the Liberal MPs were further reduced to 98.

The United Opposition, which won the elections by promising an end to the war to a war-weary electorate, did not honor this promise and continued military operations in Asia Minor for two more years. The new government was confronted with a dangerous military situation, deteriorating finances, and the allies blocking financial support due to King Constantine's return. However, they argued that the campaign could not be stopped and had to continue to bring an end to the Greek genocide. Many other military, economic and diplomatic factors, such as Greece being already "locked in" by the time the elections were held, made a clean exit from the war politically and diplomatically very difficult. Although the issue of ending the war was, indeed, a popular demand in Greece, the new government found out that the issue could not be handled easily. Historian Ioannis V. Daskarolis summarized that "despite the soldiers' expectations of demobilization, the anti-Venizelist government continued the Asia Minor Campaign for a number of important reasons that made any other course of action impossible".

Only the British Prime Minister David Lloyd George openly continued his support for Greece until the end of the war and the British Foreign Office continued efforts to maintain the Treaty of Sèvres through negotiation. The Conference of London of 1921–1922 was held in order to achieve peace, but failed, not only because Greece and the Turkish side disagreed, but also because the Allied front broke apart.
