= First Battle of İnönü =

1921 battle of the Turkish War of Independence

- Part of the Greco-Turkish War (1919–22)
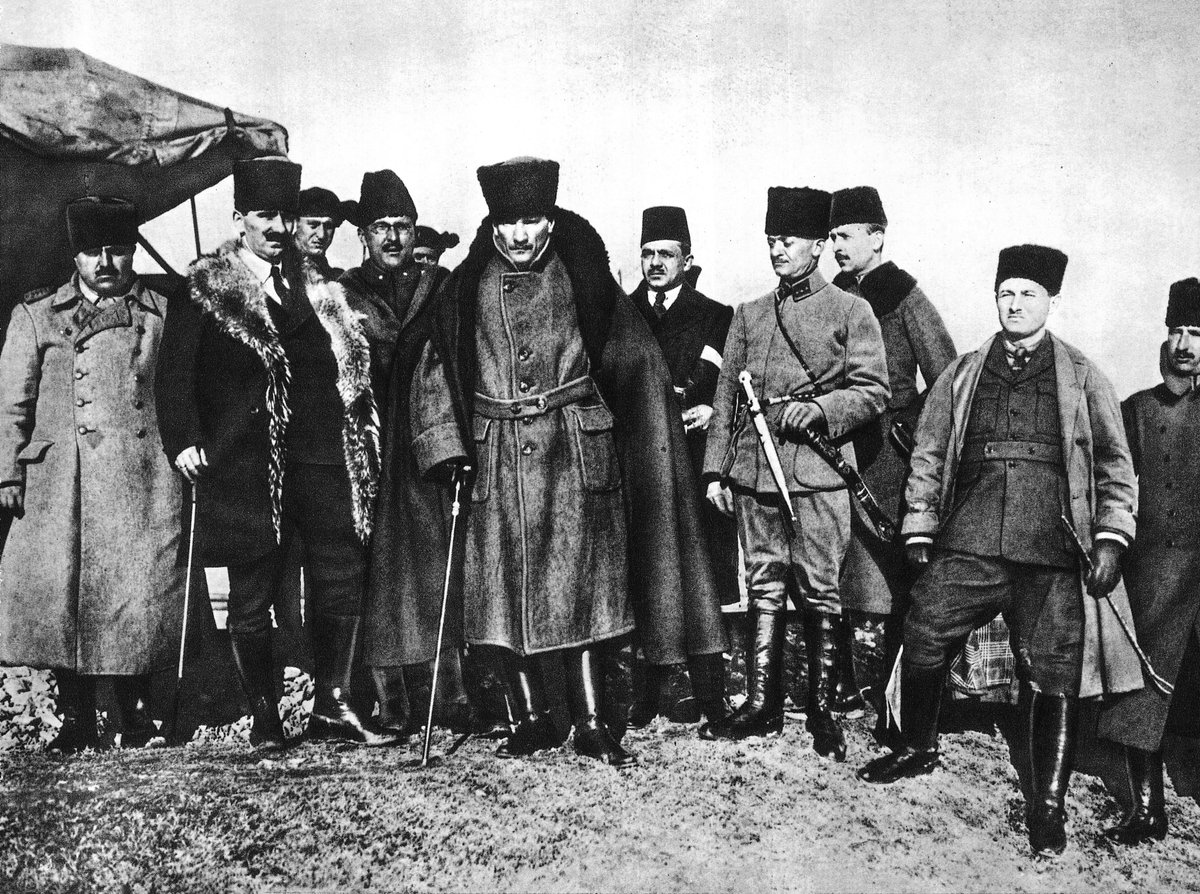
- Mustafa Kemal at the end of the First Battle of İnönü
| Date | 6–11 January 1921 |
| Location | Near İnönü, Eskişehir, Turkey |
| Result | Stalemate/Inconclusive: Greek tactical success; Greek strategic failure; Both sides forced to retreat |

Belligerents
| Ankara Government | (Kingdom of Greece) Greece |

Commanders and leaders
| İsmet Pasha | Anastasios Papoulas |

Strength
| 8,500 soldiers | 7,500–9,000 soldiers |

Casualties and losses
| 95 killed 183 wounded 211 prisoners | 51 killed 130 wounded |

The First Battle of İnönü (Turkish: Birinci İnönü Muharebesi) took place between 6 and 11 January 1921 near İnönü in Hüdavendigâr Vilayet (present-day Eskişehir Province, Turkey) during the Greco-Turkish War (1919–22), also known as the western front of the larger Turkish War of Independence. This was the first battle for the Army of the Grand National Assembly that was newly built standing army (Düzenli ordu) in place of irregular troops.

== Battle ==
A Greek reconnaissance force under General Anastasios Papoulas began to move from their base in Bursa in the direction of Eskişehir in early January 1921. The battle began with a Greek assault on the positions of Miralay (Colonel) İsmet Pasha's troops near the railway station of İnönü on January 9, 1921 and the fighting continued until dark. On January 10, the Greek Islands division began moving along the Kovalca-Akpınar line, and the İzmir division was moving on Yeniköy-Teke-Hayriye direction and additional forces were moving on Söğüt-Gündüzbey line. Additionally Çerkes Ethem turned against the new central government in Ankara, refusing to join his forces with the regular army established under the command of İsmet İnönü. The newly reconstituted Turkish army had to put down his rebellion while also fighting the Greeks.

The better-equipped Greeks taking advantage of the fog pushed back the Turks around the railroad protected by the 11th Division and took the dominant hill called Metristepe where fighting continued till 2pm.

Ferik Fevzi Çakmak, following the recommendation of the commander of the Western Front Miralay İsmet İnönü, gave the order to pull back to Beşkardeşdağı-Zemzemiye-Oklubalı line and moved the headquarters to Çukurhisar.

After capturing the Akpınar-Kovalca line, Greeks stopped the attack and dug in. Upon observing the Turkish positions being reinforced with the 61st Division, they realized that the Turks were determined to hold there and not fall back any further. Not feeling quite ready to withstand on the battlefield, the Greeks vacated the İnönü vicinity and pulled back on January 11. The Turks were unable to pursue the Greeks not only because of exhaustion and lack of supplies but also because of the need to suppress Çerkes Ethem as well as the Green Army.

== Results ==
Politically, the battle was significant as the arguments within the Turkish National Movement were concluded in the favor of the institution of a centralized control of the Army of the Grand National Assembly. As a result of his performance at İnönü, Colonel İsmet was made a general. Also, the prestige gained in the aftermath of the battle helped the revolutionaries to announce the Turkish Constitution of 1921 on January 20, 1921. Internationally, the Turkish revolutionaries proved themselves as a military force. The prestige gained in the aftermath of the battle helped revolutionaries to initiate a new round of negotiations with Soviet Russia which ended with the Treaty of Moscow on March 16, 1921.

The second round of this small scale encounter, the Second Battle of İnönü was to be replayed within a month in the same area, after the London Conference failed to reconcile the differences between the two sides.
