= United Opposition (Greece) =

United Opposition Ηνωμένη Αντιπολίτευσις
- Leader: Dimitrios Gounaris
- Founded: 1920
- Dissolved: 1922
- Ideology: National conservatism Anti-Venizelism; Monarchism; Nationalism; Conservatism
- Political position: Right-wing

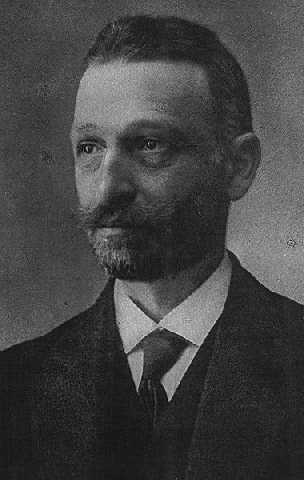
Dimitrios Gounaris.

The United Opposition (Greek: Ηνωμένη Αντιπολίτευσις) was a coalition of anti-Venizelist Greek political parties for the elections of 1920.

Its main leader was Dimitrios Gounaris. Members to the coalition were:

- People's Party
- Kyriakoulis Mavromichalis' party National party
- Nikolaos Stratos' party Reform party
- Modernist party
- and other small right-wing and anti-Venizelist parties
