= Greco-Turkish War (1919–1922) =

Conflict between the Kingdom of Greece and the Turkish National Movement

Greco-Turkish War of 1919–1922
- Part of the Turkish War of Independence
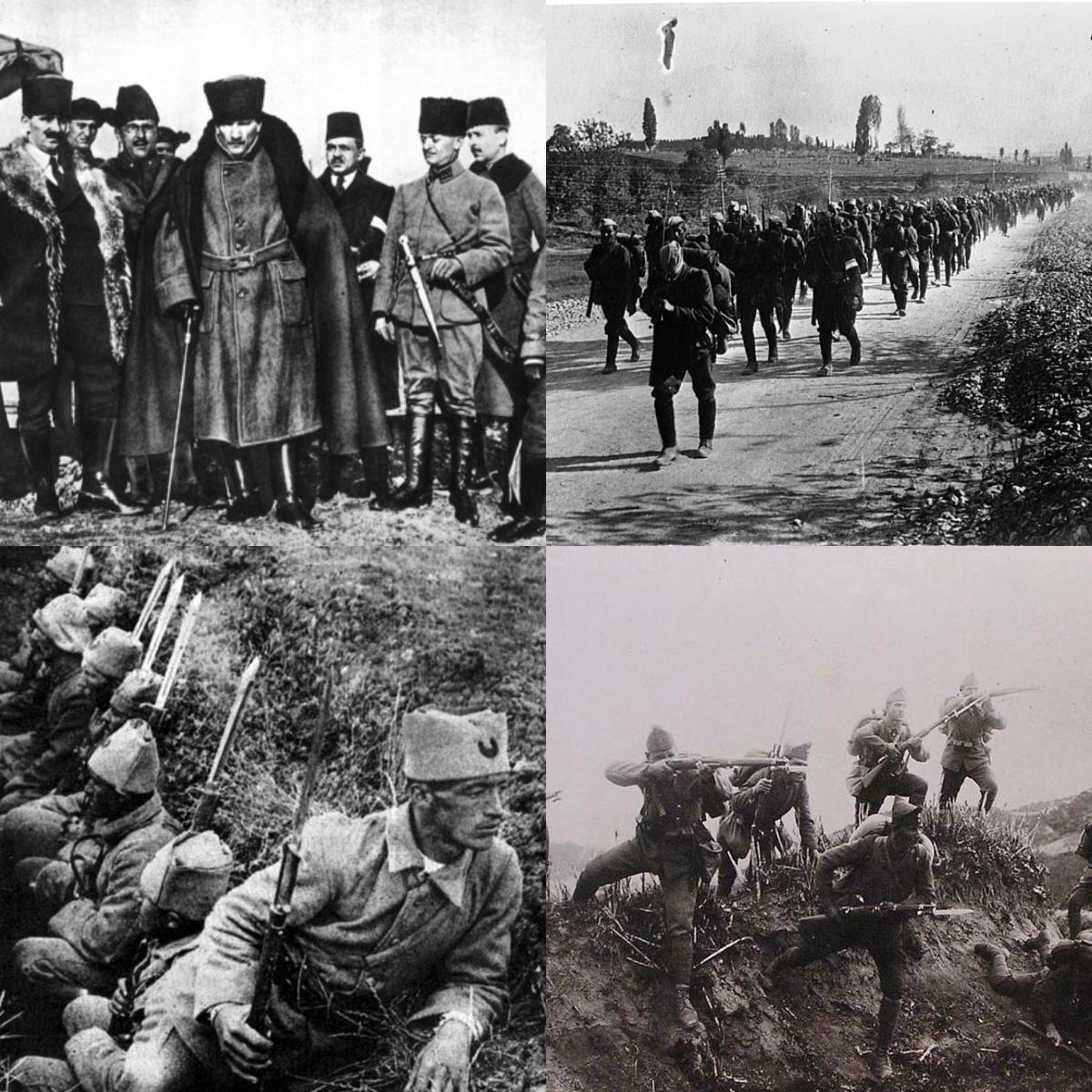
- Clockwise from top left: Mustafa Kemal at the end of the First Battle of İnönü; Greek soldiers retreat during the last stages; Greek infantry charge in river Gediz; Turkish infantry in trench.
Date	15 May 1919 – 14 October 1922 (3 years, 4 months, 4 weeks and 1 day) (Note: The war formally ended with the Treaty of Lausanne, signed on 24 July 1923.)
Location	Western Anatolia
Result	Turkish victory
Territorial changes	Lands initially ceded to the Kingdom of Greece from the Ottoman Empire are incorporated into the Republic of Turkey.

Belligerents
Turkish National Movement	Greece

Commanders and leaders
Mustafa Kemal Pasha; Fevzi Pasha; İsmet Pasha; Nureddin Pasha; Fahrettin Altay Pasha; Kemalettin Sami Pasha; Yusuf Izzet Pasha; Ali Fuat Pasha; Muhittin Pasha; Naci Pasha; Ömer Halis Pasha; Münip Pasha; Rüştü Pasha; Şefik Pasha; Refet Pasha	Alexander I; Eleftherios Venizelos; Dimitrios Ioannou; Konstantinos Miliotis-Komninos; Leonidas Paraskevopoulos; Alexandros Othonaios; Nikolaos Plastiras; Konstantinos Nider; After the November 1920 Greek elections purge: Constantine I of Greece; Dimitrios Gounaris; Anastasios Papoulas; Prince Andrew; Nikolaos Trikoupis; Kimon Digenis; Konstantinos Pallis; Georgios Hatzianestis; Georgios Polymenakos; Nikolaos Plastiras; Konstantinos Nider

Units involved
National Forces; Nationalist Army	(Kingdom of Greece) Army of Asia Minor (Kingdom of Greece) Army of Thrace (Kingdom of Greece) Army of Evros (Ottoman Empire) Caliphate Army

Strength
May 1919: 2,000 (Note: The Turks fought only with irregular units (Kuva-yi Milliye, i.e. the National Forces) in the years 1919 and 1920. The Turks established their regular army (Kuva-yi Nizamiye), i.e. the Nationalist Army under the Ankara Government, towards the end of 1920. The First Battle of İnönü was the first battle where regular army units fought against the Greek army.); November 1920: 86,000; August 1921: 92,000; August 1922: 208,000; Organization 1922: 18 infantry divisions; 5 cavalry brigades; 3 independent regiments; Equipment 1922: 93,000 rifles; 2,025 light machine guns; 839 heavy machine guns; 323 cannons; 5,282 swords; 198 trucks; 33 cars and ambulances; 10 aircraft	May 1919: 15,000; April 1920: 90,000; January 1921: 100,000; June 1921: 200,000; 1922: 215,000; Organization 1922: 12 infantry divisions; 1 cavalry brigade; 9 independent regiments (Note: One Greek division had at least 25% more men than a Turkish division. In 1922, Turkish divisions had 7,000–8,000 men averagely, whereas Greek divisions had well over 10,000 men per division.); Equipment 1922: 130,000 rifles; 3,139 light machine guns; 1,280 heavy machine guns; 418 cannons; 1,300 swords; 4,036 trucks; 1,776 cars and ambulances; 50 aircraft

Casualties and losses
9,167 killed; 2,474 died of wounds or non-combat causes; 31,097 wounded; 11,150 missing; 6,522 prisoners**	19,362–25,000 killed; 4,878 died outside of combat; 48,880 wounded; 18,095 missing; c. 13,740; or 55,000 captured*
- 264,000 Greek civilians killed Disputed numbers of Turkish civilians killed. 30,000+ buildings and 250+ villages destroyed and burnt by the Hellenic Army.
- * 20,826 Greek prisoners were taken. Of those about 740 officers and 13,000 soldiers arrived in Greece during the prisoner exchange in 1923. About 7,000 presumably died in Turkish captivity. ** Greece took 22,071 military and civilian prisoners. Of those were 520 officers and 6,002 soldiers. During the prisoner exchange in 1923, 329 officers, 6,002 soldiers and 9,410 civilian prisoners arrived in Turkey. The remaining 6,330, mostly civilian prisoners, presumably died in Greek captivity.: The Turkish Grand National Assembly was opened in 1920.; The National Forces (Kuva-yi Milliye) operated independently between 1919 and 1920 until it was put under the control of the Grand National Assembly.

The Greco-Turkish War of 1919–1922 (Note: It is known as the Western Front (Turkish: Batı Cephesi, Ottoman Turkish: غرب جبهه سی, romanized: Garb Cebhesi) in Turkey, and the Asia Minor Campaign (Greek: Μικρασιατική Εκστρατεία, romanized: Mikrasiatikí Ekstrateía) or the Asia Minor Catastrophe (Greek: Μικρασιατική Καταστροφή, romanized: Mikrasiatikí Katastrofí) in Greece. It is also referred to as the Greek invasion of Anatolia.) was fought between Greece and the Turkish National Movement during the partitioning of the Ottoman Empire in the aftermath of World War I, between 15 May 1919 and 14 October 1922. This conflict was a part of the Turkish War of Independence.

The causes and aims of the war have been debated and interpreted differently in the historiography. One major stated justification for the Greek military campaign was the protection of Greek populations amid continuing violence against Ottoman Greeks. (Note: Multiple sources, including: Tuzzolino, Nicholas J. (2021). "The "Great catastrophe": An analysis of the Greek migration from Asia Minor during and following the Greco-Turkish War of 1919" (PDF). University of La Verne. Fetty Scholars. "The Greco-Turkish War began in the aftermath of World War One, in which the Greeks invaded the Ottoman Empire to put a stop to the Greek Genocide, which had intensified in recent years."; Hofmann, Tessa (2022). "The Great Fire of Smyrna: The End of the Ottoman Genocide Against Christians". Asiatica: Труды по философии и культурам Востока. 16 (1): 8–39. "When the war-weary Entente states found themselves unable to ensure the safety of the Christians in Western Anatolia themselves, they left their protection to Hellenic forces. On 15 May 1919, these forces arrived in the province of Smyrna, which became the protection zone for the Western Anatolian Christians for the next three years."; Llewellyn-Smith, Michael (2023). "The historiography of the Greek-Turkish War in Asia Minor: Britain, Greece, and others, 1915–1923". Byzantine and Modern Greek Studies. 47 (2): 275. "In May 1919, when Lloyd George and his fellow leaders, with the support of Venizelos, authorized the Greek landing of troops at Smyrna, it became evident that this was the start of a process intended by Lloyd George and Venizelos to end in the annexation of western Asia Minor to Greece. The Greek prime minister seems to have calculated that this was his best or only way to save the Greek communities on the west coast from the apparent decision of the Young Turks to eliminate them.") (Note: Multiple sources, including: Cooch, William John (1922). "Turkish Campaigns". In Chisholm, Hugh (ed.). Encyclopædia Britannica. Vol. 32 (12th ed.). Encyclopædia Britannica Company. p. 802.; Bloxham, Donald (2005). The Great Game of Genocide: Imperialism, Nationalism, and the Destruction of the Ottoman Armenians. Oxford University Press. p. 155. ISBN 9780199273560.) By contrast, the Turkish National Movement presented the conflict as a defensive struggle to preserve Turkish homelands against foreign occupation.

The armed conflict started when the Greek forces landed in Smyrna (now İzmir), on 15 May 1919. In the Greek Summer Offensive of 1920, they advanced inland and took control of the western and northwestern part of Anatolia, including the cities of Manisa, Balıkesir, Aydın, Bursa and Uşak, among others. After the November 1920 elections and the fall of Eleftherios Venizelos, the three European Powers (Britain, France and Italy) officially declared neutrality in May 1921.

Nevertheless, in July 1921, another Greek victory in the Battle of Kütahya–Eskişehir imperiled the Turkish forces, with the Greek Army almost reaching Ankara. The latter's advance was finally checked by Turkish forces at the Battle of the Sakarya. After a year-long stalemate punctuated by the 1922 Constantinople crisis, the Greek front eventually collapsed with the Turkish counter-attack in August 1922, and the war effectively ended with the recapture of Smyrna by Turkish forces and the burning of the city.

As a result, the Greek government accepted the demands of the Turkish National Movement and returned to its pre-war borders, thus leaving Eastern Thrace and Western Anatolia to Turkey. The Allies abandoned the Treaty of Sèvres to negotiate a new treaty at Lausanne with the Turkish National Movement. The Treaty of Lausanne recognized the independence of the Republic of Turkey and its sovereignty over Anatolia, Istanbul, and Eastern Thrace. The Greek and Turkish governments agreed to engage in a population exchange.

== Background ==
=== Geopolitical context ===
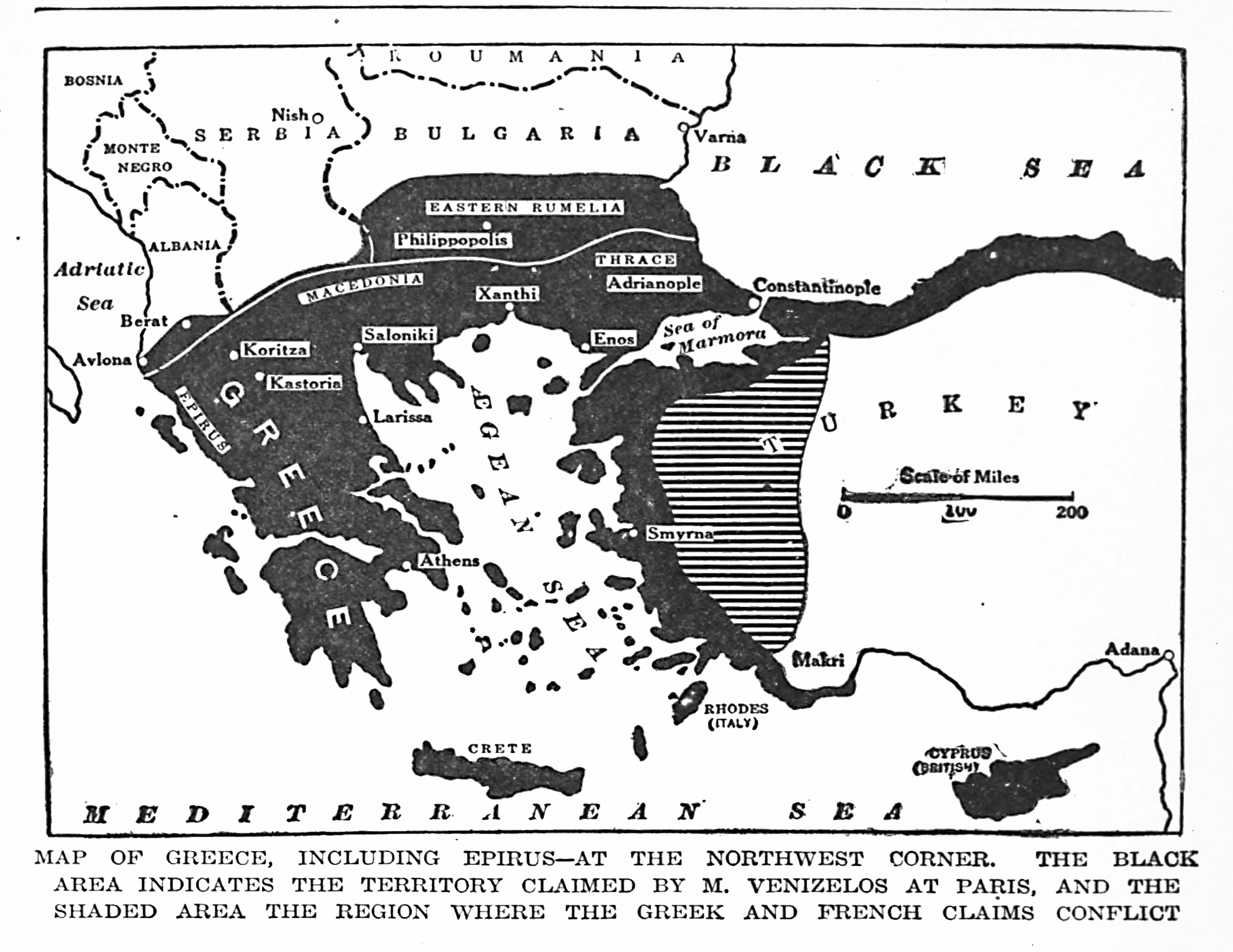
Map of the Megali Idea

The geopolitical context of this conflict is linked to the partitioning of the Ottoman Empire which was a direct consequence of World War I and the involvement of the Ottomans in the Middle Eastern theatre. The Greeks received an order to land in Smyrna by the Triple Entente as part of the partition. During this war, the Ottoman government collapsed completely, and the Ottoman Empire was divided amongst the victorious Entente powers with the signing of the Treaty of Sèvres on 10 August 1920.

There were a number of secret agreements regarding the partitioning of the Ottoman Empire at the end of World War I. The Triple Entente had made contradictory promises about post-war arrangements concerning Greek hopes in Asia Minor.

The western Allies, particularly British Prime Minister David Lloyd George, had promised Greece territorial gains at the expense of the Ottoman Empire if Greece entered the war on the Allied side. These included Eastern Thrace, the islands of Imbros (İmroz, since 29 July 1979 Gökçeada) and Tenedos (Bozcaada), and parts of western Anatolia around the city of Smyrna, which contained sizable ethnic Greek populations.

The Italian and Anglo-French repudiation of the Agreement of St.-Jean-de-Maurienne signed on 26 April 1917, which settled the "Middle Eastern interest" of Italy, was overridden with the Greek occupation, as Smyrna (İzmir) was part of the territory promised to Italy. Before the occupation the Italian delegation to the Paris Peace Conference, 1919, angry about the possibility of the Greek occupation of Western Anatolia, left the conference and did not return to Paris until 5 May. The absence of the Italian delegation from the Conference ended up facilitating Lloyd George's efforts to persuade France and the United States to support Greece and prevent Italian operations in Western Anatolia.

According to some historians, it was the Greek occupation of Smyrna that created the Turkish National movement. Arnold J. Toynbee argues: "The war between Turkey and Greece which burst out at this time was a defensive war for safeguarding of the Turkish homelands in Anatolia. It was a result of the Allied policy of imperialism operating in a foreign state, the military resources and powers of which were seriously under-estimated; it was provoked by the unwarranted invasion of a Greek army of occupation." According to others, the landing of the Greek troops in Smyrna was part of Eleftherios Venizelos's plan, inspired by the Megali Idea, to liberate the large Greek populations in the Asia Minor. Prior to the Great Fire of Smyrna, Smyrna had a greater Greek population than the Greek capital, Athens. Athens, before the population exchange between Greece and Turkey, had a population of 473,000, while the central kaza of Smyrna, according to Ottoman Census, in 1914, had a Greek population of 73,676. The entire Aydın Vilayet including modern İzmir, Manisa, Aydın, and Denizli provinces had a Greek population of 299,096, while the sanjak of Muğla had a Greek population of 19,923.

=== The Greek community in Anatolia ===
One of the reasons proposed by the Greek government for launching the Asia Minor expedition was that there was a sizeable Greek-speaking Orthodox Christian population inhabiting Anatolia that needed protection. Greeks had lived in Asia Minor since antiquity, and in 1912, there were 2.5 million Greeks in the Ottoman Empire. The Ottoman Census of 1906–1907 gives a higher figure for the entire Greek Orthodox population including Orthodox Albanians, Slavic-speakers, Vlachs, Arab Orthodox Christians, of the empire amounted to 2,823,063. According to the Ottoman Census of 1914, the Greek Orthodox population of the Ottoman Empire after losing its Balkan and Aegean Island provinces, including 188,047 Arab Orthodox Christians from modern-day Syria, Lebanon and Israel, was 1,729,738. The suggestion that the Greeks constituted the majority of the population in the lands claimed by Greece has been contested by a number of historians. Cedric James Lowe and Michael L. Dockrill also argued that Greek claims about Smyrna were at best debatable, since Greeks constituted perhaps a bare majority, more likely a large minority in the Smyrna Vilayet, "which lay in an overwhelmingly Turkish Anatolia." Precise demographics are further obscured by the Ottoman policy of dividing the population according to religion rather than descent, language, or self-identification. On the other hand, contemporaneous British and American statistics (1919) support the point that the Greek element was the most numerous in the region of Smyrna, counting 375,000, while Muslims were 325,000.

Comparative demographic figures for Anatolian provinces
Group	1910 Greek Delegation Est.		1912 Patriarchate Est.		1914 Ottoman Census	
Group	Number	%	Number	%	Number	%
Muslims / Turks	8,192,589	75.7%	7,048,662	72.7%	7,228,442	81.8%
Greeks	1,777,146	16.4%	1,788,582	18.5%	939,677	10.6%
Armenians	594,539	5.5%	608,707	6.3%	506,686	5.7%
Jews	39,370	0.4%	37,523	0.4%	96,818	1.1%
Others	219,451	2.0%	218,102	2.3%	68,057	0.8%
Total	10,823,095	100.0%	9,695,506	100.0%	8,839,680	100.0%

Detailed regional breakdown (11 Anatolian provinces)
1910 Greek Delegation Estimates
Province	Turks	Greeks	Armenians	Jews	Others	Total
İstanbul (Asiatic shore) (Note: 1910 estimates include only the Asiatic (Anatolian) shore of İstanbul.)	135,681	70,906	30,465	5,120	16,812	258,984
İzmit	184,960	78,564	50,935	2,180	1,435	318,074
Aydın (İzmir)	974,225	629,002	17,247	24,361	58,076	1,702,911
Bursa	1,346,387	274,530	87,932	2,788	6,125	1,717,762
Konya	1,143,335	85,320	9,426	720	15,356	1,254,157
Ankara	991,666	54,280	101,388	901	12,329	1,160,564
Trabzon	1,047,889	351,104	45,094	–	–	1,444,087
Sivas	933,572	98,270	165,741	–	–	1,197,583
Kastamonu	1,086,420	18,160	3,061	–	1,980	1,109,621
Adana	212,454	88,010	81,250	–	107,240	488,954
Biga	136,000	29,000	2,000	3,300	98	170,398
1914 Official Ottoman Census
Province	Muslims	Greeks	Armenians	Jews	Others	Total
İstanbul (Vilayet) (Note: 1914 census figures cover the full vilayet of İstanbul (both European and Asiatic sides).)	560,434	205,375	72,962	52,126	19,081	909,978
İzmit	226,859	40,048	55,403	428	2,415	325,153
Aydın (İzmir)	1,249,067	299,096	19,395	35,041	6,143	1,608,742
Hüdavendigar (Bursa)	474,114	74,927	58,921	4,125	4,140	616,227
Konya	750,712	25,071	12,971	4	550	789,308
Ankara	877,285	20,226	44,507	1,026	10,773	953,817
Trabzon	921,128	161,574	37,549	8	2,688	1,122,947
Sivas	939,735	75,324	143,406	344	10,634	1,169,443
Kastamonu	737,302	20,958	8,959	8	0	767,227
Adana	341,903	8,537	50,139	66	10,378	411,023
Biga (Kale-i Sultaniye)	149,903	8,541	2,474	3,642	1,255	165,815

Greek Prime Minister Venizelos stated to a British newspaper that "Greece is not making war against Islam, but against the anachronistic Ottoman Government, and its corrupt, ignominious, and bloody administration, with a view to expelling it from those territories where the majority of the population consists of Greeks."

To an extent, the above danger may have been overstated by Venizelos as a negotiating card on the table of Sèvres, in order to gain the support of the Allied governments. For example, the Young Turks were not in power at the time of the war, which makes such a justification less straightforward. Most of the leaders of that regime had fled the country at the end of World War I and the Ottoman government in Constantinople was already under British control. Furthermore, Venizelos had already revealed his desires for annexation of territories from the Ottoman Empire in the early stages of World War I, before these massacres had taken place. In a letter sent to Greek King Constantine in January 1915, he wrote that: "I have the impression that the concessions to Greece in Asia Minor ... would be so extensive that another equally large and not less rich Greece will be added to the doubled Greece which emerged from the victorious Balkan wars."

Through its failure, the Greek invasion may have instead exacerbated the atrocities that it was supposed to prevent. Arnold J. Toynbee blamed the policies pursued by Great Britain and Greece, and the decisions of the Paris Peace conference as factors leading to the atrocities committed by both sides during and after the war: "The Greeks of 'Pontus' and the Turks of the Greek occupied territories, were in some degree victims of Mr. Venizelos's and Mr. Lloyd George's original miscalculations at Paris."

=== Greek irredentism ===
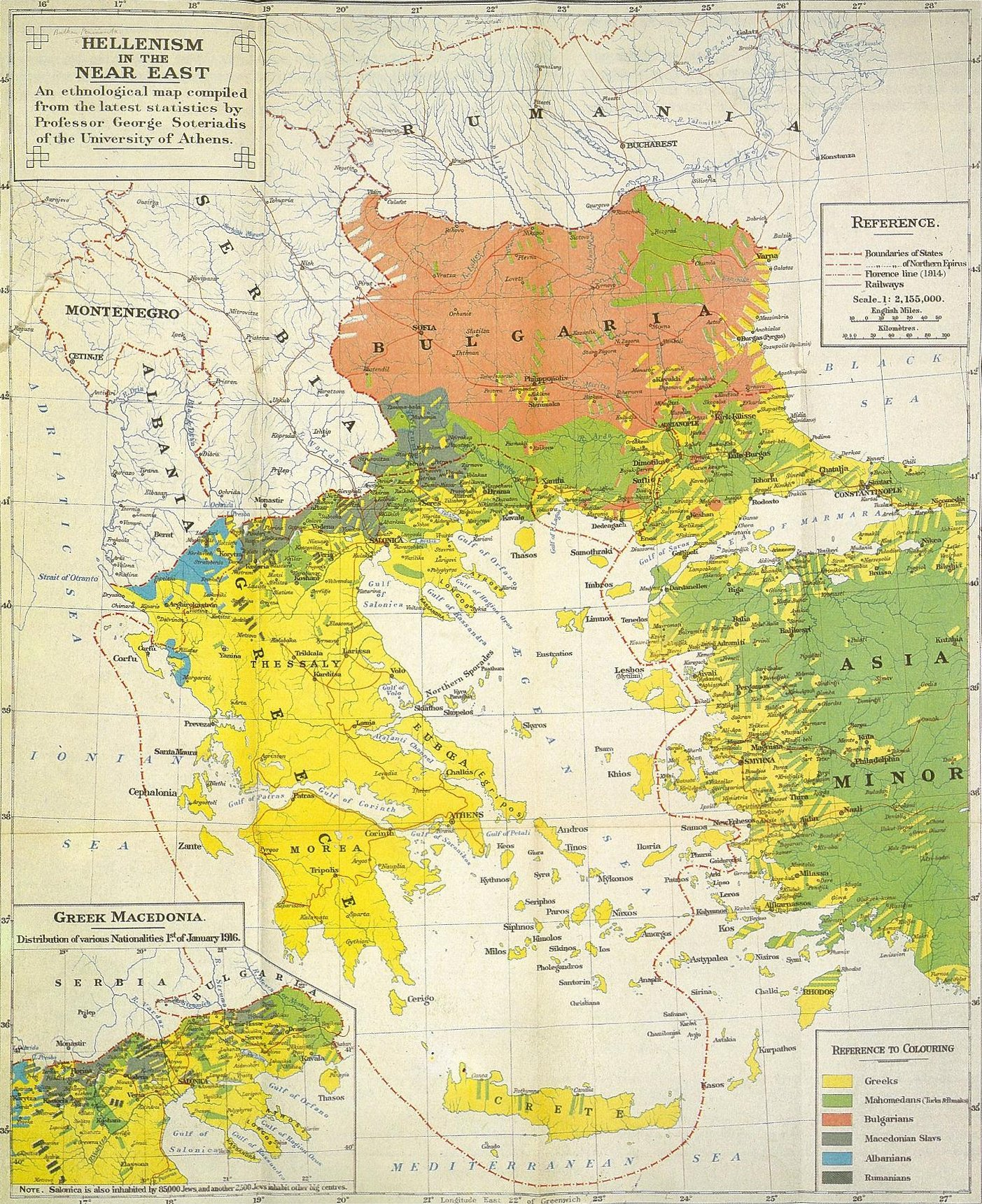
The Greek Kingdom and the Greek diaspora in the Balkans and western Asia Minor, according to a 1919 Greek map submitted to the Paris Peace Conference

One of the main motivations for initiating the war was to realize the Megali (Great) Idea, a core concept of Greek nationalism. The Megali Idea was an irredentist vision of a restoration of a Greater Greece on both sides of the Aegean that would incorporate territories with Greek populations outside the borders of the Kingdom of Greece, which was initially very small – roughly half the size of the present-day Greek Republic. From the time of Greek independence from the Ottoman Empire in 1830, the Megali Idea had played a major role in Greek politics. Greek politicians, since the independence of the Greek state, had made several speeches on the issue of the "historic inevitability of the expansion of the Greek Kingdom." For instance, Greek politician Ioannis Kolettis voiced this conviction in the assembly in 1844: "There are two great centres of Hellenism. Athens is the capital of the Kingdom. Constantinople is the great capital, the City, the dream and hope of all Greeks."

The Great Idea was not merely the product of 19th century nationalism. It was, in one of its aspects, deeply rooted in many Greeks' religious consciousness. This aspect was the recovery of Constantinople for Christendom and the reestablishment of the Christian Byzantine Empire which had fallen in 1453. "Ever since this time the recovery of St. Sophia and the City had been handed down from generation to generation as the destiny and aspiration of the Greek Orthodox." The Megali Idea, besides Constantinople, included most traditional lands of the Greeks including Crete, Thessaly, Epirus, Macedonia, Thrace, the Aegean Islands, Cyprus, the coastlands of Asia Minor and Pontus on the Black Sea. Asia Minor was an essential part of the Greek world and an area of enduring Greek cultural dominance. In antiquity, from late Bronze Age up to the Roman conquest, Greek city-states had even exercised political control of most of the region, except the period ca. 550–470 BC when it was part of the Achaimenid Persian Empire. Later, during Middle Ages, the region had belonged to the Byzantine Empire until the 12th century, when the first Seljuk Turk raids reached it.

=== The National Schism in Greece ===
The National Schism in Greece was the deep split of Greek politics and society between two factions, the one led by Eleftherios Venizelos and the other by King Constantine, that predated World War I but escalated significantly over the decision on which side Greece should support during the war.

The United Kingdom had hoped that strategic considerations might persuade Constantine to join the cause of the Allies, but the King and his supporters insisted on strict neutrality, especially whilst the outcome of the conflict was hard to predict. In addition, family ties and emotional attachments made it difficult for Constantine to decide which side to support during World War I. The King's dilemma was further increased when the Ottomans and the Bulgarians, both having grievances and aspirations against the Greek Kingdom, joined the Central Powers.

Though Constantine did remain decidedly neutral, Prime Minister of Greece Eleftherios Venizelos had from an early point decided that Greece's interests would be best served by joining the Entente and started diplomatic efforts with the Allies to prepare the ground for concessions following an eventual victory. The disagreement and the subsequent dismissal of Venizelos by the King resulted in a deep personal rift between the two, which spilled over into their followers and the wider Greek society. Greece became divided into two radically opposed political camps, as Venizelos set up a separate state in Northern Greece, and eventually, with Allied support, forced the King to abdicate. In May 1917, after the exile of Constantine, Venizélos returned to Athens and allied with the Entente. Greek military forces (though divided between supporters of the monarchy and supporters of "Venizelism") began to take part in military operations against the Bulgarian Army on the border.

The act of entering the war and the preceding events resulted in a deep political and social division in post–World War I Greece. The country's foremost political formations, the Venizelist Liberals and the Royalists, already involved in a long and bitter rivalry over pre-war politics, reached a state of outright hatred towards each other. Both parties viewed the other's actions during the First World War as politically illegitimate and treasonous. This enmity inevitably spread throughout Greek society, creating a deep rift that contributed decisively to the failed Asia Minor campaign and resulted in much social unrest in the inter-war years.

== History ==
=== Greek expansion ===
Map of the military developments until August 1922

The military aspect of the war began with the Armistice of Mudros. The military operations of the Greco-Turkish war can be roughly divided into three main phases: the first phase, spanning the period from May 1919 to October 1920, encompassed the Greek Landings in Asia Minor and their consolidation along the Aegean Coast. The second phase lasted from October 1920 to August 1921, and was characterised by Greek offensive operations. The third and final phase lasted until August 1922, when the strategic initiative was held by the Turkish Army.

==== Landing at Smyrna (May 1919) ====
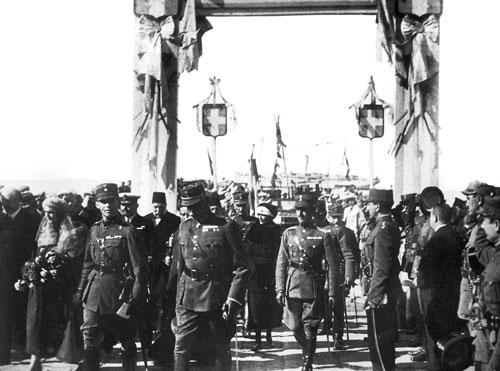
Arrival of Crown Prince George in Smyrna, 1919

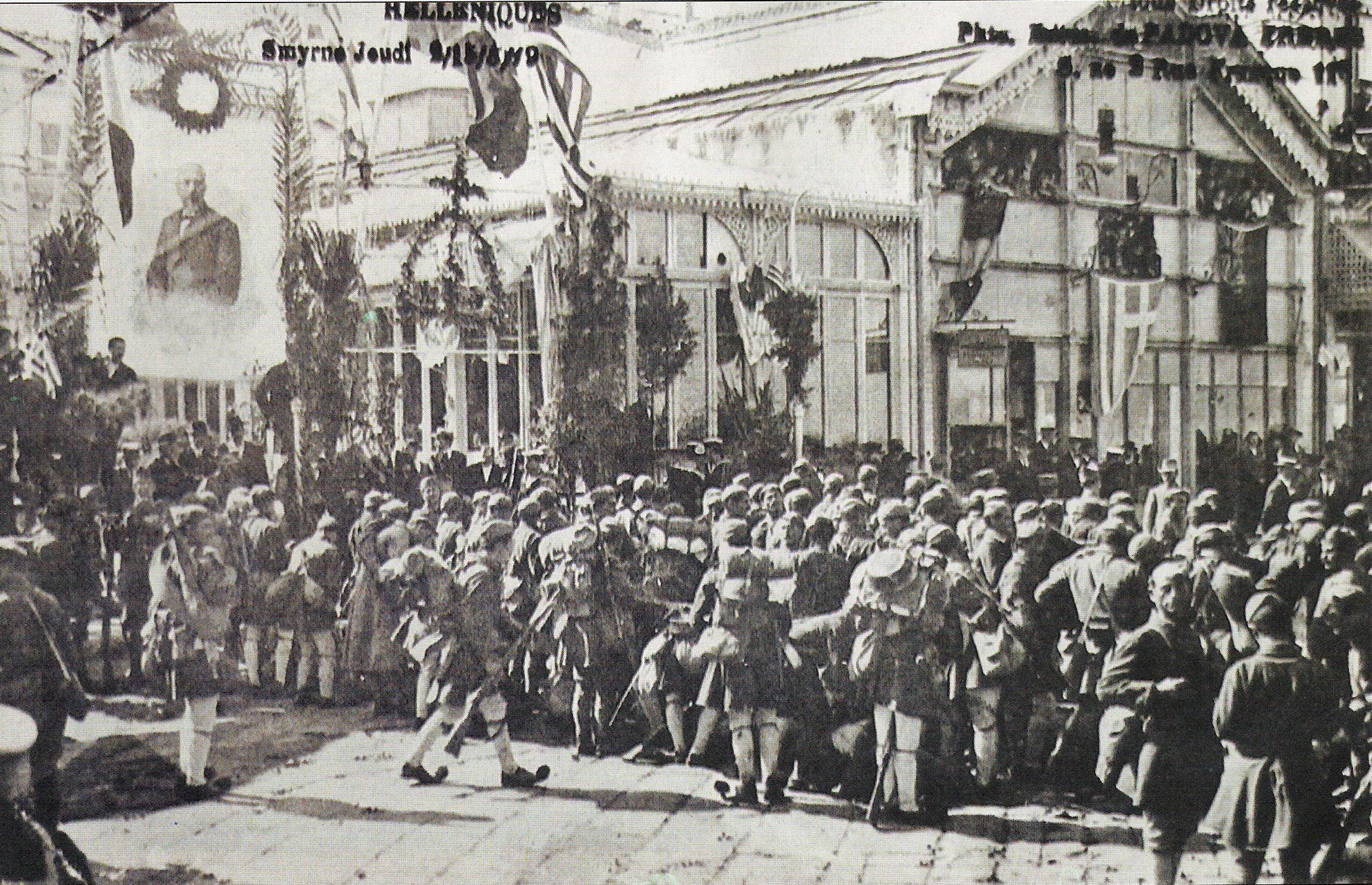
Greek soldiers taking their posts in Smyrna (İzmir) amidst the jubilant ethnic Greek population of the city, 15 May 1919

On 15 May 1919, twenty thousand Greek soldiers landed in Smyrna and took control of the city and its surroundings under cover of the Greek, French, and British navies. Legal justifications for the landings were found in Article 7 of the Armistice of Mudros, which allowed the Allies "to occupy any strategic points in the event of any situation arising which threatens the security of Allies." The Greeks had already brought their forces into Eastern Thrace (apart from Constantinople and its region).

The Christian population of Smyrna (mainly Greeks and Armenians), according to different sources, was either almost as much or greater than the Muslim Turkish population of the city. The Greek army included 2,500 Armenian volunteers. The majority of the Greek population residing in the city greeted the Greek troops as liberators.

==== Foreign volunteers in the Greek Army ====
Ali Sami Bey, a former Ottoman naval officer who fought for Greece, leading a militia and attaining the rank of colonel

Greece officially banned non-Greek foreign volunteers in its armies in 1914. 7,265 Pontic Greek, Anatolian Greek, Cypriot Greek, Caucasian Greek and other diaspora Greek individuals enlisted. They were mostly unmarried men in their 20s. 17 non-Greek volunteers also made it into the ranks of the Hellenic Army by exploiting loopholes.

In September 1920, the former British Army officer Vincent Anderson applied to volunteer, but was rejected by Athanasios N. Miaoulis. In May 1921, former Ottoman captain Osman Bey also volunteered himself to join the Greek Army but he, too, was rejected. In August 1922, Ricciotti Garibaldi, seeing the direness of the situation, offered himself and his Garibaldini to Greece, just as he did in the First Greco-Turkish War in 1897 and in the Balkan Wars in 1912 and 1913; the Montenegrin Serb Marco Bogdanovitch also offered his services in June. Fearing diplomatic rows, especially from Italy, Greece rejected both of their offers on 10 September 1922. However, the number of foreign volunteers skyrocketed into 621 after the 11 September 1922 Revolution in Greece. The vast majority of those non-Greek volunteers who enlisted between 1919 and 1922 were Armenians, but there were also numbers of French, Bulgarians, Serbs, Romanians, Albanians, Syrians, Egyptians, Circassians, Georgians and even Ottomans. A few Russian White Guardists also volunteered for the Greek Army, considering Greece an ally against the Soviets who were "with the Turks". One of those Russians, in particular, sought to fight for the creation of a Pontic state.

Circassians supporting Greece, in particular, were thousands, but they were not counted officially; estimates vary, but they might have numbered up to 20,000 in total. In February 1923, they also created the "Circassian Volunteer Corps of Mytilene", in order to support Greece if an attack on Thrace by Turkey happened. There were also around 2,500 extra Armenian volunteers on the Greek side under General Torkom.

==== Greek summer offensives (Summer 1920) ====
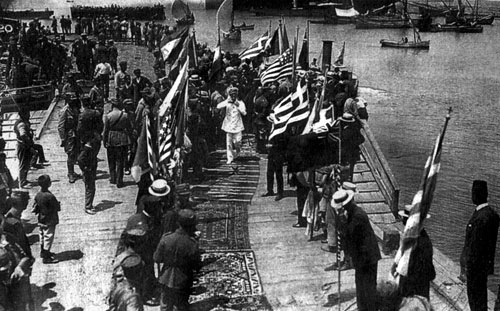
Greek and American troops landing at Bandirma, July 1920

During the summer of 1920, the Greek army launched a series of successful offensives in the directions of the Büyük Menderes River (Meander) Valley, Bursa (Prusa) and Alaşehir (Philadelphia). The overall strategic objective of these operations, which were met by increasingly stiff Turkish resistance, was to provide strategic depth to the defence of Smyrna. To that end, the Greek zone of occupation was extended over all of Western and most of North-Western Anatolia.

==== Treaty of Sèvres (August 1920) ====
Partition of the Ottoman Empire according to the Treaty of Sèvres

In return for the contribution of the Greek army on the side of the Allies, the Allies supported the assignment of eastern Thrace and the millet of Smyrna to Greece. This treaty ended the First World War in Asia Minor and, at the same time, sealed the fate of the Ottoman Empire. Henceforth, the Ottoman Empire would no longer be a European power.

On 10 August 1920, the Ottoman Empire signed the Treaty of Sèvres ceding to Greece Thrace, up to the Chatalja lines. More importantly, Turkey renounced to Greece all rights over Imbros and Tenedos, retaining the small territories of Constantinople, the islands of Marmara, and "a tiny strip of European territory". The Straits of Bosporus were placed under an International Commission, as they were now open to all.

Turkey was furthermore forced to transfer to Greece "the exercise of her rights of sovereignty" over Smyrna in addition to "a considerable Hinterland, merely retaining a 'flag over an outer fort'." Though Greece administered the Smyrna enclave, its sovereignty remained, nominally, with the Sultan. According to the provisions of the Treaty, Smyrna was to maintain a local parliament and, if within five years time she asked to be incorporated within the Kingdom of Greece, the provision was made that the League of Nations would hold a plebiscite to decide on such matters.

The treaty was never ratified by the Ottoman Empire nor Greece.

==== Greek advance (October 1920) ====
In October 1920, the Greek army advanced further east into Anatolia, with the encouragement of Lloyd George, who intended to increase pressure on the Turkish and Ottoman governments to sign the Treaty of Sèvres. This advance began under the Liberal government of Eleftherios Venizelos, but soon after the offensive began, Venizelos fell from power and was replaced by Dimitrios Gounaris. The strategic objective of these operations was to defeat the Turkish Nationalists and force Mustafa Kemal into peace negotiations. The advancing Greeks, still holding superiority in numbers and modern equipment at this point, had hoped for an early battle in which they were confident of breaking up the ill-equipped Turkish forces. Yet they met with little resistance, as the Turks managed to retreat in an orderly fashion and avoid encirclement. Churchill said: "The Greek columns trailed along the country roads passing safely through many ugly defiles, and at their approach the Turks, under strong and sagacious leadership, vanished into the recesses of Anatolia."

==== Change in Greek government (November 1920) ====
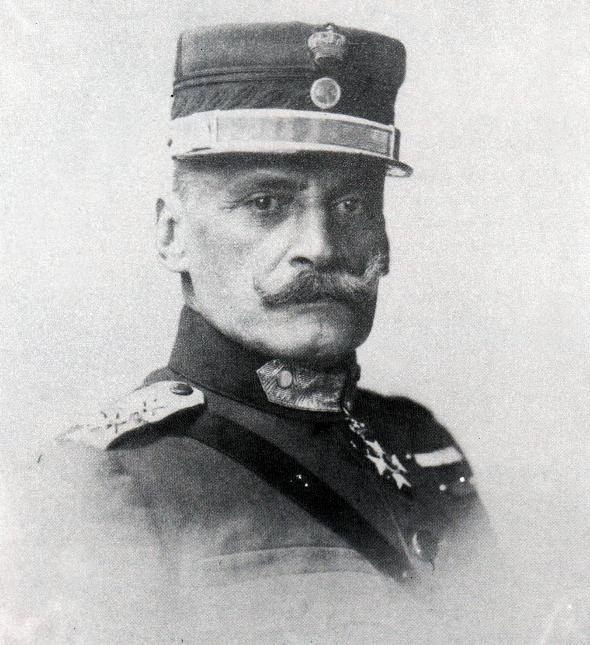
Anastasios Papoulas, new commander-in-chief of the Greek Army of Asia Minor

During October 1920, King Alexander, who had been installed on the Greek throne on 11 June 1917 when his father Constantine was pushed into exile by the Venizelists, was bitten by a monkey kept at the Royal Gardens and died within days from sepsis. After King Alexander died without heirs, the legislative elections scheduled to be held on 1 November 1920, suddenly became the focus of a new conflict between the supporters of Venizelos and the Royalists. The anti-Venizelist faction campaigned on the basis of accusations of internal mismanagement and authoritarian attitudes of the government, which, due to the war, had stayed in power without elections since 1915. At the same time they promoted the idea of disengagement in Asia Minor, without though presenting a clear plan as to how this would happen. On the contrary, Venizelos was identified with the continuation of a war that did not seem to go anywhere. The majority of the Greek people were both war-weary and tired of the almost dictatorial regime of the Venizelists, so opted for change. To the surprise of many, Venizelos won only 118 out of the total 369 seats. The crushing defeat obliged Venizelos and a number of his closest supporters to leave the country. To this day his rationale to call elections at that time is questioned.

The new government under Dimitrios Gounaris prepared for a plebiscite on the return of King Constantine.

A month later a plebiscite called for the return of King Constantine. Soon after his return, the King replaced many of the World War I Venizelist officers and appointed inexperienced monarchist officers to senior positions. The leadership of the campaign was given to Anastasios Papoulas, while King Constantine himself assumed nominally the overall command. The High Commissioner in Smyrna, Aristeidis Stergiadis, however was not removed.

The British and French governments promised the Greeks 850 million gold franks, but because of the government change in Greece, and heavy losses in Cilicia, the French government stopped supporting the Greeks until a small period between the Battle of Kütahya-Eskişehir and the end of the Battle of the Sakarya. The British government were also uneasy, but they preferred to wait. The Greeks, afraid of losing the support of the British, did not remove some Venizelist officers, and Britain continued to promise 850 million gold franks.

==== Gediz Offensive ====
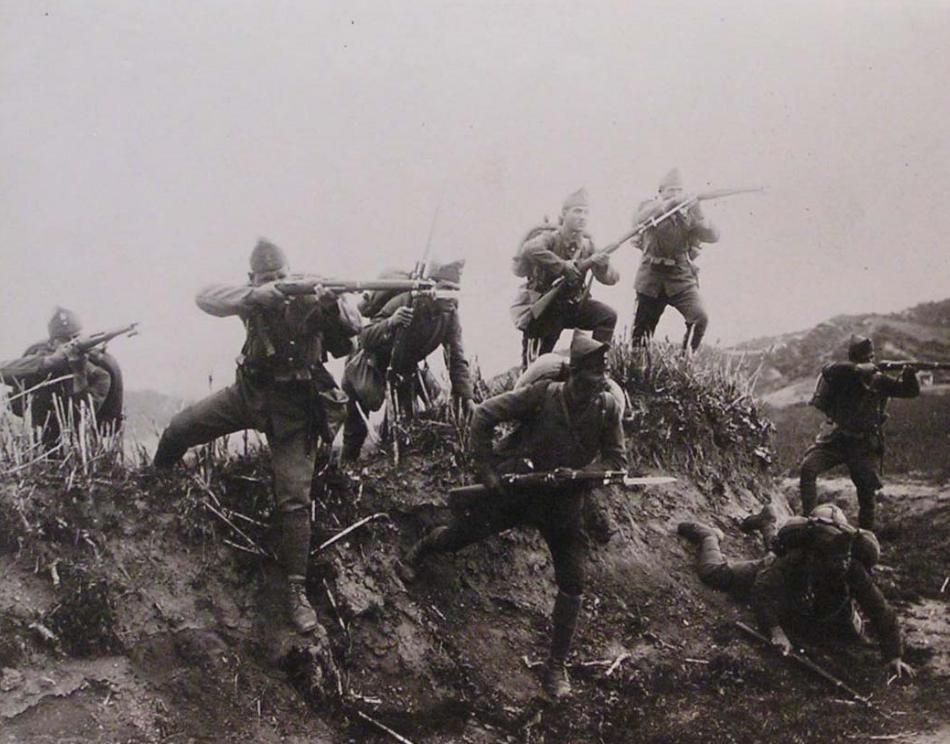
Greek soldiers charging against Turks in Gediz river

After the summer offensive of 1920, the Turkish irregular forces attacked the Greek Army which is under the command of Constantinos Matenas. Even though the offensive was successful, the opportunity of sieging and destroying the 13th Infantry Division of Greece (the division had nearly 15,000 men) was gone because of the arbitrary behaviours of the Kuva-yi Seyyare under the command of the Çerkes Ethem. Because of these events, the Grand National Assembly of the Turkish Nationalists started to create a regular force. The regular forces were going to lose the Battle of Kütahya-Eskişehir only against the Greek Armed Forces.

==== Battles of İnönü and Aslıhanlar–Dumlupınar (December 1920 – April 1921) ====
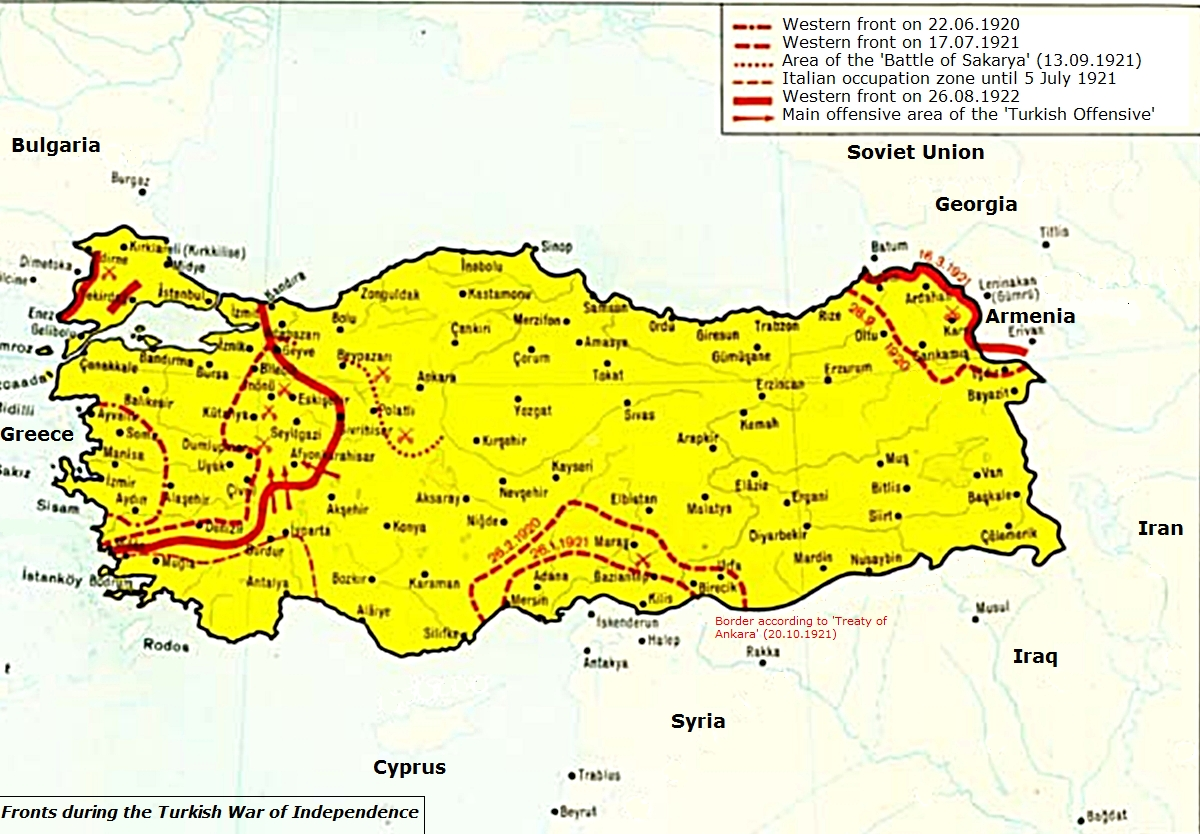
Map showing the advance of the Greek army on the western front

By December 1920, the Greeks had advanced on two fronts, approaching Eskişehir from the North West and from Smyrna, and had consolidated their occupation zone. In early 1921 they resumed their advance with small scale reconnaissance incursions that met stiff resistance from entrenched Turkish Nationalists, who were increasingly better prepared and equipped as a regular army.

The Greek advance was halted for the first time at the First Battle of İnönü on 11 January 1921. Even though this was a minor confrontation involving only one Greek division, it held political significance for the fledgling Turkish revolutionaries. This development led to Allied proposals to amend the Treaty of Sèvres at a conference in London where both the Turkish Revolutionary and Ottoman governments were represented.

Although some agreements were reached with Italy, France and Britain, the decisions were not agreed to by the Greek government, who believed that they still retained the strategic advantage and could yet negotiate from a stronger position. The Greeks initiated another attack on 27 March, the Second Battle of İnönü, where the Turkish troops fiercely resisted and finally halted the Greeks on 30 March. The British government supported Greeks with 6in howitzer during Second Battle of İnönü. The Turkish forces received arms assistance from Soviet Russia. In the Battle of Aslıhanlar–Dumlupınar, the Greeks successfully repelled a Turkish offensive.

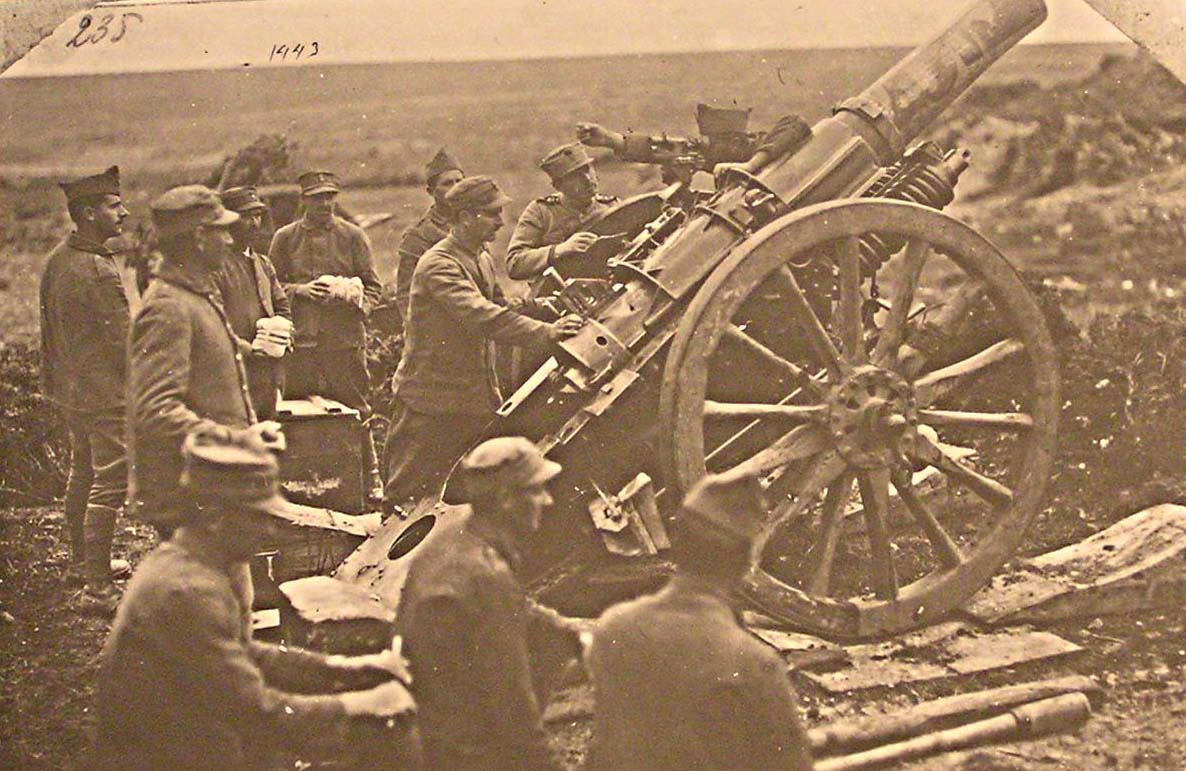
The British-made BL 6-inch 30 cwt howitzer is in the service of the Greeks during Second Battle of İnönü.

==== Shift of support towards the Turkish national movement ====
By this time all other fronts had been settled in favour of the Turks, freeing more resources for the main threat of the Greek Army. France and Italy concluded private agreements with the Turkish revolutionaries in recognition of their mounting strength. They viewed Greece as a British client, and sold military equipment to the Turks. The new Bolshevik government of Russia became friendly to the Turkish revolutionaries, as shown in the Treaty of Moscow (1921). The Bolsheviks supported Mustafa Kemal and his forces with money and ammunition. In 1920 alone, Bolshevik Russia supplied the Kemalists with 6,000 rifles, over 5 million rifle cartridges, and 17,600 shells as well as 200.6 kg (442.2 lb) of gold bullion. In the subsequent two years the amount of aid increased.

==== Battle of Afyonkarahisar–Eskişehir (July 1921) ====
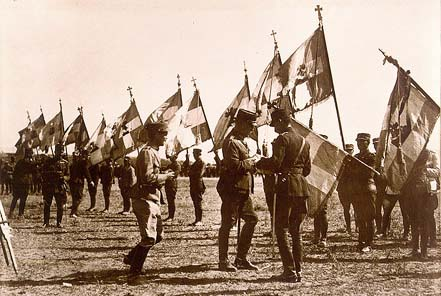
King Constantine decorating the victorious war flags outside Kütahya, 1921

Between 27 June and 20 July 1921, a reinforced Greek army of nine divisions launched a major offensive, the greatest thus far, against the Turkish troops commanded by İsmet İnönü on the line of Afyonkarahisar-Kütahya-Eskişehir. The plan of the Greeks was to cut Anatolia in two, as the above towns were on the main rail-lines connecting the hinterland with the coast. Eventually, after breaking the stiff Turkish defences, they occupied these strategically important centres. Instead of pursuing and decisively crippling the nationalists' military capacity, the Greek Army halted. In consequence, and despite their defeat, the Turks managed to avoid encirclement and made a strategic retreat on the east of the Sakarya River, where they organised their last line of defence.

This was the major decision that sealed the fate of the Greek campaign in Anatolia. The state and Army leadership, including King Constantine, Prime Minister Dimitrios Gounaris, and General Anastasios Papoulas, met at Kütahya where they debated the future of the campaign. The Greeks, with their faltering morale rejuvenated, failed to appraise the strategic situation that favoured the defending side; instead, pressed for a 'final solution', the leadership was polarised into the risky decision to pursue the Turks and attack their last line of defence close to Ankara. The military leadership was cautious and asked for more reinforcements and time to prepare, but did not go against the politicians. Only a few voices supported a defensive stance, including Ioannis Metaxas. Constantine by this time had little actual power and did not argue either way. After a delay of almost a month that gave time to the Turks to organise their defence, seven of the Greek divisions crossed east of the Sakarya River.

==== Battle of Sakarya (August and September 1921) ====
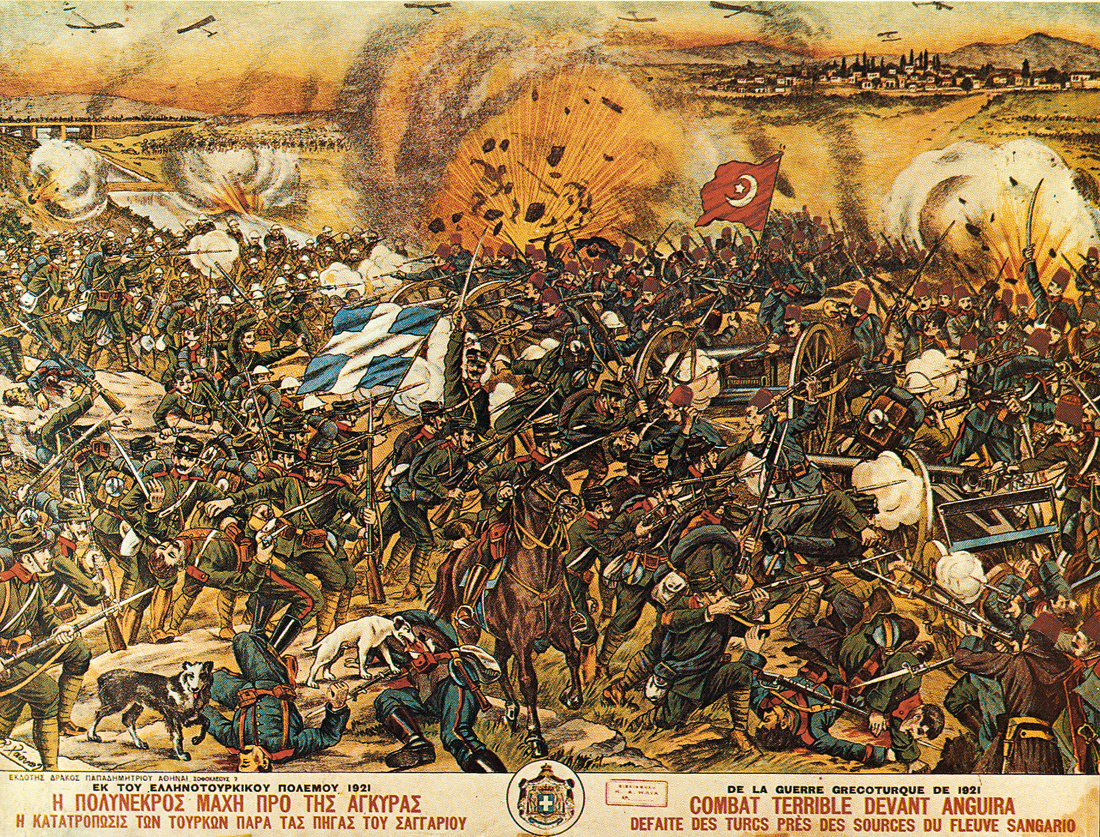
Greek lithograph depicting the Battle of Sakarya

Following the retreat of the Turkish troops under İsmet İnönü in the battle of Kütahya-Eskişehir the Greek Army advanced afresh to the Sakarya River (Sangarios in Greek), less than 100 kilometres (62 mi) west of Ankara. Constantine's battle cry was "to Angira" and the British officers were invited, in anticipation, to a victory dinner in the city of Kemal. It was envisaged that the Turkish Revolutionaries, who had consistently avoided encirclement would be drawn into battle in defence of their capital and destroyed in a battle of attrition.

Despite the Soviet help, supplies were short as the Turkish army prepared to meet the Greeks. As such, the Tekâlif-i Milliye was launched. Owners of private rifles, guns and ammunition had to surrender them to the army and every household was required to provide a pair of underclothing and sandals. Meanwhile, the Turkish parliament, not happy with the performance of İsmet İnönü as the Commander of the Western Front, wanted Mustafa Kemal and Chief of General Staff Fevzi Çakmak to take control.

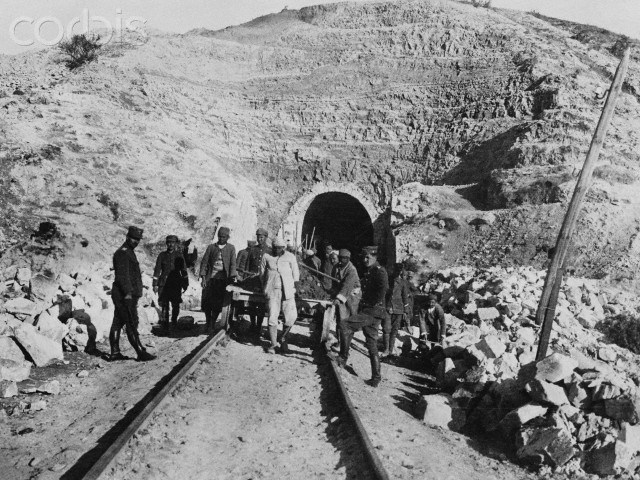
Turkish prisoners at work in a POW camp, August 1921

Greek forces marched 200 kilometres (120 mi) for a week through the desert to reach attack positions, so the Turks could see them coming. Food supplies were 40 tons of bread and salt, sugar and tea, the rest to be found on the way.

The advance of the Greek Army faced fierce resistance which culminated in the 21-day Battle of Sakarya (23 August – 13 September 1921). The Turkish defense positions were centred on series of heights, and the Greeks had to storm and occupy them. The Turks held certain hilltops and lost others, while some were lost and recaptured several times over. Yet the Turks had to conserve men, for the Greeks held the numerical advantage. The crucial moment came when the Greek army tried to take Haymana, 40 kilometres (25 mi) south of Ankara, but the Turks held out. Greek advances into Anatolia had lengthened their lines of supply and communication and they were running out of ammunition. The ferocity of the battle exhausted both sides but the Greeks were the first to withdraw to their previous lines. The thunder of cannon was plainly heard in Ankara throughout the battle.

That was the furthest in Anatolia the Greeks would advance, and within a few weeks they withdrew in an orderly manner back to the lines that they had held in June. The Turkish Parliament awarded both Mustafa Kemal and Fevzi Çakmak with the title of Field Marshal for their service in this battle. To this day no other person has received this five-star general title from the Turkish Republic.

==== Stalemate (September 1921 – August 1922) ====
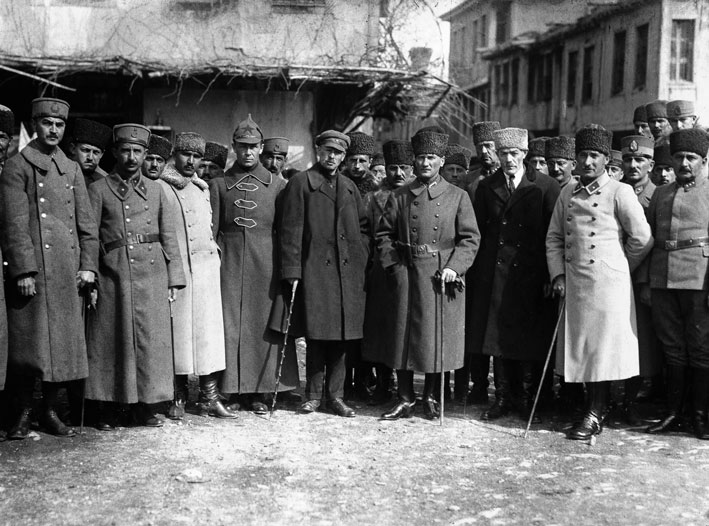
Mustafa Kemal's visit to Çay. From left to right: chief of staff of the Western Front Miralay Asim Bey (Gündüz), commander of the Western Front Mirliva Ismet Pasha (İnönü), unknown, military attaché of the Soviet Russia K.K. Zvonarev, ambassador of Soviet Russia S.I. Aralov, Mustafa Kemal Pasha, ambassador of Azerbaijan SSR Ibrahim Abilov, commander of First Army Mirliva Ali Ihsan Pasha (Sâbis), in the morning of 31 March 1922.

Having failed to reach a military solution, Greece appealed to the Allies for help, but early in 1922 Britain, France and Italy decided that the Treaty of Sèvres could not be enforced and had to be revised. In accordance with this decision, under successive treaties, the Italian and French troops evacuated their positions, leaving the Greeks exposed.

In March 1922, the Allies proposed an armistice. Feeling that he now held the strategic advantage, Mustafa Kemal declined any settlement while the Greeks remained in Anatolia and intensified his efforts to re-organise the Turkish military for the final offensive against the Greeks. At the same time, the Greeks strengthened their defensive positions, but were increasingly demoralised by the inactivity of remaining on the defensive and the prolongation of the war. The Greek government was desperate to get some military support from the British or at least secure a loan, so it developed a plan to force the British diplomatically, by threatening their positions in Constantinople, but this never materialised. The occupation of Constantinople would have been an easy task at this time because the Allied troops garrisoned there were much fewer than the Greek forces in Thrace (two divisions). The result though was instead to weaken the Greek defences in Smyrna by withdrawing troops. The Turkish forces, on the other hand, were recipients of significant assistance from Soviet Russia. On 29 April, the Soviet authorities supplied the Turkish consul critical quantities of arms and ammunition, sufficient for three Turkish divisions. On 3 May, the Soviet government handed over 33,500,000 gold rubles to Turkey – the balance of the credit of 10,000,000 gold rubles.

Voices in Greece increasingly called for withdrawal, and demoralizing propaganda spread among the troops. Some of the removed Venizelist officers organised a movement of "National Defense" and planned a coup to secede from Athens, but never gained Venizelos's endorsement and all their actions remained fruitless.

Historian Malcolm Yapp wrote that:

After the failure of the March negotiations the obvious course of action for the Greeks was to withdraw to defensible lines around İzmir but at this point fantasy began to direct Greek policy, the Greeks stayed in their positions and planned a seizure of Constantinople, although this latter project was abandoned in July in the face of Allied opposition.

=== Turkish counter-attack ===
==== Dumlupınar ====
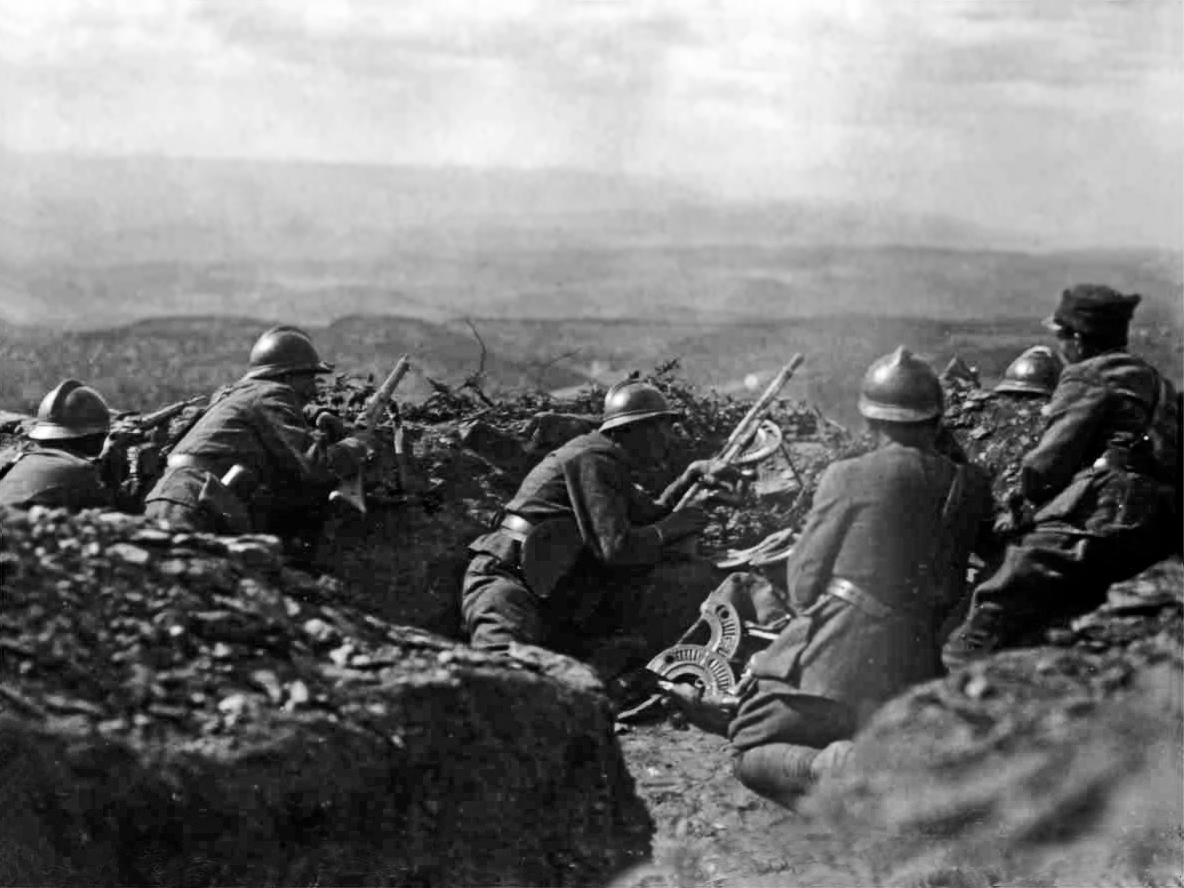
Greek soldiers near Afyonkarahisar on 29 August 1922

The Turks launched a counter-attack on 26 August, what has come to be known to the Turks as the "Great Offensive" (Büyük Taarruz). The major Greek defense positions were overrun on 26 August, and Afyon fell next day. On 30 August, the Greek army was defeated decisively at the Battle of Dumlupınar, with many of its soldiers captured or killed and a large part of its equipment lost. This date is celebrated as Victory Day, a national holiday in Turkey and salvage day of Kütahya. During the battle, the Greek generals Nikolaos Trikoupis and Kimon Digenis were captured by the Turkish forces. General Trikoupis learned only after his capture that he had been recently appointed Commander-in-Chief in General Hatzianestis' place. According to the Greek Army General Staff, major generals Nikolaos Trikoupis and Kimon Digenis surrendered on 30 August 1922 by the village of Karaja Hissar due to lack of ammunition, food and supplies. On 1 September, Mustafa Kemal issued his famous order to the Turkish army: "Armies, your first goal is the Mediterranean, Forward!" After the defeat of the Greek army in Dumlupınar, Greek soldiers pursued a "scorched earth" policy while retreating.

==== Turkish advance on Smyrna ====
On 2 September, Eskişehir was captured and the Greek government asked Britain to arrange a truce that would at least preserve its rule in Smyrna. However Mustafa Kemal Atatürk had categorically refused to acknowledge even a temporary Greek occupation of Smyrna, calling it a foreign occupation, and pursued an aggressive military policy instead. Balıkesir and Bilecik were taken on 6 September, and Aydın the next day. Manisa was taken on 8 September. The government in Athens resigned. During the Greek retreat and Turkish pursuit, civilians suffered atrocities from retreating troops, local Christian mobs, and the pursuing Turkish cavalry, leaving the road from Uşak to Smyrna littered with corpses. Turkish cavalry entered Smyrna on 9 September. Gemlik and Mudanya fell on 11 September, with an entire Greek division surrendering. The expulsion of the Greek Army from Anatolia was completed on 18 September. As historian George Lenczowski has put it: "Once started, the offensive was a dazzling success. Within two weeks the Turks drove the Greek army back to the Mediterranean Sea."

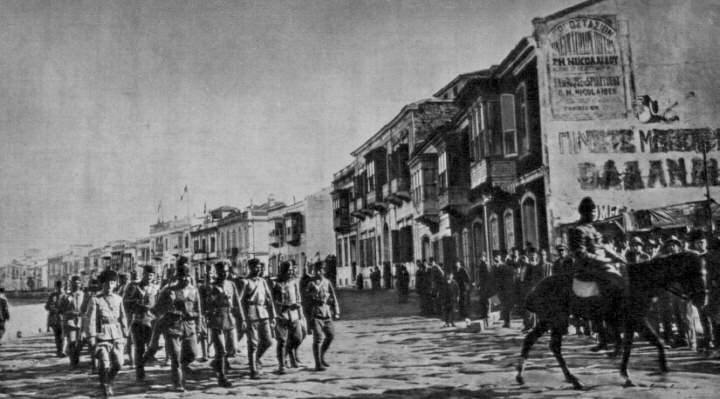
Entry of the Turkish army commanded by Mustafa Kemal Pasha to Smyrna (İzmir) on September 9, 1922

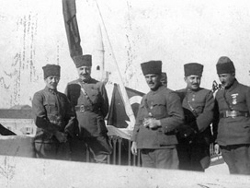
Turkish Military Commanders at the seat of the Governor of İzmir on the morning of September 10, 1922

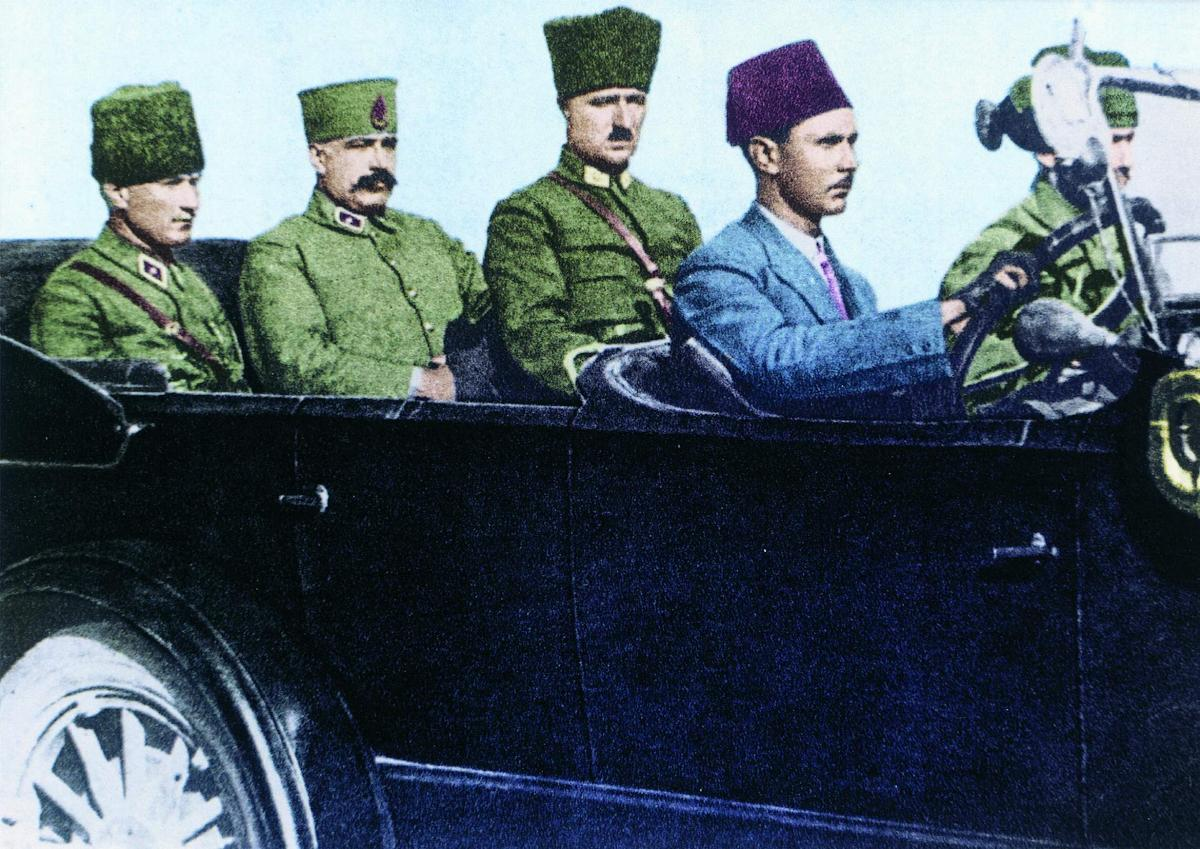
Commander-in-chief Mushir Mustafa Kemal Pasha arrives in İzmir with Mushir Fevzi Pasha and Aide-de-camp Major Salih Bey on September 10, 1922.

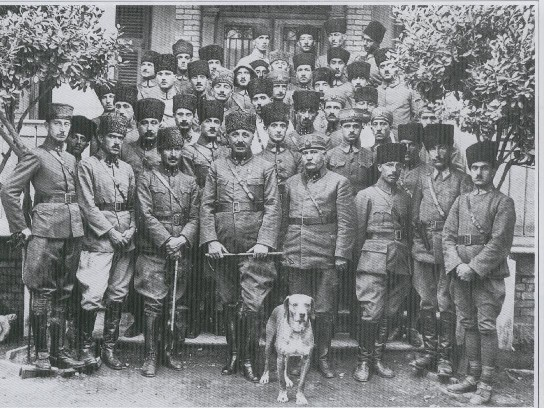
Mirliva Fahrettin Pasha on his first visit to İzmir with Turkish commanders

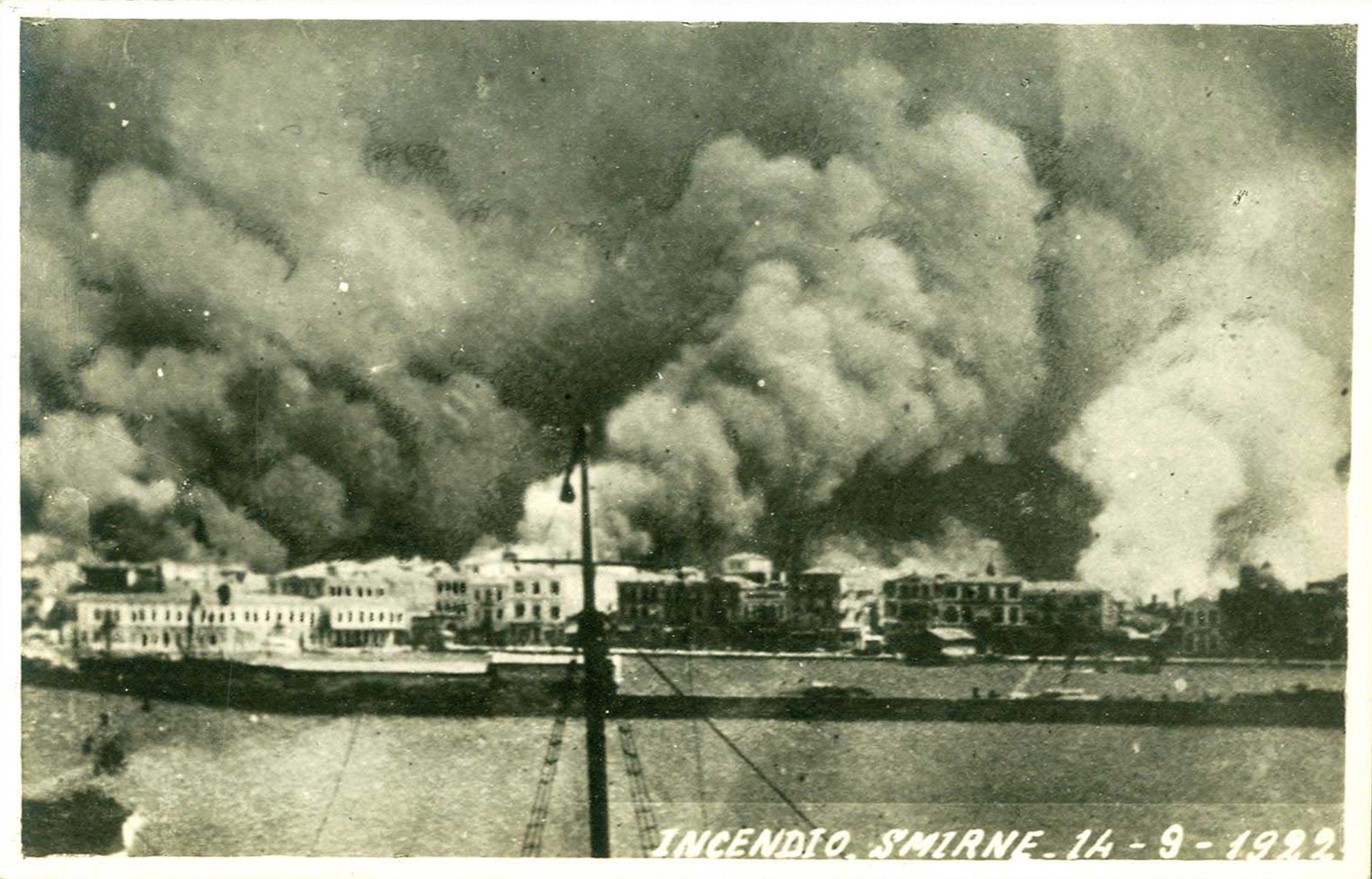
The Burning of Smyrna as seen from an Italian ship, 14 September 1922

The vanguards of Turkish cavalry entered the outskirts of Smyrna on 9 September. On the same day, the Greek headquarters had evacuated the town. The Turkish cavalry rode into the town around eleven o'clock on the Saturday morning of 9 September. On 10 September, with the possibility of social disorder, Mustafa Kemal was quick to issue a proclamation, sentencing to death any Turkish soldier who harmed non-combatants. A few days before the Turkish capture of the city, Mustafa Kemal's messengers distributed leaflets with this order written in Greek. Mustafa Kemal said that the Ankara government would not be held responsible for any occurrence of a massacre.

On 13 September, the Greek and Armenian quarters of the city were burned, while the Turkish as well as Jewish quarters were unharmed. Atrocities were committed against Greek and Armenian populaces, and their properties were pillaged. Most of the eye-witness reports identified troops from the Turkish army having set fire to the city.

The only continuing campaign for the Turks outside the Western Front was an operation over Northern Iraq.

==== Chanak Crisis ====
After re-capturing Smyrna, Turkish forces headed north for the Bosporus, the sea of Marmara, and the Dardanelles where the Allied garrisons were reinforced by British, French and Italian troops from Constantinople. In an interview with George Ward Price published in the Daily Mail, 15 September, Mustafa Kemal stated that: "Our demands remain the same after our recent victory as they were before. We ask for Asia Minor, Thrace up to the river Maritsa and Constantinople... We must have our capital and I should in that case be obliged to march on Constantinople with my army, which will be an affair of only a few days. I must prefer to obtain possession by negotiation though, naturally I cannot wait indefinitely."

Around this time, several Turkish officers were sent to infiltrate secretly into Constantinople to help organize Turkish population living in the city in the event of a war. For instance, Ernest Hemingway, who was at the time a war correspondent for the newspaper Toronto Star, reported that:

"Another night a [British] destroyer... stopped a boatload of Turkish women who were crossing from Asia Minor...On being searched for arms it turned out all the women were men. They were all armed and later proved to be Kemalist officers sent over to organize the Turkish population in the suburbs in case of an attack on Constantinople"

The British cabinet initially decided to resist the Turks if necessary at the Dardanelles and to ask for French and Italian help to enable the Greeks to remain in eastern Thrace. The British government also issued a request for military support from its Dominions. The response from the Dominions was negative (with the exception of New Zealand). Italian and French forces abandoned their positions at the straits and left the British alone to face the Turks.

On 24 September, Mustafa Kemal's troops moved into the straits zones and refused British requests to leave. The British cabinet was divided on the matter but eventually any possible armed conflict was prevented. British General Charles Harington, allied commander in Constantinople, kept his men from firing on Turks and warned the British cabinet against any rash adventure. The Greek fleet left Constantinople upon his request. The British finally decided to force the Greeks to withdraw behind the Maritsa in Thrace. This convinced Mustafa Kemal to accept the opening of armistice talks.

=== Resolution ===
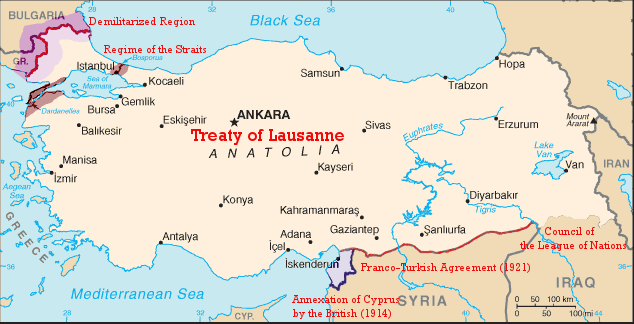
Map of Turkey with its western borders as specified by the Treaty of Lausanne

The Armistice of Mudanya was concluded on 11 October 1922. The Allies (Britain, France and Italy) retained control of eastern Thrace and the Bosporus. The Greeks were to evacuate these areas. The agreement came into force starting 15 October 1922, one day after the Greek side agreed to sign it.

The Armistice of Mudanya was followed by the Treaty of Lausanne. Separate from this treaty, Turkey and Greece came to an agreement covering an exchange of populations. Over one million Greek Orthodox Christians were displaced; most of them were resettled in Attica and the newly incorporated Greek territories of Macedonia and Thrace and were exchanged with about 500,000 Muslims displaced from Greek territories.

==== Factors contributing to the outcome ====
The Greeks estimated, despite warnings from the French and British not to underestimate the enemy, that they would need only three months to defeat the already weakened Turks on their own. Exhausted from four years of bloodshed, no Allied power had the will to engage in a new war and relied on Greece. During the Conference of London in February 1921, the Greek prime minister Kalogeropoulos revealed that the morale of the Greek army was excellent and their courage was undoubted, he added that in his eyes the Kemalists were "not regular soldiers; they merely constituted a rabble worthy of little or no consideration". Still, the Allies had doubts about Greek military capacity to advance in Anatolia, facing vast territories, long lines of communication, financial shortcomings of the Greek treasury and above all the toughness of the Turkish peasant/soldier. After the Greek failure to rout and defeat the new established Turkish army in the First and Second Battle of İnönü the Italians began to evacuate their occupation zone in southwestern Anatolia in July 1921. Furthermore, the Italians also claimed that Greece had violated the limits of the Greek occupation laid down by the Council of Four. France, on the other hand, had its own front in Cilicia with the Turkish nationalists. The French, like the other Allied powers, had changed their support to the Turks in order to build a strong buffer state against the Bolsheviks after October 1921 and were looking to leave. After the Greeks had failed again to knock out the Turks in the decisive Battle of Sakarya, the French finally signed the Treaty of Ankara (1921) with the Turks in late October 1921. The Allied forces, who came to Black Sea in 1919, were forced to leave by Turkish forces by 1920. After that, suppressing the Pontic rebels proved easier for the Turkish 15th division. The Greek Navy bombarded some larger ports (June and July 1921 Inebolu; July 1921 Trabzon, Sinop; August 1921 Rize, Trabzon; September 1921 Araklı, Terme, Trabzon; October 1921 Izmit; June 1922 Samsun). The Greek Navy was able to blockade the Black Sea coast especially prior and during the First and Second İnönü, Kütahya–Eskişehir and Sakarya battles, preventing weapon and ammunition shipments.

Having adequate supplies was a constant problem for the Greek Army. Although it was not lacking in men, courage or enthusiasm, it was soon lacking in nearly everything else. Due to her poor economy, Greece could not sustain long-term mobilisation. According to a British report from May 1922, 60,000 Anatolian Greeks, Armenians and Circassians served under arms in the Greek occupation (of this number, 6,000–10,000 were Circassians). In comparison, the Turks also had difficulties to find enough fit men, as a result of 1.5 million military casualties during World War I. Very soon, the Greek Army exceeded the limits of its logistical structure and had no way of retaining such a large territory under constant attack by initially irregular and later regular Turkish troops. The idea that such large force could sustain offensive by mainly "living off the land" proved wrong. Although the Greek Army had to retain a large territory after September 1921, the Greek Army was more motorized than the Turkish Army. The Greek Army had in addition to 63,000 animals for transportation, 4,036 trucks and 1,776 automobiles/ambulances, (according to the Greek Army History Directorate total number of trucks, including ambulances, was 2500). Only 840 of them have been used for the advance to Angora, also 1.600 camels and a great number of ox and horse carts, whereas the Turkish Army relied on transportation with animals. They had 67,000 animals (of whom were used as: 3,141 horse carts, 1,970 ox carts, 2,318 tumbrels and 71 phaetons), but only 198 trucks and 33 automobiles/ambulances.

As the supply situation worsened for the Greeks, things improved for the Turks. After the Armistice of Mudros, the Allies had dissolved the Ottoman army, confiscated all Ottoman weapons and ammunition, hence the Turkish National Movement which was in the progress of establishing a new army, was in desperate need of weapons. In addition to the weapons not yet confiscated by the Allies, they enjoyed Soviet support from abroad. The Soviets also provided monetary aid to the Turkish National Movement, not to the extent that they promised but almost in sufficient amount to make up the large deficiencies in the promised supply of arms. One of the main reasons for Soviet support was that Allied forces were fighting on Russian soil against the Bolshevik regime, therefore the Turkish opposition was much favored by Moscow.

A British military attaché, who inspected the Greek Army in June 1921, was quoted as saying, "[It is a] more efficient fighting machine than I have ever seen it." Later he wrote: "The Greek Army of Asia Minor, which now stood ready and eager to advance, was the most formidable force the nation had ever put into field. Its morale was high. Judged by Balkan standards, its staff was capable, its discipline and organization good." Turkish troops had a determined and competent strategic and tactical command, manned by World War I veterans. The Turkish army enjoyed the advantage of being in defence, executed in the new form of 'area defence'.

Mustafa Kemal presented himself as revolutionary to the communists, protector of tradition and order to the conservatives, patriot soldier to the nationalists, and a Muslim leader for the religious, so he was able to recruit all Turkish elements and motivate them to fight. The Turkish National Movement attracted sympathizers especially from the Muslims of the far east countries. The Khilafet Committee in Bombay started a fund to help the Turkish National struggle and sent both financial aid and constant letters of encouragement. Not all of the money arrived, and Mustafa Kemal decided not use the money that was sent by the Khilafet Committee. The money was restored in the Ottoman Bank. After the war, it was later used for the founding of the Türkiye İş Bankası.

== Atrocities and ethnic cleansing by both sides ==
=== Turkish genocides of Greeks and Armenians ===
Rudolph J. Rummel estimated that from 1900 to 1923, various Turkish regimes killed from 3,500,000 to over 4,300,000 Armenians, Greeks, and Assyrians. Rummel estimates that 440,000 Armenian civilians and 264,000 Greek civilians were killed by Turkish forces during the Turkish War of Independence between 1919 and 1922. However, he also gives the figures in his study of between 1.428 and 4.388 million dead of whom 2.781 millions were Armenian, Greek, Nestorians, Turks, Circassians and others, in line 488. British historian and journalist Arnold J. Toynbee stated that when he toured the region he saw numerous Greek villages that had been burned to the ground. Toynbee also stated that the Turkish troops had clearly, individually and deliberately, burned down each house in these villages, pouring petrol on them and taking care to ensure that they were totally destroyed. There were massacres throughout 1920–23, the period of the Turkish War of Independence, especially of Armenians in the East and the South, and against the Greeks in the Black Sea Region. Ultimately, by 1922, the majority of Ottoman Greeks of Anatolia had either become refugees or had died.

Greeks suffered in the Turkish labor battalions. Many of the Greek deportations involved chiefly women and children as, by early 1915, most army-age Greek men had been mobilized in Ottoman labor battalions or had fled their homes to avoid conscription. According to Rendel, atrocities such as deportations involving death marches, starvation in labour camps etc. were referred to as "white massacres". Ottoman official Rafet Bey was active in the genocide of the Greeks and in November 1916, Austrian consul in Samsun, Kwiatkowski, reported that he said to him "We must finish off the Greeks as we did with the Armenians ... today I sent squads to the interior to kill every Greek on sight". According to a French report in 1918:

The miserable men in the labor battalions are dispersed in different directions in the far ends of the Empire, from the shores of Asia Minor and the Black Sea to the Caucasus, Bagdad, Mesopotamia and Egypt; some of them to build military roads, others to dig the tunnels of Bagdad railway...I saw those wretched men in the hospitals of Konya, stretched upon their beds or on the ground, resembling living skeletons, longing for death to end their sufferings...To describe this disastrous situation I shall conclude that as a result of high level of mortality the cemetery of Konya is full of corpses of the soldiers serving in the labor battalions, and in each tomb there lie four, five or sometimes even six corpses just like dogs.

Sivas province governor Ebubekir Hâzım Tepeyran said in 1919 that the massacres were so horrible that he could not bear to report them. He referred to the atrocities committed against Greeks in the Black Sea region, and according to the official tally 11,181 Greeks were murdered in 1921 by the Central Army under the command of Nurettin Pasha (who is infamous for the killing of Archbishop Chrysostomos). Some parliamentary deputies demanded that Nurettin Pasha be sentenced to death and it was decided to put him on trial, although the trial was later revoked by the intervention of Mustafa Kemal. Taner Akçam wrote that according to one newspaper, Nurettin Pasha had proposed the killing of all the remaining Greek and Armenian populations in Anatolia, a suggestion rejected by Mustafa Kemal.

There were also several contemporary Western newspaper articles reporting the atrocities committed by Turkish forces against Christian populations living in Anatolia, mainly Greek and Armenian civilians. For instance, according to the London Times, "The Turkish authorities frankly state it is their deliberate intention to let all the Greeks die, and their actions support their statement." An Irish paper, the Belfast News Letter wrote, "The appalling tale of barbarity and cruelty now being practiced by the Angora Turks is part of a systematic policy of extermination of Christian minorities in Asia Minor." According to the Christian Science Monitor, the Turks felt that they needed to murder their Christian minorities due to Christian superiority in terms of industriousness and the consequent Turkish feelings of jealousy and inferiority. The paper wrote: "The result has been to breed feelings of alarm and jealousy in the minds of the Turks, which in later years have driven them to depression. They believe that they cannot compete with their Christian subjects in the arts of peace and that the Christians and Greeks especially are too industrious and too well educated as rivals. Therefore, from time to time they have striven to try and redress the balance by expulsion and massacre. That has been the position generations past in Turkey again if the Great powers are callous and unwise enough to attempt to perpetuate Turkish misrule over Christians." According to the newspaper the Scotsman, on 18 August 1920, in the Feival district of Karamusal, South-East of Ismid in Asia Minor, the Turks massacred 5,000 Christians. There were also massacres during this period against Armenians, continuing the policies of the 1915 Armenian Genocide according to some Western newspapers. On 25 February 1922, 24 Greek villages in the Pontus region were burnt to the ground. An American newspaper, the Atlanta Observer wrote: "The smell of the burning bodies of women and children in Pontus" said the message "comes as a warning of what is awaiting the Christian in Asia Minor after the withdrawal of the Hellenic army." In the first few months of 1922, 10,000 Greeks were killed by advancing Kemalist forces, according to Belfast News Letter. According to the Philadelphia Evening Bulletin the Turks continued the practice of slavery, seizing women and children for their harems and raping numerous women. The Christian Science Monitor wrote that Turkish authorities also prevented missionaries and humanitarian aid groups from assisting Greek civilians who had their homes burned, the Turkish authorities leaving these people to die despite abundant aid. The Christian Science Monitor wrote: "the Turks are trying to exterminate the Greek population with more vigor than they exercised towards the Armenians in 1915." German and Austro-Hungarian diplomats, as well as the 1922 memorandum compiled by British diplomat George W. Rendel on "Turkish Massacres and Persecutions", provided evidence for series of systematic massacres and ethnic cleansing of the Greeks in Asia Minor.

Henry Morgenthau, the United States ambassador to the Ottoman Empire from 1913 to 1916, accused the "Turkish government" of a campaign of "outrageous terrorizing, cruel torturing, driving of women into harems, debauchery of innocent girls, the sale of many of them at 80 cents each, the murdering of hundreds of thousands and the deportation to and starvation in the desert of other hundreds of thousands, [and] the destruction of hundreds of villages and many cities", all part of "the willful execution" of a "scheme to annihilate the Armenian, Greek and Syrian Christians of Turkey". However, months prior to the First World War, 100,000 Greeks were deported to Greek islands or the interior which Morgenthau stated, "for the larger part these were bona-fide deportations; that is, the Greek inhabitants were actually removed to new places and were not subjected to wholesale massacre. It was probably the reason that the civilized world did not protest against these deportations".

US Consul-General George Horton, whose account has been criticised by scholars as anti-Turkish, claimed, "One of the cleverest statements circulated by the Turkish propagandists is to the effect that the massacred Christians were as bad as their executioners, that it was '50–50'." On this issue he comments: "Had the Greeks, after the massacres in the Pontus and at Smyrna, massacred all the Turks in Greece, the record would have been 50–50 – almost." As an eye-witness, he also praises Greeks for their "conduct ... toward the thousands of Turks residing in Greece, while the ferocious massacres were going on", which, according to his opinion, was "one of the most inspiring and beautiful chapters in all that country's history".

Atrocities against Pontic Greeks living in the Pontus region is recognized in Greece and Cyprus as the Pontian Genocide. According to a proclamation made in 2002 by the then-governor of New York (where a sizeable population of Greek Americans resides), George Pataki, the Greeks of Asia Minor endured immeasurable cruelty during a Turkish government-sanctioned systematic campaign to displace them; destroying Greek towns and villages and slaughtering additional hundreds of thousands of civilians in areas where Greeks composed a majority, as on the Black Sea coast, Pontus, and areas around Smyrna; those who survived were exiled from Turkey and today they and their descendants live throughout the Greek diaspora.

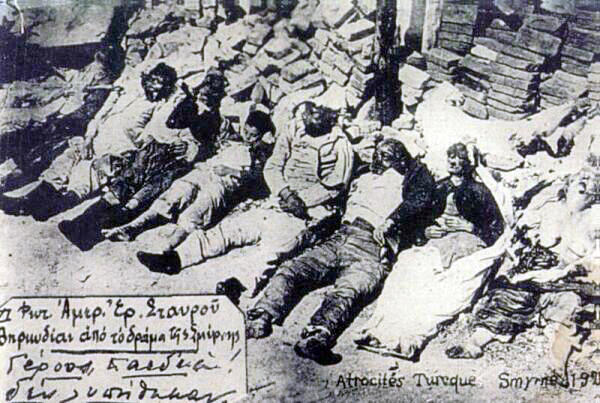
Greek victims of the Great Fire of Smyrna

By 9 September 1922, the Turkish army had entered Smyrna, with the Greek authorities having left two days before. Large scale disorder followed, with the Christian population suffering under attacks from soldiers and Turkish inhabitants. The Greek archbishop Chrysostomos had been lynched by a mob which included Turkish soldiers, and on 13 September, a fire from the Armenian quarter of the city had engulfed the Christian waterfront of the city, leaving the city devastated. The responsibility for the fire is a controversial issue; some sources blame Turks, and some sources blame Greeks or Armenians. Some 50,000 to 100,000 Greeks and Armenians were killed in the fire and accompanying massacres.

=== Greek massacres of Turks ===
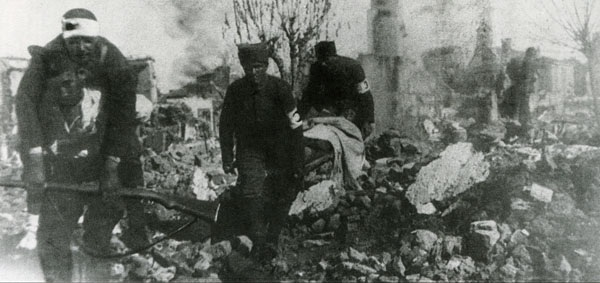
Turkish medics arrived at a town to rescue wounded on the way to İzmir after Greek forces abandoned the town (August 1922).

British historian Arnold J. Toynbee wrote that there were organized atrocities following the Greek landing at Smyrna on 15 May 1919. He also stated that he and his wife were witnesses to the atrocities perpetrated by Greeks in the Yalova, Gemlik, and Izmit areas and they not only obtained abundant material evidence in the shape of "burnt and plundered houses, recent corpses, and terror stricken survivors" but also witnessed robbery by Greek civilians and arson by Greek soldiers in uniform as they were being perpetrated. Toynbee wrote that as soon as the Greek Army landed, they started committing atrocities against Turkish civilians, as they "laid waste the fertile Maeander (Meander) Valley", and forced thousands of Turks to take refuge outside the borders of the areas controlled by the Greeks. Secretary of State for the Colonies and later Prime Minister of the United Kingdom, Winston Churchill comparing the specific activities with the genocide policies perpetrated by the Turkish side noted that the Greek atrocities were on "a minor scale" compared to the "appalling deportations of Greeks from the Trebizond and Samsun district."

During the Battle of Bergama, the Greek army committed a massacre against Turkish civilians in Menemen killing 200 and injuring 200 people. Some Turkish sources claim that the death count of the Menemen massacre was 1000. On 24 June 1921, a massacre occurred in İzmit, resulting in the death of more than 300 Turkish civilians according to Arnold J. Toynbee.

Elias Venezis, in his book Number 31328, states that the returning Greek Army belonging to the 4th regiment found around 40 dead Greek soldiers and commenced their "Retaliation Workshops". He mentions that a young Turkish child from Lesbos and a mother was also among the civilians massacred. The skull of the living people (Turks), were slowly cut with a saw. Arms were crushed with weights and eyes were gouged out with whatever tools the Greek soldiers had. He also adds that the Turks were huddled in the shack of the Workshop, watching and waiting in line. In later versions, this part was deleted and revised to only "There was a lot of retaliation then" These events are also mentioned by the mayor of Soma, Osman Nuri, in his telegraph dated 20 June 1919. He stated that more than 50 thousand Muslim refugees had arrived to his jurisdiction from the surroundings of Bergama, and that the Greek soldiers had committed atrocities that are much worse than even the atrocities committed in the Middle Ages. In these events, he adds that the Greek soldiers had turned their atrocities to civilians, which includes murder, rape, and pillaging of households into an amusement for themselves. A similar atrocity was witnessed by Lieutenant Ali Rıza Akıncı on the morning of 8 September 1922, in the railway station of Saruhanlı, which provoked his units to burn the Greek Soldiers in a nearby barn whom they had taken prisoners. He describes the atrocities with the following words: "Nine Turkish villagers were killed, the dead were manipulated to disgrace humanity as long as the world stood still, and nine dead people were turned into a ring by putting the finger of one to the ass of the other, the genitals of one to the mouth of the other."

Harold Armstrong, a British officer who was a member of the Inter-Allied Commission, reported that as the Greeks pushed out from Smyrna, they massacred and raped civilians, and burned and pillaged as they went. However, other British officials found no evidence for this claim.

Some testimonies exist of atrocities in Eastern Thrace. In one village the Greek army allegedly demanded 500 gold liras to spare the town; however, after payment, the village was still sacked. Robbery of Muslim civilians were also mentioned in the memories of a local Greek from Şile. There, the Greek non-commissioned officers, and the "Greek deserters", who had been appointed guards of his homeland, went to the villages to search for rifles. In the villages, they hunted for any rich Turk, and tortured them by hanging the victim upside down, and burning the grass underneath in order for them to reveal where they hid weapons. Then, a Greek from Şile would go and say to him, "Give me a hundred liras and we will save you". The same method of torture and killing is described in the report of Ziya Paşa, the last Ottoman Minister of War, regarding the atrocities in Eastern Thrace dating to 27 April 1921. The report stated that a Muslim woman in the village of Hamidiye, Uzunköprü was hanged upside down in a tree and was burned with the fire below her, while a cat was put inside her underwear in order to force her to confess the location of her husband's weapons. Moreover, the report included a similar example of the same atrocity done to Efrahim Ağa, the elder muhtar of Seymen in Silivri; only this time the victim was hanged straight and burned from his legs.

The Inter-Allied commission, consisting of British, French, American, and Italian, officers, (Note: General Hare, the British Delegate; General Bunoust, the French Delegate; General Dall'Olio, the Italian Delegate; Admiral Bristol, the American Delegate) and the representative of the Geneva International Red Cross, M. Gehri, prepared two separate collaborative reports on their investigations of the Gemlik-Yalova Peninsula Massacres. These reports found that Greek forces committed systematic atrocities against the Turkish inhabitants. The commissioners also mentioned the "burning and looting of Turkish villages", the "explosion of violence of Greeks and Armenians against the Turks", and "a systematic plan of destruction and extinction of the Moslem population". In their report dated 23 May 1921, the Inter-Allied commission stated that "This plan is being carried out by Greek and Armenian bands, which appear to operate under Greek instructions and sometimes even with the assistance of detachments of regular troops". The Inter-Allied commission also stated that the destruction of villages, and the disappearance of the Muslim population, might have been an objective to create in this region a political situation favourable to the Greek Government. The Allied investigation also pointed out that the specific events were reprisals for the general Turkish oppression of the past years and especially for the Turkish atrocities committed in the Marmara region one year before, when several Greek villages had been burned, and thousands of Greeks massacred. Arnold J. Toynbee wrote that they obtained convincing evidence that similar atrocities had been committed in wider areas all over the remainder of the Greek-occupied territories since June 1921. He argued that "the situation of the Turks in Smyrna City had become what could be called without exaggeration, a 'reign of terror'; it was to be inferred that their treatment in the country districts had grown worse in proportion."

In many cases, commanders of the Greek Army allowed and encouraged atrocities. Greek Soldier Hristos Karagiannis mentions in his diaries that in summer 1919, during and after the Battle of Aydın, Lieutenant Colonel Kondylis, who later became the Prime Minister of Greece, gave his soldiers "the right to do whatever our soul desires", and this led to some infantrymen committing atrocities. Atrocities were also mentioned in the telegraph of Nurullah Bey, the secretary of the Mutasarrıf of Aydın, dated 9 July 1919, to the State of Internal Affairs. In the telegraph, it is stated that the Greek Army, as well as the local Greek irregular bands, murdered innocent Muslims, including children, secretly and openly raped women, and burned the city down with the help of cannons. During the burning, they killed women and children who were fleeing from the fire with heavy machine guns, and that the ones who couldn't flee were burned to death. During the brief Liberation of Aydın (1919) by the Turkish National Force (Kuva-yi Milliye), the lives and properties of the local Greeks, even those who participated in the murders, were secured. After the return of the member of the national force, the Greek Army invaded Aydın once more (this time more vigorously), and "continued their brutality from where they had left off". Muslims who crossed into the direction of Çine and Denizli were massacred en masse, and prominent officials, including the Mutasarrıf, were arrested, and whether they were alive or not was unknown. Other examples where the Greek Commanders gave soldiers the freedom to commit all levels of atrocities include the events in and around Simav. Hristos Karagiannis in his memoirs mentions that his units' commander gave them the freedom "to do whatever their conscience and soul desires". The atrocities against the civilians had no limit, and were not sporadic, but were common and frequent in these areas. He adds the following about the state of the Turkish women and children: "The voices and cries of women and children do not stop day and night. The entire forest, and especially the more hidden parts, are full of people and clothing. Every woman, every child, and every impossible place is at the disposal of every Greek soldier.[...]They met as they say, entire families, many women, beautiful and ugly. Some were crying, others were mourning their husband, their honor." The campaign ended with the burning of every inhabited area, sometimes together with the elderly inhabitants. However no allied witnesses were present in the interior. These events around Demirci were also mentioned in the reports and the memoirs of İbrahim Ethem Akıncı, the commander of the Turkish Irregular "Demirci Akındjis" units and the Kaymakam of Demirci dating to 22 May 1921. The severity of the atrocities are mentioned with the following words: "A whole town was turned into ashes and many bad smells began to spread. [...] The streets could not be passed nor recognized. Many citizens lay martyred in every street. Some had only their feet, some had only one arm, some had only one head, and the other body parts had been burned black. Yarab (My God!), what is this view? [...] While we were wandering around, we came across even to some women who needed a witness to judge that they were human. They were raped by all the enemy soldiers and their feet and arms were broken, their whole bodies and faces were black, and they were sadly gone crazy. In the face of this tragedy, everyone (Akindjis) was sobbing and crying for revenge." The burning of the entirety of the town of Gördes by the Greek Occupation forces; 431 buildings, was also mentioned in the İsmet Paşa's referendum and Venizelos' reply did not contain a contrary statement to this claim.

However, the Allied report concluded that the Ismid peninsula atrocities committed by the Turks "have been considerable and more ferocious than those on the part of the Greeks". In general, as reported by a British intelligence report: "the [Turkish] inhabitants of the occupied zone have, in most cases, accepted the advent of Greek rule without demur, and in some cases, undoubtedly prefer it to the [Turkish] Nationalist regime which seems to have been founded on terrorism". British military personnel observed that the Greek army near Uşak was warmly welcomed by the Muslim population for "being freed from the license and oppression of the [Turkish] Nationalist troops"; there were "occasional cases of misconduct" by the Greek troops against the Muslim population, and the perpetrators were prosecuted by the Greek authorities, while the "worst miscreants" were "a handful of Armenians recruited by the Greek army", who were then sent back to Constantinople.

An eyewitness, a Greek Assistan Surgeon in the Greek Army, Petros Apostolidis from Ioannina who later became a prisoner of war in Uşak paint a completely different picture. In his memoirs he states that he will mention only 3 atrocities and will not mention the rest during the occupation with the following words: "Old men, women and children were locked in the mosque. Some soldiers of ours took them (to other Greek soldiers) the news, but being cowards as all lowlifes are, they did not dare, because of the crowd, to breach the door of the mosque and enter to rape its women, they gathered dry straw, threw it through the windows and set it on fire. As the smoke suffocated them, people started to come out of the door then these rascals (Greek soldiers) put the innocent women and children in the shooting range and killed quite a few. [...]They (Greek soldiers) hammered large nails into the floor, tied the women's braids to them to immobilize them, and gang-raped them." Moreover, he tells the story of a fellow doctor-officer Giannis Tzogias during their retreat, who did not stop two Greek soldiers from raping 2 Turkish girls out of fear nor shot nor reported them to their commander Trikoupis. The memoirs of Doctor Apostolidis regarding the state of Uşak and raping of Turkish girls are also verified in the official Ottoman documents from Uşak and from other Occupation zones. A report written by the Kaymakam of Balya, sent to the Ministry of Internal Affairs stated that Greek soldiers were raping girls even at the age of 10 and have done these rapings by locking the males of the villages (Aravacık, Hacı Hüseyin, Mancılık, Deliler and Haydaroba villages) in the mosques with the help of local Greeks who were informing the soldiers about the whereabouts of the beautiful girls and women. This report included the reports of the headmaster Mehmed Salih of the medrese of Uşak on his reports dating to 12th & 28 May 1922. There the headmaster states that hundreds of women and children as well as 28 notables of Uşak were taken prisoners to Athens, many people were tortured by being burned while hanging upside down, civilians were used as trench diggers, graves were desecrated and heads of the corpses were taken and were being played with by the local Greeks and Armenian children. Headmaster also states that Greek soldiers consisting of 25 men raped a beautiful Muslim girl aged 14 in the village of İslamköy in front of her parents eyes and afterwards she died and her parent have been bayoneted and that immediately a commission composed of unaligned countries should be sent there to witness the atrocities. Also, Şükrü Nail Soysal, a member of Parti Pehlivan's Platoon in his memoirs states that on 10 July 1921 his village, Ortaköy was looted and after being tortured, 40–50 males (including his brother Mehmet) were taken as prisoners and 30 were taken not to be seen again.

The behavior of Greek troops in Eastern Thrace was "exemplary". According to an American witness, when the Greek army marched into Bursa on July 8, the troops and Bursa Greeks displayed "perfectly wonderful self-control" toward the town's Turkish inhabitants, "especially when you think what they have to remember of wrongs done them and their families". Aristeidis Stergiadis, the high commissioner of Smyrna, tried to ease ethnic violence in the region. Stergiadis immediately punished the Greek soldiers responsible for violence on with court martial and created a commission to decide on payment for victims (made up of representatives from Great Britain, France, Italy and other allies). Stergiadis took a strict stance against discrimination of the Turkish population and opposed church leaders and the local Greek population on a number of occasions. Historians disagree about whether this was a genuine stance against discrimination, or whether it was an attempt to present a positive vision of the occupation to the allies. This stance against discrimination of the Turkish population often pitted Stergiadis against some segments of the Greek army. He reportedly would carry a stick through the town with which he would beat Greeks that were being abusive of Turkish citizens. Troops would sometimes disobey his orders to not abuse the Turkish population, putting him in conflict with the military. Venizelos continued to support Stergiadis despite some opposition.

Justin McCarthy reports that during the negotiations for the Treaty of Lausanne, the chief negotiator of the Turkish delegation, Ismet Pasha (İnönü), gave an estimate of 1.5 million Anatolian Muslims that had either been exiled or died in the areas of the Greek occupation zone. McCarthy lowers the estimate to 1,246,068 Muslim population loss between 1914 and 1922 in Anatolia, and arbitrarily ascribes 640,000 of those as occurring in both the Greek and British zones of operation in 1919–1922. McCarthy's work has faced harsh criticism by scholars who have characterized McCarthy's views as indefensibly biased towards Turkey and the Turkish official position as well as engaging in genocide denial. Other scholars, such as R.J. Rummel and Micheal Clodfelter give considerably lower estimates, stating at least 15,000 Turkish civilian deaths, but declining to give a maximum estimate.

As part of the Lausanne Treaty, Greece recognized the obligation to pay reparations for damages caused in Anatolia, though Turkey agreed to renounce all such claims due to Greece's difficult financial situation.

==== Greek scorched-earth policy ====
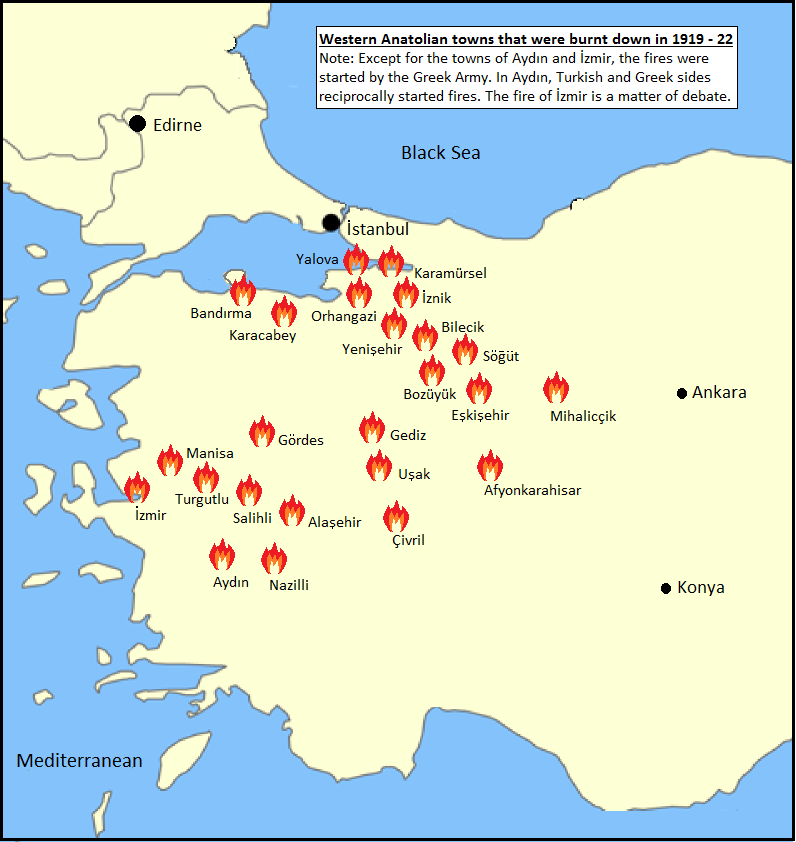
Western Anatolian towns that were burnt down in 1919 – 22 according to the report of the Turkish delegation in Lausanne

According to a number of sources, the retreating Greek army carried out a scorched-earth policy while fleeing from Anatolia during the final phase of the war. Historian of the Middle East, Sydney Nettleton Fisher wrote that: "The Greek army in retreat pursued a burned-earth policy and committed every known outrage against defenceless Turkish villagers in its path." Norman M. Naimark noted that "the Greek retreat was even more devastating for the local population than the occupation".

The Greek Army not only carried out a scorched-earth policy on its retreat, but also during its advance. This can be seen also in the diary of the Cretan Greek lieutenant Pantelis Priniotakis from Rethymno. In his diary dating to 13 July 1921, he states that his advancing unit, after a little resistance, captured and burned the town of Pazarcık in just a few hours, while some of its elder population were burned alive, while its population fled once they saw the advancing Greek Army.

The same lieutenant also states that the scorched-earth policy was conducted in the Greek Army's retreat after the Battle of Sakarya in his diary dating to 17 September 1921. The retreating units of the Greek Army were burning the villages on its path while the civilian Turkish population, whose villages were being burned, could not dare to confront the Greek Army. He also states that the burning happened while the grain was still on the fields, and sums up the atrocities committed by his fellow soldiers with the following words: "there was no lack of deviance and violence by our soldiers" The severity of the war crimes committed by the retreating troops were also mentioned by another officer of the Greek Army in Anatolia, Panagiotis Demestichas, who in his memoirs he writes the following: "The destruction in the cities and villages through which we passed, the arsons and other ugliness, I am not able to describe, and I prefer that the world remains oblivious to this destruction." Greek soldier Giannis Koutsonikolas explicitly stated that his units burned Afyonkarahisar and with it burned food, equipment and ammunition together with the city.

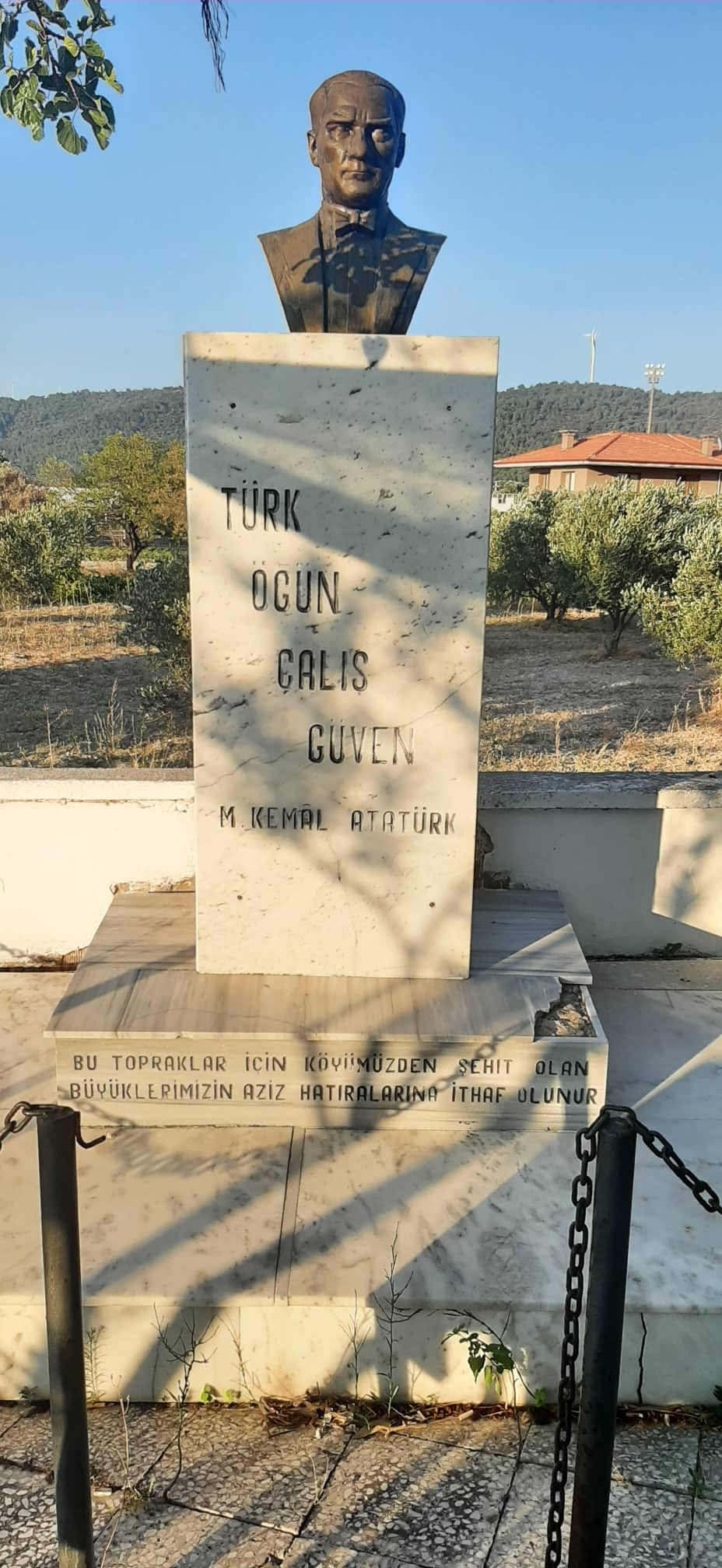
Zeytinler village in Urla, Memorial for the Civilians Casualties of the Village

Colonel Stylianos Gonatas, states in his memoirs "the rage of destruction and looting does not distinguish nationalities". He and his units were passing through Alaşehir while it was being burned from its one end to the other. While the city was being burned by the Greek Army, neither Turkish nor Greek quarters were spared from the burning. Moreover, he adds that the Greek Army looted both Greek houses, as well as Turkish ones. Gonatas also adds that every village in the plain east of Alaşehir was burned and that his troops could not find any living person nor anyone to take with them as a guide. He also states that Salihli and later Manisa was burned by the retreating Greeks while keeping the Turkish inhabitants inside the city. He also adds that the destruction of properties by the Greek Army included even the houses of the Greek soldiers from Turgutlu. He adds that those soldiers witnessed the burning of their own houses as well as the burning of the Turkish ones while the Turks were inside their burning houses "shooting desperately" killed a mounted retinue of the colonel. When Gonatas' units reached Urla, its local Greeks even formed a Militia unit to protect themselves from the retreating Greek Army and its civilian Greek and Irregular Armenian followers such as General Turkum's unit and Gonatas states that this was "a wise act of providence" by the Greeks of Urla. Turkish military archives also state that Army Corps of General Frangkou, which Colonel Gonatas was under also continued burning the villages of Urla on their path including its Greek villages. During the Burning of Smyrna these units were burning Zeytinler village and its surrounding villages in the west of Urla.

Johannes Kolmodin was a Swedish orientalist in Smyrna. He wrote in his letters that the Greek army had burned 250 Turkish villages.

The Greek writer Elias Venezis, in his book Number 31328, states that Kırkağaç was burned from the Armenian quarter by the "enemy" who left; although this book is a memoir, in later versions the word "enemy" was changed to "Greek". This claim is also verified in the Turkish Military archives. The units that have burned Kırkağaç continued its scorched earth policy and also burned Dikili on the night of 13–14 September while the Great Fire of Smyrna was ongoing. İsmet Paşa's referendum during the Lausanne negotiations stated that 13,599 buildings in the Sanjak of Smyrna, outside the city center was burned by the Greek Army. Venizelos' reply does not have a contrary statement to this claim

Greek soldier Vasilis Diamantopoulos, who in 1922 was stationed in Aydın and was captured when he and his units (18th Greek Infantry Regiment) reached the outskirts of İzmir on 10 September 1922, states that local Greeks and other Christians of Aydın started burning their own homes in the city before the official retreat, so that the Turks couldn't find them intact. Moreover, he adds that the efforts of the Greek soldiers to put the fire down were in vain.

Kinross wrote, "Already, most of the towns in its path were in ruins. One third of Ushak no longer existed. Alashehir was no more than a dark scorched cavity, defacing the hillside. Village after village had been reduced to an ash-heap. Out of the eighteen thousand buildings in the historic holy city of Manisa, only five hundred remained." The burning of Uşak is also mentioned in the military diary of Nikos Vasilikos, a Greek soldier and an enlisted student from the island of Thasos. He mentions the burning of the town and that all the surrounding villages were burned. He adds that the fire was so large that when they finished their march of "twelve continuous hours" and reached a village, the land was "illuminated with wild splendor by the flames". Moreover, he states that the Greek Army was burning the entirety of the cities and towns, and that neither mosques nor churches were saved. When he reached Kasaba, he mentioned the following: "We reach Kasaba, which is burning from end to end. The omnivorous fire licks with its fiery tongue indiscriminately the spiers of the Churches as well as the Minarets of the Mosques." According to the French diplomat Henry Franklin-Bouillon, during the fire of Manisa, out of 11,000 houses in the city, only 1,000 remained.

In one of the examples of the Greek atrocities during their Occupation, on 14 February 1922, in the Turkish village of Karatepe in Aydın Vilayeti, after being surrounded by the Greeks, all the inhabitants were put into the mosque, and the mosque was burned. The few who escaped the fire were shot. The Italian consul, M. Miazzi, reported that he had just visited a Turkish village where Greeks had slaughtered some sixty women and children. This report was then corroborated by Captain Kocher, the French consul.

==== Scorched earth against livestock ====
Greek scorched-earth policy also included mass slaughter of livestock. Stylianos Gonatas states that before embarking the ships in Çeşme on September 14–15, 1922, that the Greek Army ordered mass shooting of the horses and other animals and that this was the result of the egoistic recklessness of many men in the Greek Army. Moreover, the colonel states that this was done also by other units with the following words: "the divisions of the 2nd Army Corps that preceded us had abandoned a thousand cattle, their thirsty eyes and the absence of running water wandering mournfully around the wells, hoping to be watered." Fahrettin Altay, the general of the 5th Cavalry Sidearmy which were in the pursuit of the retreating Greek forces (General Frangou/Southern Group) in the peninsula saw those animals on the morning of 16 September. He states the following for the condition of the animals and the peninsula: "Greek soldiers escaping from Anatolia were able to escape as far as Çeşme with the horses they gathered from the villages. Their horses were also injured, bruised and skinny, some of them were scattered in the sea from hunger and thirst, and some of them were lying on the sand. Some of them were licking the damp stones on the dried fountain heads. Some of the poor animals were dead and some were about to die. We paused in the face of this heart-wrenching sight and collected and cared for those who could possibly be saved. We were also very saddened by the fact that the artillery carrier horses were killed by being tied to their feet with wires." Official documents from the Turkish military archives also state that around 500 battle animals were found dead and a thousand were saved and with all other animals from the peninsula were delivered to the animal depot near the Şirinyer Station by the 3rd Cavalry Division Ernest Hemingway who witnessed the Greek withdrawal from Edirne, Eastern Thrace after arriving to Constantinople on 30 September 1922 also states that the local Greek civilians were using a similar method of killing with the following words: "The Greeks were nice chaps too. When they evacuated they had all their baggage animals they couldn't take off with them so they just broke their forelegs and dumped them into the shallow water. All those mules with their forelegs broken pushed over into the shallow water. It was all a pleasant business. My word yes a most pleasant business." Greek soldiers such as Giannis Koutsonikolas from Arahova state that his units killed their own artillery animals when they were surrounded on all sides during the Great Offensive. On January 20, 1923, during Lausanne Negotiations, İsmet Paşa's referendum about Greek devastations in Anatolia stated that 134,040 Horses, 63,926 Donkeys and Mules were killed or removed and the total amount of all animals including sheep, goats, cows, camels, oxen and buffaloes killed or removed were 3,291,335. This figure and the memorandum are only regarding animals in the Greek Occupation areas in Western Anatolia, the destruction of property and animals in Eastern Thrace is not included in this memorandum. Venizelos' reply on the same day did not include a contrary statement to the destruction of animals. The Greek Independent Division, also left in Dikili, 3000 sheep, 1000 horses, steers and mules and killed some animals which were found by the 2nd Turkish Cavalry and 14th Turkish Infantry Divisions.

=== Population exchange ===
According to the population exchange treaty signed by both the Turkish and Greek governments, Greek orthodox citizens of Turkey and Turkish and Greek Muslim citizens residing in Greece were subjected to the population exchange between these two countries. Approximately 1,500,000 Orthodox Christians, being ethnic Greeks and ethnic Turks from Turkey and about 500,000 Turks and Greek Muslims from Greece were uprooted from their homelands. M. Norman Naimark claimed that this treaty was the last part of an ethnic cleansing campaign to create an ethnically pure homeland for the Turks Historian Dinah Shelton similarly wrote that "the Lausanne Treaty completed the forcible transfer of the country's Greeks."

A large part of the Greek population was forced to leave their ancestral homelands of Ionia, Pontus and Eastern Thrace between 1914 and 1922. These refugees, as well as Greek Americans with origins in Anatolia, were not allowed to return to their homelands after the signing of the Treaty of Lausanne.

== See also ==
- Outline and timeline of the Greek genocide
- List of massacres during the Greco-Turkish War (1919–1922)
- Chronology of the Turkish War of Independence
- Occupation of Smyrna
- Relief Committee for Greeks of Asia Minor
- Asia Minor Defense Organization
- Persecution of Muslims during the Ottoman contraction § Turkish War of Independence
