= Parti Pehlivan =

Turkish wrestler and guerrilla leader (c. 1870 – 1941)

Parti Pehlivan after the Surname Law Mehmet Baskak (1868/1872, Serres – August 6, 1941, Manisa) was a Turkish wrestler and a guerrilla leader in the Ottoman Empire of Bosniak decent, and an officer in the Turkish Army during World War I and the Turkish War of Independence. He was an important leader in Kuva-yi Milliye of the Aegean Region. After the declaration of the Turkish Republic he was granted land in Hacıhaliller, Manisa for his services and lived in Manisa until his death.

== Early years ==
Mehmet was born in the village of Ebdimal (Sisamia) in the Nahiye of Nigrita, southwest of Serres in Ottoman Greece. His father's name is Süleyman Pehlivan and his mother's name is Kaya. At an early age, he became a Pehlivan like his father, which is a common sport in his native town. Being a remarkable wrestler, he received the title "parti" which means that he was always wrestling with the winner of the tournaments. According to his descendants, he killed a local Greek and went up to the Mountains of Macedonia. During the long years of Macedonian Struggle he was in the mountains fighting against Bulgarian Komitadjis and Greek Makedonomachoi, but occasionally he banded with Christians against the oppressive rule of Abdulhamid II.

Being a member of the Serez branch of the Committee of Union and Progress he joined the Hareket Army to and suppressed the 31 March Uprising, where Mustafa Kemal was also in the same army.

== World War I ==
He fought in the Iraqi theater of the war. He was an officer in the battle of Kut against the British Commonwealth forces and Arab irregulars. After the war, he returned to Manisa as the Chief Guardian of the city Prison.

== Fighting for independence ==
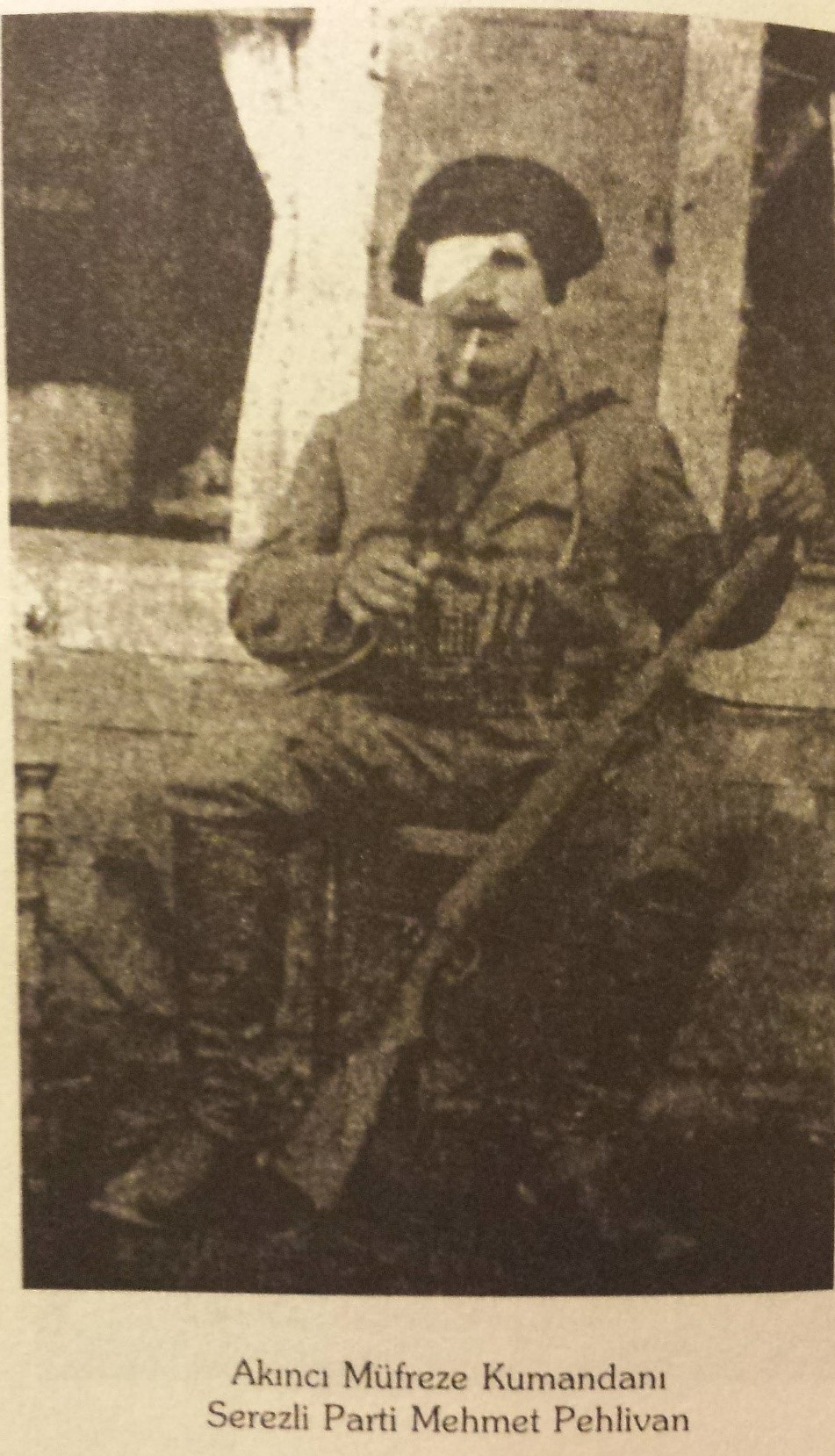
Parti Pehlivan on September 9, 1922

After the Greek Army set foot on Izmir on May 15, 1919, he gathered all the captives in the prison of Manisa and formed his guerilla band participated in the Ambush of Bergama and retreated east of the Milne Line.

After the congress of Alaşehir he with his gang "çete" fought against the Greek Army with Çerkes Ethem. He participated in suppressing many internal rebellions, such as the Revolt of Ahmet Anzavur and the revolt by the caliphate supporters by Kuva-yi Inzibatiye.

Lieutenant Ali Rıza Akıncı, the first Turkish officer to hoist the Turkish flag in the Liberation of Izmir on the 9th of September, in his memoirs mentions that he had a skirmish with Pehlivan's units before his realization of Ethem's betrayal, Ali Rıza describes Parti Pehlivan as "this emotional and patriot son of a Bosniak" and mentions that after learning the deceit and betrayal of Çerkez Ethem he said to his soldiers: "I do not lay down arms to the Infidels, take your platoon and surrender to the Muslims".

After learning the betrayal of Çerkes Ethem he broke ties with him and surrendered to the Turkish National Army stating that he was not part of the betrayal. On January 1, 1921, he wrote a letter to İsmet Paşa the commander of Western front explaining the situation he was put in by Çerkez Ethem's betrayal, asking for consideration and understanding.

Subsequently, on June 6, 1921, he was pardoned and ordered by İsmet Paşa to stay behind enemy lines and act as a guerilla fighter. İsmet Paşa wrote the following letter;

Dear Pehlivan Aga and the Commander of the Pehlivan Platoon. This is the answer of your letter written on 1st of January 1921.

I have received your letter. I thank you all very much. I have closely witnessed how heroically your platoon fought against the Greeks and against internal rebellions. I congratulate you deeply from my hearth, that you are an admirable commander. Because of your services, I forgive you. You will stay within the occupied zone with your platoon, gather your supply from within. You will constantly harass the enemy's supply lines, roads, bridges and bomb them with dynamites. The enemy may come to Ankara. But in the end we will be victorious. Be strong, be persistent. I wish from Allah the continuation and oftenness of your successes and that you are of good luck, I ask from Allah and kiss your and all the members of your platoon's eyes. With regards

Signed. Commander of the Western front Colonel İsmet Date 6th of January 1921

He joined to the Governor of Simav who also was a Rumelian Turk from Belitsa village of Melnik. Thus, he was assigned as the commander of the 11th Raider "Akıncı" detachment, tasked with the districts of Demirci and Simav.

He married the daughter-in-law of Molla Mehmed, who was widowed during the Great War, to gather support from Anatolian Turks in the mountainous vicinity of Gördes. His wife and 3 stepchildren and mother-in-law were captured by the Greek Army and were held as hostage nearly for a year. Greek officers tried to recruit him for the Greek side on many occasions, but he always refused with a very harsh language. On June 24, 1922, he replied to the previous letter (written on 7/06/1922) from the Commander of the Greek forces in Gördes:

"Senin iyi, kurnaz bir adam olduğunu biliyordum... Halbuki pek ahmak imişsin! Beni bir karı için teslim olur zanneder, vatana hiyanet mi ümit ediyorsun? Bir karı değil, yüz bin karı olsa ben gâvura ne teslim olur ne de öyle şart şurta bakarım. Ben gâvur öldürmekten başka bir şey anlamam. Sen onu başkalarına anlat! Sana son nasihatim: Benim karıyı öldürür ve ayaklarını kıçına sokarsın dostum." - 11 nci Akıncı Müfreze K. Parti Pehlivan

Subsequently, his superior İbrahim Ethem Akıncı added an explanation for the harsh language.

"Bir parça nezaket ve nezahetten ari olduğuna müteessifim. Af edersiniz; çünkü Pehlivan bir parça müteessir olduğundan hatırını kırmamak için aynen yazmağa mecbur oldum" - Kaymakam İbrahim Ethem

According to Greek sources, he and his guerilla bands were pursuing the remaining Greek forces under the commands of Colonels Plastiras and Gonatas and fought at the last battle of the Greco-Turkish War on September 12, 1922, in Uzunkuyu. However, he was in Sındırgı on the 10th of September and was summoned to Balıkesir by his commander for his eye surgery as he was wounded since 16 August 1922. For that reason he became known as the blind Pehlivan (Κιόρ Μπεχλιβάν) by the Greeks.

Lieutenant Ali Rıza Akıncı, who mentions him in his memoirs, during Çerkez Ethem's betrayal does not mention him nor his Akıncı units in the liberation of İzmir and until the Burning of Smyrna which he witnessed from Sabuncubeli on the road to Manisa.

== After the war ==
After the war he was united with his Anatolian wife with prisoner exchange and shortly after his family from Serres, whom he did not see since 1912 came to Manisa with the Population exchange between Greece and Turkey. He was accused with Independence Tribunals on the charges of expropriating the belongings of Çerkez Ethem up to point that his wife's jewellery were considered as booty. However, he was pardoned, and all belongings were returned and with consideration he and 167 others were subsequently awarded with the famous İstiklal Madalyası, the medal of Independence.

== Legacy ==
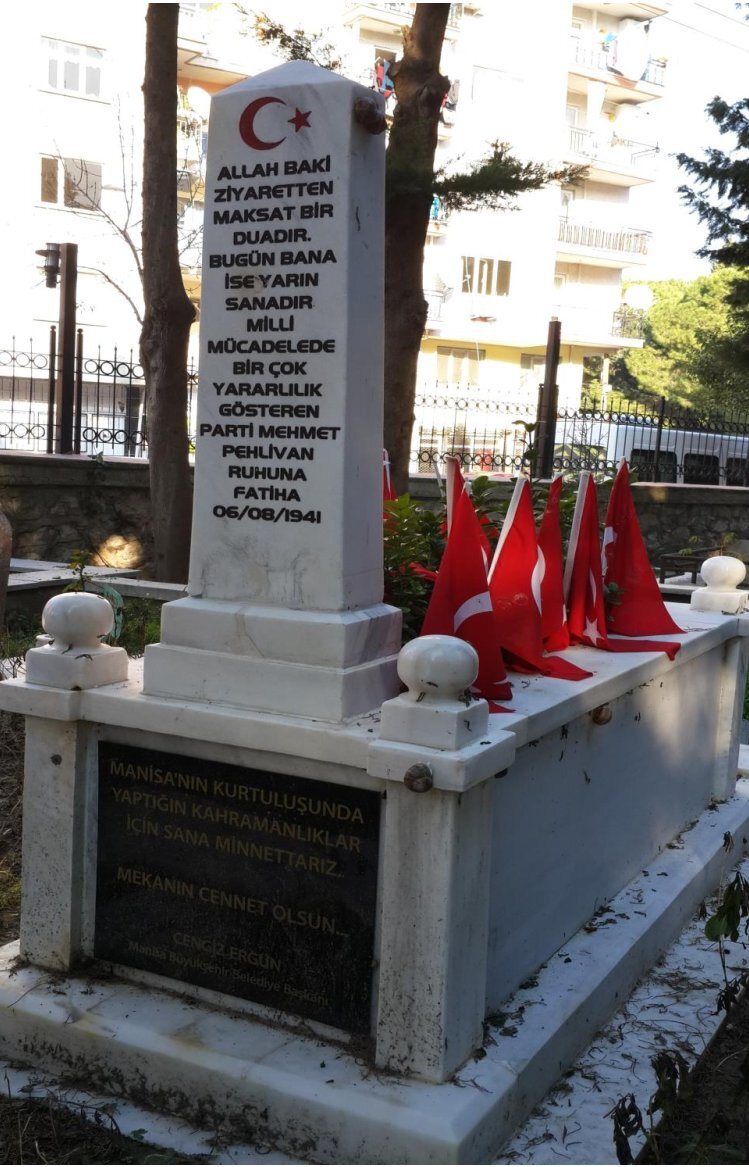
Parti Pehlivan's Tomb in Manisa

A statue of him and his companions were erected in Gördes.

His contributions to Turkish War of Independence and to the establishment of the Turkish Republic were also remarkable.

His name is given to a street in Manisa on the last municipal meeting of the year 2020, receiving a solid vote.

He was referred in many Greek accounts, one being the famous Bloody Earth by Dido Sotiriou.

Erol Toy, a Turkish writer has written a play named after him in 1973.

== See also ==
- Turkish War of Independence
- World War I
- Efe
- Macedonomachos
- Komitadji
- Zeibeks
