= Northern Iraq =

Northern Iraq may refer to:

- Assyrian homeland
- Iraqi Kurdistan
- Kurdistan Region
- Upper Mesopotamia
