= Eleftherios Noufrakis =

Archimandrite Eleftherios Noufrakis
- Ελευθέριος Νουφράκης
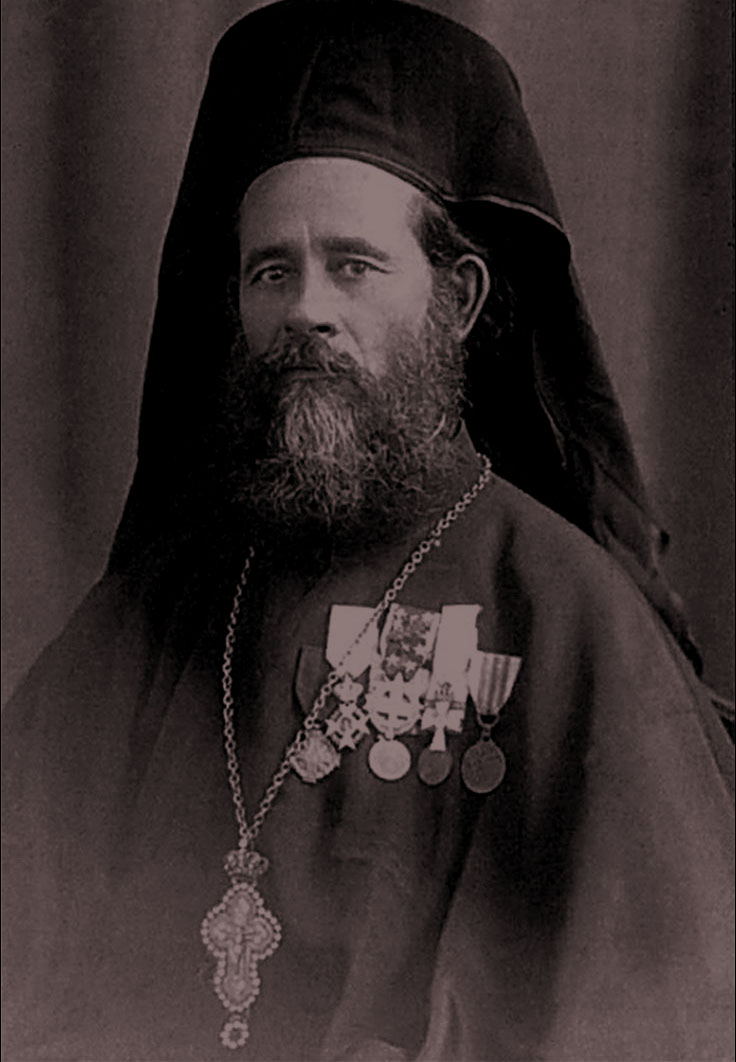
- Archimandrite Eleftherios Noufrakis
- Born: Emmanouil Noufrakis (Εμμανουήλ Νουφράκης); 1872 or 1874; Alones, Rethymno, Crete Vilayet, Ottoman Empire
- Died: 5 August 1941; Athens, German-occupied Greece
- Education: Athonias Ecclesiastical Academy; Rizarios Ecclesiastical School (1905–1907); National and Kapodistrian University of Athens (1907–1911)
- Occupations: Military chaplain, preacher, teacher of Greek
- Known for: Reported celebration of the Divine Liturgy at Hagia Sophia (1919)
- Parent(s): Spyridon Noufrakis and Eleni Kyriakaki

Ecclesiastical career
- Religion: Eastern Orthodoxy
- Church: Greek Orthodox Church
- Writings: War Memoirs (1914)
- Title: Archimandrite

Eleftherios Noufrakis
- Noufrakis as a military archimandrite (1915)
- Military career
- Allegiance: Kingdom of Greece
- Branch: Hellenic Army (military chaplaincy)
- Service years: 1912–1940
- Rank: Major; Lieutenant colonel on retirement (1934)
- Units: 1st Serres Regiment, Serres Division (1917–1918); 34th Infantry Regiment, 2nd Infantry Division (1919–1921)
- Conflicts: First Balkan War (1912–1913); Battle of Sarantaporo; Battle of Yenidje; Battle of Bizani; Second Balkan War (1913); Battle of Kilkis–Lachanas; World War I (1917–1918); Battle of Skra-di-Legen; Battle of Doiran (1918); Southern Russia intervention (1919); Battle of Berezovka; Fighting at Kremidovka; Defence of Odesa; Fighting at Yushun and Eskiköy-Zama; Greco-Turkish War (1919–1922); Battle of Aslıhanlar–Dumlupınar (1921); Greco-Italian War (1940–1941)

Archimandrite Eleftherios Noufrakis (Greek: Ελευθέριος Νουφράκης, born Emmanouil Noufrakis, 1872 or 1874 – 5 August 1941), known earlier in religious life as Paisios, was a Greek Orthodox priest, archimandrite and military chaplain in the Hellenic Army. He served during the Balkan Wars, the First World War, the Southern Russia intervention, the Greco-Turkish War (1919–1922) and the Greco-Italian War.

Noufrakis is most notable for celebrating a Greek Orthodox Divine Liturgy inside Hagia Sophia in Constantinople in January 1919, when the city was under Allied occupation, the first such service there since the fall of Constantinople in 1453.

== Early life ==
Archimandrite Eleftherios Noufrakis was born in the village of Alones, in Rethymno, Crete, in 1872, or, according to other accounts, 1874. He was born during a period of Cretan uprisings against Ottoman rule, in which many insurgents sought the island's union with the independent Kingdom of Greece.

His father was Spyridon Noufrakis of Alones, a participant and standard-bearer in the Cretan revolutions. His mother was Eleni Kyriakaki, from the nearby village of Arolithi, Rethymno. Both were descendants of the Vranas and Gavalas families of Sfakia, Chania, families associated in local accounts with the Cretan uprisings.

The surname Noufrakis is believed to have originated as an old local nickname, perhaps bestowed in honour of the Church of Saint Onuphrius of Egypt, which had occupied a prominent position in the centre of Alones centuries earlier.

Accounts of his early life emphasise the influence of his family's Orthodox faith and support for union with Greece on his later religious and national commitments.

== School years and monastic life ==
In 1880, at the age of six or eight, and with his parents' agreement and at his godfather's urging, he went to Roustika, a principal village in the wider Alones area, to begin his education at a school operating inside the Monastery of Prophet Elijah. This schooling may have been informal, since regular schools apparently did not operate in Alones or Roustika at that time. His teachers were learned monks of the monastery, foremost among them the hieromonk and teacher Agathangelos Vernados. The historic Monastery of Prophet Elijah in Roustika, established during Venetian rule in Crete, was an important centre of Orthodox religious life and Cretan cultural traditions. Under Ottoman rule it enjoyed a period of spiritual flourishing and played an important role in the Cretan uprisings against the Turks.

At this monastery, the young Emmanouil learned his first lessons while cultivating his spiritual life and strengthening his religious and national convictions. He remained there for instruction and training until 1887, by which time he was fifteen years old. Upon completing his education, he expressed a wish to follow the monastic life, inspired by the monastery's brotherhood. Following what he called the "call from above", he left Crete, probably around 1890, for Mount Athos, where he lived as a novice at one of its monasteries, perhaps in a monastic hut, a skete, a place of hesychastic retreat or a hermitage (no documentary details survive). Little is known about his life and activities during his years on Athos, from 1890 to 1905. As a novice receiving the assistance of an Athonite monastery, he enrolled at the Athonias Ecclesiastical Academy, continuing the kind of education he had received at the Monastery of Prophet Elijah in Roustika. During this period he was tonsured as a monk and received the name Paisios. As part of his spiritual and intellectual pursuits during those same fifteen years, he also attended the school of the Brotherhood of the Holy Sepulchre at the Holy Sepulchre's dependency in Constantinople, intending eventually to study at the Halki seminary. That aim was never realised. His active associations as a monk of Mount Athos with both the Ecumenical Patriarchate of Constantinople and the Metropolis of Mytilene marked his path towards serving the Church and its people. At one of these places, he was ordained to the first degree of the priesthood.

== Higher education and academic career ==
Hierodeacon Paisios Noufrakis enrolled in 1905 as an external ecclesiastical student at the Rizarios Ecclesiastical School in Athens, where he studied until 1907 under the direction of Nektarios Kephalas, Bishop of Pentapolis (director, 1894–1908), later revered as one of the great modern saints of the Orthodox Church. In this educational, spiritual and ecclesiastical environment, Paisios matured as a student while also taking part in religious services conducted under the bishop's leadership.

At the same time, the Rizarios School had become a centre of Orthodox religious life and patriotism in Athenian society. A strong movement in support of the Macedonian Struggle (1904–1908) developed among its students. The movement aimed to strengthen Greek influence in Ottoman Macedonia and promote its eventual incorporation into Greece. This movement took several forms: the school's governing council granted scholarships from its endowment to young Macedonian candidates for the priesthood, organised fundraising for Macedonians and held memorial services for those who had fallen in the struggle.

After graduating from the Rizarios Ecclesiastical School, Paisios Noufrakis entered the School of Theology of the National and Kapodistrian University of Athens in 1907, obtaining his degree in 1911. In that year, or the following year (1912), he was appointed a teacher of Greek at the Greek school of Aitoliko in Aetolia-Acarnania. He was serving there when the First Balkan War began in October 1912.

== Participation in the Balkan Wars ==
Hierodeacon Paisios Noufrakis (1912–1913)

At the outbreak of the First Balkan War, Hierodeacon Paisios Noufrakis sought leave from his teaching post to enlist in the Greek army. After receiving an official movement order, he departed for the front.

Addressing his mother, he wrote:

"The law of our homeland prevented me, Mother,
from following the army with a weapon in my hand.
And after many obstacles I found the opportunity
to obtain an official order to proceed.
Once I had gathered what I needed for my ministry,
I hastened at once to aid our sacred homeland."

He departed Athens on 2 October for Larissa, before proceeding to Elassona, which Greek forces under the commander-in-chief, Crown Prince Constantine, had already liberated on 6 October.

On 7 October, the Greek army advanced towards the Sarantaporo pass, where substantial Turkish forces had previously entrenched themselves. At the Battle of Sarantaporo (9–10 October 1912), which brought the Greeks their first great victory and opened the way towards Servia (10 October 1912), the Haliacmon River and Kozani—captured on 11 October 1912—Hierodeacon Paisios Noufrakis first experienced combat.

He vividly recalled in his memoirs:

"And the next day came the battle of Sarantaporo,
throughout which I worked, moving about on foot.
I ran everywhere, Mother, to bring comfort,
caring nothing for rifle fire or cannon shots.
I gave communion to our brothers and buried others,
and called to still others, always shouting 'Forward!'" [...]

After the victorious battles at Servia and Kastania and the capture of Kozani, Grevena and Katerini (16 October), came the Battle of Giannitsa (18–20 October), decisive for the further course of operations. Accounts describe Paisios as displaying courage and heroism, not only encouraging his comrades but himself fighting on the front line. At Giannitsa, perhaps the bloodiest and most important battle of the First Balkan War, he received his first decoration for bravery. The capture of Giannitsa opened the way for Greek troops to advance into the heart of Macedonia and towards Thessaloniki, which they liberated on 26 October 1912, the feast day of its patron saint, Demetrius of Thessaloniki. Paisios Noufrakis was present as an eyewitness to those great, epic and unparalleled moments of Hellenism.

He wrote:

"[...] At dusk, Mother, the ambassadors came down,
and surrendered Thessaloniki entirely into our hands.
And we surrounded it until midnight
on the twenty-sixth of this month of October,
when, as is known, we celebrate the feast of Demetrius,
the feast of our Myrrh-streaming one, the feast of a great saint. [...]
And the next morning our brothers came out,
where we were staying, men and women arrived,
weeping and kissing us for the freedom
we had given them at such great sacrifice." [...]

Hierodeacon Eleftherios Noufrakis (right) and his fellow fighter, Hieromonk Agapios Kartsonakis (left), during the Second Balkan War (1913). The photograph was also reproduced on the cover of the Athens magazine Ellas (issue 509, January 1914). A copy is displayed at the War Museum of Nafplio.

Paisios Noufrakis next went to Ostrovo, where he sought to strengthen the morale and resolve of the Greek soldiers.

After Ostrovo, he participated in the Greek army's successful offensive to liberate Gornichevo (Kelli), and at Banitsa (Vevi) he buried twenty fallen Greek soldiers with military honours. He then advanced towards Florina, which had been liberated the previous day, on the feast of the Archangels (8 November). He also briefly visited the islands of Lesbos and Chios, then struggling for their freedom. The Greek navy liberated them on 11 and 13 November 1912 respectively.

Hierodeacon Paisios also took part in the siege of Bizani in Epirus in February 1913, fulfilling both his military and religious duties and encouraging Greek soldiers on the front line during the struggle to liberate Ioannina, into which the Greek army entered in triumph on 21–22 February 1913.

He recorded in his memoirs:

"As soon as I learned, Mother, that the Serbs were in Monastir,
a place of great importance to Hellenism,
I changed my course and went through Mytilene,
and from there to our Chios and Emin's inn.
Everywhere and always I spoke to the men as I ought,
with words and feelings burning with fire. [...]
There at the front I remained for twenty days,
teaching and advising them day and evening.
Disregarding death, I came and went,
and where the men kept watch at night, I prayed with them." [...]

After the liberation of Ioannina, Paisios also participated in the Greek army's victorious operations at Gjirokastër and Sarandë, on 27 February and 3 March 1913 respectively. These developments led to the end of the First Balkan War and the signing of the Treaty of London (1913) (17 May 1913), under which Turkey was obliged to surrender to the Balkan allies all territory west of the Enos–Midia line and renounce its rights over Crete. This aroused indescribable emotion and enthusiasm in Paisios, the Cretans and Greeks generally, as the road had opened for the union of Crete with mother Greece. Peace in the Balkans, however, was short-lived. The Bulgarians were said to desire possession of Eastern Macedonia and Thrace, chiefly in order to gain access to the Aegean Sea, an ambition traced in the account back to Byzantine times. Consequently, the Second Balkan War broke out fiercely on 16 June 1913, with an outcome of decisive importance for Hellenism. This development also affected Paisios, who obtained formal permission from the Metropolitan of Athens, Theocletus I Minopoulos, dated "Athens, 19 June 1913", authorising him, with the permission of the Ministry of Military Affairs, "to accompany the army, providing the ecclesiastical services pertaining to his office".

Thereafter, Paisios proceeded to Štip, taking an active part in the struggle for its recapture by the Greek army and taking part in the Battle of Lachanas.

The Second Balkan War began on 29 June 1913 (16 June O.S.) and ended with the Treaty of Bucharest (1913) on 10 August 1913 (28 July O.S.). The treaty consolidated Greek territorial gains, substantially expanding the territory of the Greek state.

Paisios wrote, "on the occasion of the signing of peace at Bucharest in the Greco-Bulgarian War":

[...] "We come from the borders of Bulgaria,
which once laid claim to the land of Macedonia.
And our Thessaloniki, our golden inheritance,
it wished to snatch from us with utter dishonour.
We bear again with honour the shields of the nation,
we have not disappointed our homeland's golden hopes.
The oath 'With it or on it' of our mother Greece
is for us forever the branch of our laurel wreath.
... Our blue flag, the star of liberty,
we planted on the borders of Bulgaria.
And now our flag, dyed with our blood,
we bring to you, our brothers, crowned with laurel." [...]

== Archimandrite ==
After the Balkan Wars, Hierodeacon Paisios Noufrakis returned to his work as a teacher of Greek at the school of Aitoliko in Aetolia-Acarnania, where he taught until the end of the 1915–1916 school year. During this period he published a work bearing the full title "Paisios S. Noufrakis, Archdeacon and Theologian, War Memoirs: A Brief Historical Account of What We Witnessed during the Greco-Turkish War and a Collection of Occasional Poems Inspired by Our Two Victorious Campaigns, Athens 1914", dedicated "To the sacred memory of my much-beloved father Spyridon and mother Eleni".

During the same period, Paisios Noufrakis was ordained a presbyter and hieromonk, receiving the ecclesiastical title of archimandrite and changing his monastic name from Paisios to Eleftherios. Accounts of his life connect his choice of the name Eleftherios with both his support for Greek national aspirations and his admiration for Eleftherios Venizelos, under whose leadership Crete was united with Greece.

== First World War ==
The outbreak of the First World War on 28 July 1914 (15 July O.S.), prompted by Austria's attack on Serbia, had major political consequences for Greece. These resulted from the disagreement between Prime Minister Eleftherios Venizelos and King Constantine I over the country's attitude towards the belligerents—the Entente Powers and the Central Powers. Venizelos supported Greece's entry into the war on the side of the Entente, believing that national interests required it. Constantine, by contrast, strongly favoured Greek neutrality, a position that Venizelos's supporters believed favoured the Central Powers. Their disagreement escalated into the National Schism, culminating in the establishment of the Movement of National Defence (16 August 1916) and the formation of a government by Venizelos (26 September 1916), based in Thessaloniki. Archimandrite Eleftherios Noufrakis, then employed as a teacher of Greek at Aitoliko, watched Greece become divided into two rival states. Following his convictions, he hastily departed for Thessaloniki on 20 August 1916, joined the Movement of National Defence and placed himself at Venizelos's side.

Noufrakis subsequently joined the 1st Infantry Regiment of the Serres Division and actively participated in World War I operations involving Greek military forces. According to accounts of his service, he took part in fighting on the Macedonian front during 1917–1918 and especially in the Battle of Doiran (8 September 1918). His involvement in the operations of 1917–1918—at Raviné, Skra, Doiran and elsewhere—was recorded and emphatically praised in the poem "Muse: On the Arrival of Archimandrite Eleftherios Noufrakis", printed in Athens by the Blazoudakis Brothers printing house and signed with the initials P. G., apparently by one of his comrades.

Extracts from the verses follow:

"From the front has come to us the Giant of the Idea,
of National Freedom, with no empty words.
Fearless and steadfast, he rushes to the trenches,
and counsels the sentries, keeping watch day and night.
From there, tireless again, he goes to the reserves,
gathering everyone for sermons and liturgies.
Yes, like an eagle he soars high, spreading comfort,
with every word and deed he guides us all,
so that we bear every misfortune and pain without complaint,
for only thus will our homeland once more be glorified. [...]
In attacks he is always the first to face danger,
seeking great honour for Greece!
And the soldiers, seeing so much courage in him,
and hearing his shouts delivered with such composure,
run close behind him to help him,
to defeat the Bulgarian and German swiftly!
Who else was first to cross the hill of Dogani?
Who else at Raviné, at Skra, at Doiran,
where all of us were astonished to hear his cries,
to see his speed and his achievements!
He captured hundreds of the first prisoners,
handed them over to a few men and ran on with the leaders.
Having struck the rear of the fighting Bulgarians,
they rushed to his feet, begging for mercy!" [...]

== Participation in the Crimean campaign ==
Archimandrite Eleftherios Noufrakis was a member of the Greek expeditionary force sent by Eleftherios Venizelos to Crimea at the request of France and the other Western Allies. It participated in the campaign against Russian revolutionaries as part of the wider Allied intervention in the Russian Civil War in southern Russia, intended to prevent the Bolsheviks from consolidating their control of the region after the October Revolution of 1917. The expedition involved Greek, French and Polish forces, as well as White Russian volunteers. Venizelos decided to involve Greece after the French prime minister, Georges Clemenceau, formally promised the Greek ambassador in Paris, Athos Romanos, that "France will take the initiative concerning a territorial expansion of Greece in Thrace and will warmly support a solution of the Smyrna question in Greece's favour, if proposed by England or America." Through participation in the Crimean campaign, Venizelos was evidently seeking a more favourable attitude from the Entente towards Greek claims in Eastern Thrace and Asia Minor. He did not, however, anticipate the reaction of the Russian revolutionaries, which events ultimately showed to have disastrous consequences for Hellenism.

The transfer of the first Greek military units to Crimea, comprising the two divisions Greece contributed to the Allied expeditionary force, began on 1 January 1919 and was completed on 21 March 1919. Although the Russian revolutionary forces succeeded in turning the Allied operations into a series of rearguard actions and retreats, Greek accounts praised the conduct and discipline of the expeditionary troops.

Portrait of military Archimandrite Eleftherios Noufrakis

Noufrakis belonged to the 34th Infantry Regiment of the 2nd Division. It was the first unit to leave for Crimea and took part in the battles of Berezovka and Kremidovka and the defence of Odesa. The source describes the regiment as playing a particularly important role in the defence of Crimea. On 10 March 1919 it was transferred to Sevastopol and took part in the battles of Yushun (23 March) and Eskiköy-Zama (25 March). On 14 April 1919 it crossed into Romania to help defend Bessarabia against a possible attack by the Red Army. The regiment, in which Noufrakis served, remained in Romania until late 1919, when it was transferred to Smyrna.

Referring to his participation in the expedition, his comrade P. G. wrote in Muse:

"[...] And when he saw her free, he hurried to Russia,
the country that had shown us such great protection!
And leaving the Defence behind, he went to the Division,
the Second, of Athens, for the salvation
of our noble protectors and our holy religion. [...]
And there he proved an example in the cause of freedom,
that divine freedom, where God too was buried as a man,
to show the honour and glory that shall belong
to him who dies while liberating others
and saving his homeland from dishonourable slavery! ..."

Greece's participation in the unsuccessful Allied intervention in the Russian Civil War came at a heavy cost to the Greek communities of southern Russia. They were regrettably regarded as being of "questionable loyalty" under the new policies that followed the October Revolution of 1917. The intervention was simultaneously seen as a "hostile act" against Russia, prejudicing the Russians against the Greek army's subsequent presence in Asia Minor. As a result, they turned to Mustafa Kemal and helped bring about his eventual victory in the Near East, leading ultimately to the greatest tragedy in the history of Hellenism.

== Divine Liturgy in Hagia Sophia ==
Accounts of Noufrakis's January 1919 liturgy, including later reconstructions and recollections, form a substantial part of his biography. The following narrative reflects those Greek sources. Their details of private conversations and participants' thoughts are reported rather than independently established.

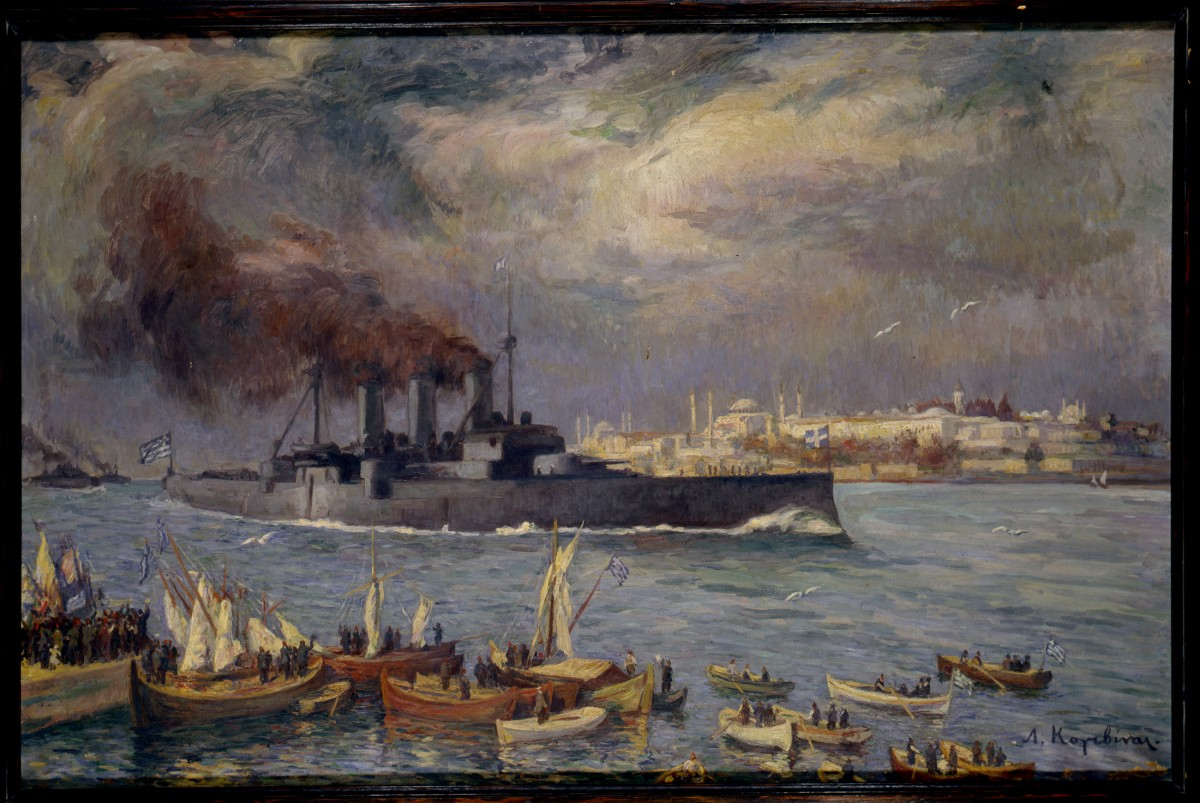
The reception of the Averof off Constantinople in November 1918. Hagia Sophia is visible in the background (History of the Greek Nation, volume XV, p. 93).

During the transfer of Greek army units to participate in the Allied operations in Crimea, the military transports Tigre and Normandie, accompanied by the Greek fleet led by the armoured cruiser Georgios Averof, anchored off Constantinople on 5 January 1919, carrying large numbers of Greek soldiers. At that time, following Turkey's surrender in the First World War, Constantinople was under the authority of the Entente powers. One of the ships carried the 34th Infantry Regiment, commanded by Christos Tsolakopoulos and including Archimandrite Eleftherios Noufrakis.

According to Greek accounts, the sight of Hagia Sophia prompted considerable emotion among the soldiers. Then, according to the account, "Tsolakopoulos orders all the men of the regiment on board to form up armed on deck. Having given the necessary instructions, he climbs to the bridge. The buglers sound the order to fix bayonets. Then comes 'Present arms'. While the men stand in this position and the salute to the flag is sounded, Colonel Tsolakopoulos unfurls the regiment's battle flag ... At the sight of it, Captain Alexandros Hatzikyriakos, commander of the cruiser 'G. Averof', and Lieutenant Commander Theocharis, commander of the destroyer 'Keravnos'" "order their crews to assemble and ceremonially hoist the Greek flag on their forward masts as well, while the national anthem is played. Soldiers and crews break into cheers for the nation."

News of the Greek soldiers' arrival in the Bosphorus spread rapidly, and accounts describe hundreds of Constantinopolitan Greeks gathering at the quays to watch the ships. Many attempted to approach the warships in small boats to greet the soldiers in person. A delegation of prominent Greeks of Constantinople, led by Professor Yangitsis, enthusiastically welcomed the arrivals and asked Colonel Christos Tsolakopoulos to allow his men to visit the city. The commander of the 34th Infantry Regiment granted shore leave to some officers and to those soldiers who had relatives in Constantinople. The regiment's military chaplain, Archimandrite Eleftherios Noufrakis, accompanied this group. The Greek servicemen also intended to visit the Patriarchate and the locum tenens of the Ecumenical Throne, Metropolitan Dorotheos of Bursa.

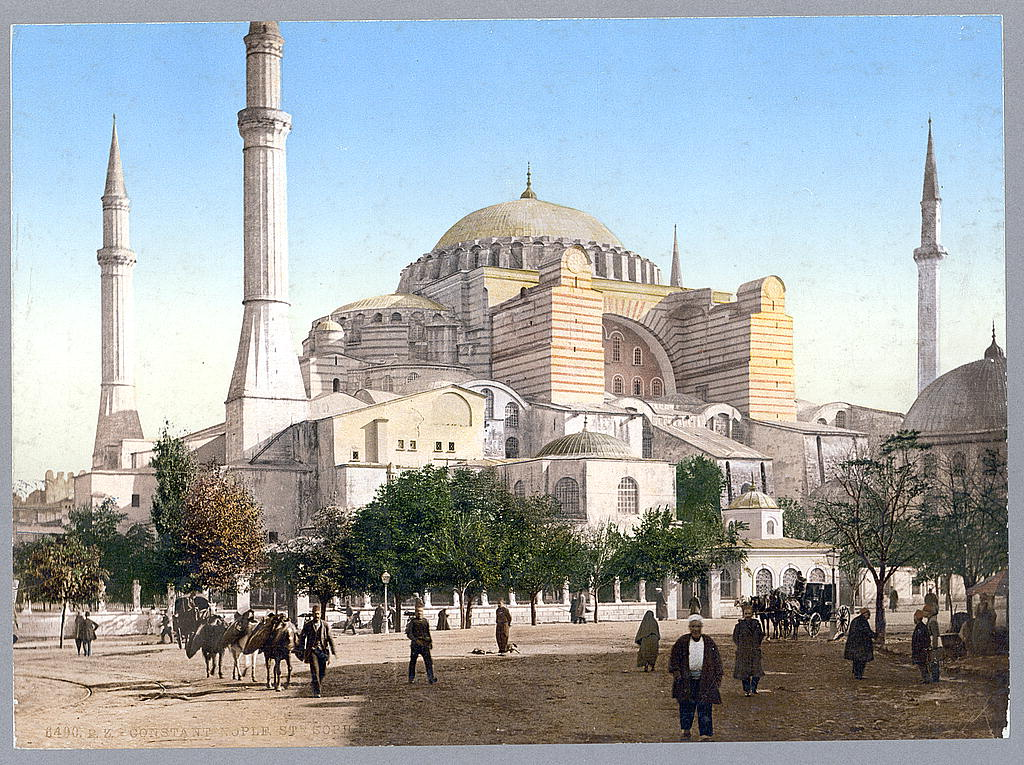
The Church of the Holy Wisdom of God, Hagia Sophia, Constantinople (engraving, 1890)

Noufrakis and several Greek officers first visited Hagia Sophia, a site of particular religious and historical significance for Greek Orthodox Christians that was then functioning as a mosque.

The accounts describe the scene as unexpected to those present. First they heard Father Lefteris loudly chanting hymns, troparia, doxologies and supplications. He then put on his epitrachelion (priestly stole), intoned "Blessed is the Kingdom of the Father and of the Son and of the Holy Spirit ..." and began the Divine Liturgy beneath the thousand-year-old vaults and heaven-reaching dome of the Great Church, in what the accounts described as the first such service there in 466 years.

The four Greek officers in the group—Brigadier Frantzis, Major Liaromatis, Captain Stamatiou and Second Lieutenant Nikolaou—together with a few Constantinopolitan Greeks who happened to be in Hagia Sophia at the time, were said to have joined in the liturgy, acting as chanters.

Accounts report confusion followed by objections from the caretaker and other Turks present. Initially, however, they did not dare intervene in the presence of Greek soldiers. Before long, Hagia Sophia filled with Constantinopolitan Greeks who witnessed the service.

Father Lefteris continued the sacred rite undisturbed, assisted by officers and soldiers acting as chanters and candle-bearers. The Divine Liturgy was approaching its conclusion.

According to the accounts, some Turkish bystanders then objected forcefully to the service. The Greeks defended the service, and a general confrontation inside the church was narrowly averted thanks first to Anglo-French intervention and then to the arrival of a Turkish official, who ordered his co-religionists to calm down and allow the Greeks to leave the Great Church unharmed.

After the liturgy, Noufrakis and the other participants began to leave. But while Father Noufrakis was in the precincts of the Great Church, he was attacked by a Turk who wounded him in the shoulder, though not seriously.

News of Father Lefteris's celebration of the liturgy in Hagia Sophia immediately spread among the city's Greeks, the soldiers on their way to Crimea and the Entente representatives in Constantinople. Following a formal protest by Sultan Mehmed VI, the Allied representatives strongly complained to Eleftherios Venizelos about the provocation caused by the incident. According to these accounts, the objections led Venizelos to issue a public condemnation of the incident. Later, however, he not only privately praised Noufrakis but decorated him for what is characterised as his heroic, profoundly significant deed, which had fulfilled the most sacred dream of the Greek nation.

The war correspondent of the Greek expeditionary force in Ukraine, Kostas Misailidis, wrote in his War Dispatches, among other things:

"When the Greek ships passed through Constantinople in 1919, carrying our 2nd and 13th Divisions to Russia, Noufrakis went ashore in the city with a group of officers of the 2nd Division, and they went straight to Hagia Sophia. No sooner were they inside than Father Noufrakis put on his stole and began the liturgy. The Turkish guards of Hagia Sophia were startled and grew angry. They notified others, and before long the church was filled with Turks holding pistols. Noufrakis remained unperturbed and continued his liturgy. Our officers all drew their pistols, determined to die there together. Who knows what would have happened inside Hagia Sophia if English and French officers had not arrived in time to separate the Greeks and Turks, who were on the point of slaughtering one another."

Lieutenant General Dimitrios Vakas added the following observations about Archimandrite Eleftherios Noufrakis and his patriotic activities:

"The incident of the liturgy in Hagia Sophia, which caused an uproar among the Turks, came to the knowledge of the late statesman Venizelos. When he later summoned Noufrakis, he reprimanded him, but at the same time congratulated him on his patriotic initiative, saying: 'If I had another ten priests like you, I could accomplish many things.' This unforgettable military priest was known throughout the military world of the time, and naturally also to the great statesman, for his outstanding patriotic service. During the Battle of Doiran, the fearless Father Noufrakis, carrying an enormous Mannlicher pistol with stock and sling, a Bulgarian trophy from a previous battle, moved from company to company and battalion to battalion, encouraging and inspiring the men, and even placing himself at the head of a detachment whose commander had been put out of action. He would then go from the front-line units to the regimental command post (1st Regiment of Serres), reporting the positions of the various units and thus serving as liaison between the front line and regimental command."

"On days when the army was resting in camp, Father Noufrakis was just as constantly active, visiting all the detachments in turn two or three times a month to celebrate liturgies both for the units under his care and for neighbouring units."

"He insisted on taking part in the Russian expedition, presenting himself at General Headquarters and demanding it as a personal favour, for this fearless servant of the Most High had had a vision of Hagia Sophia!"

In his personal unpublished handwritten Diary, preserved in the Historical Museum of his birthplace, Alones, Rethymno, Archimandrite Eleftherios Noufrakis expressly referred to his exploit at Hagia Sophia in at least two passages.

In the first, he declared himself grateful that Almighty God had deemed him worthy, and that "the lot had fallen" to him to enter Hagia Sophia as a victor and conqueror "with many other lads of the 2nd Division" and offer "hymns, martial songs and thanks from the depths of our souls and devotion to the All-Good, Compassionate and Mighty God".

In the second passage, he described the event more fully and with an instructive purpose.

Extracts read:

"And as soon as we safely reached our City (Byzantium),
with one voice we headed reverently towards the church.
The day was rainy and overcast,
yet we were all inflamed with enthusiasm.
With the Laconian Gargalidis at our head (P.D.M.P.),
we marched upright, on foot and openly.
Yes! Straight to the church we hurried as Christians,
and found ourselves inside, without any assistance.
And we sang martial hymns, songs and thanksgiving
to the all-wise God, for the favour
of letting the lot fall to us to enter, swords in hand,
that legendary church and offer our prayers.
And when the hodjas began to grow very angry,
I raised my voice all the louder, bidding them remain calm
until we had finished all our prayers,
and then we would make our way to Odessa.
All this was done for the glory of my Cross,
my good inspiration from the beginning, to my enemy's grief.
Yes! I never grew bitter over so many sorrows,
nor did I become indignant at so many injustices,
seeking individual rewards instead of the common good
served ... faithfully, purely and without deceit.
For I regarded material things and praise as refuse,
and remained undaunted in the full bloom of my resolve.
So when, on our way back, I heard them reproaching me,
with unreasonable complaints and slanders,
saying that I had supposedly made our visit to the church unpleasant,
I easily silenced them, for the glory of our Cross!
Then I told them I was ready, before their very eyes,
... to put them in their place and drive out their enemy!
They needed only to show courage and follow me,
rather than turn their backs and strive in vain!
Then they left me alone and changed their tune,
and so we proceeded to Asia Minor.
..........................................................................
These were the plain words I found to speak,
and I have never regretted taking this path.
The truth is bitter, but it must be spoken,
for only through it can the world benefit ..."

The action of Archimandrite Eleftherios Noufrakis inside the church of Hagia Sophia in Constantinople was remembered by Greek writers as a symbolic expression of Greek Orthodox and national aspirations.

== Participation in the Asia Minor campaign ==
Archimandrite Eleftherios Noufrakis being treated at the 1st Military Hospital of Smyrna (April 1921), following his serious injury on 27 March 1921 (O.S.) during the Battle of Aslıhanlar–Dumlupınar.

As part of the Allied expedition to Crimea, Greek participation in the Allied expedition was closely connected with the subsequent deployment to Smyrna. When the eighteen transports and other warships carrying units of the Hellenic Army (I Army Corps) sailed from the port of Eleftheres, Kavala, on 30 April 1919, Colonel Nikolaos Zafeiriou issued the daily order of the 1st Division, I Army Corps, in which he stated:

"Wherever we may be sent, we shall certainly be going to liberate our enslaved brothers. The enthusiasm that fills us all is entirely justified, but any improper manner of expressing it is unjustifiable." He was addressing soldiers who did not yet know the port to which they were heading.

The convoy reached Gera on Lesbos on 1 May. In early May 1919, an official proclamation by Prime Minister and Minister of Military Affairs Eleftherios Venizelos announced Smyrna, a major city of longstanding Greek historical importance, as the force's destination.

The landing of the Greek army began on 15 May 1919 (2 May O.S.) on the waterfront of Smyrna, amid an outpouring of enthusiasm from the dense crowds of Greeks who had gathered from very early on to welcome it. The disastrous outcome of the campaign still lay several years ahead.

The Entente powers' instructions to Greece regarding the security of Smyrna and the surrounding area by the Hellenic Army were vague. As historians K. Megalokonomos and K. Fotiadis observe, Greece's allies had sent Greek soldiers there partly to advance their own competing diplomatic and strategic interests, rather than simply to endorse Greek territorial claims. Their decision "was more a consequence of disagreements among the Allies than a conscious decision to support Greek claims in Asia Minor."

Many Greeks regarded the deployment as an opportunity to advance Greek national aspirations in Ionia. Supporters of the campaign saw it as a war of national liberation, while the changing attitudes of the Allied powers subsequently weakened Greece's position against the Turkish nationalist movement.

Archimandrite Eleftherios Noufrakis followed the Greek army into Ionia. Having returned from the Crimean expedition and arrived at Smyrna on 3 July 1919, he immediately joined the Army of Asia Minor.

In his unpublished handwritten Diary, he wrote:

"We disembarked at Smyrna on the third of July" (1919)
"and were given a welcome worthy of great praise.
At garrison headquarters I found a man named Geronymakis,
a giant in spirit and fearless in battle.
And in Sevdiköy, bearing gifts in their hands,
young and old came out to welcome us,
leaving us astonished by their words and their manner.
........................................................................
For you, our Ionia, we went to Russia,
and there too we shed blood to free you from slavery
to the dreadful, faithless Turkish beast,
bloodthirsty and wretched throughout its life.
On the Dniester we remained for a night and a day
until we could cross it and reach the other bank.
The current kept rising, and we were nearly drowned,
never to arrive here and look upon you.
But now that we have seen you, our joy is great,
to behold you free and honoured once again,
as you were renowned from the beginning throughout the world,
so very proud and so greatly honoured.
You gave birth to poetry and philosophy,
you opened your arms to the holy religion
of Jesus, who brought peace into the world,
heavenly liberty and justice ..."

Until early December 1919, the Greeks maintained a defensive posture against Turkish attacks. In spring 1920, however, the Hellenic Army began its advance into the interior. Father Lefteris took part in many battles, not only as a priest fulfilling his religious duties and as a source of encouragement to the soldiers, but also as a combatant on the front line. During the Battle of Aslıhanlar–Dumlupınar, on 27 March 1921 (O.S.), the 34th Infantry Regiment fought to defend Dumlupınar near Afyonkarahisar, which caused a disorderly Turkish retreat towards Kütahya and enabled I Army Corps to reach Uşak, Noufrakis was seriously wounded in the leg. He was therefore transferred to Smyrna's 1st Military Hospital. After he had spent more than a month in hospital, his doctors decided to send him to Athens for further treatment. There, according to his unpublished handwritten Diary, "the surgeon Chrysospathis, with a large staff, using rubbing and electrical treatments ..." managed to improve his condition sufficiently for him to proceed to Edipsos for therapeutic baths.

A short time later, eager to return to the battlefield, he wrote:

"I left my crutches behind and took up my staff,
and, limping a little, set out to my honour,
to find my regiment and go to Ankara,
and never again to stray far from it."

"Thus I reached Smyrna and, reporting to the garrison headquarters, asked to depart immediately for my unit."

"They tried to turn me away, the poor fellows, and told me: Have pity on yourself,
your leg is not well—take pity on your youth ..."

In September 1921, despite the objections of garrison headquarters, Noufrakis rejoined the 34th Infantry Regiment on the front line. There he participated in the last major military operation in Asia Minor: the repulse by the Hellenic Army of a Turkish attack at Afyonkarahisar between 17 and 25 September 1921. He particularly distinguished himself during the capture of the height of İn Tepe.

In August 1922, Noufrakis witnessed the military defeat and ethnic cleansing endured by Hellenism in Asia Minor, and the collapse of Greece's Megali Idea, following the defeat at Ali Veran.

Turkish nationalist forces entered Smyrna on 9 September 1922 (27 August O.S.).

In the aftermath of the Greek defeat and the burning of Smyrna, Noufrakis left Ionia with the other Greek soldiers on 1 September 1922 O.S. (14 September N.S.). On his return to Greece, he immediately asked to go to the Evros region and join the units stationed there, as Eastern Thrace was also in danger of being lost. He was assigned to IV Army Corps. By then, however, the Entente's decisions had already been taken, and Eastern Thrace was surrendered without a fight. The Treaty of Lausanne was signed on 24 July 1923, establishing the international settlement after the war.

== Interbellum ==
After these events, Archimandrite Eleftherios Noufrakis returned to Athens. At his own request, he was appointed permanently as a military chaplain and preacher in the Hellenic Army. He served army units in greater Athens, conducting religious services and helping soldiers and others in need of spiritual and material assistance. He himself lived an extremely ascetic life in quarters provided for him within an army camp in the Ampelokipoi district.

On 14 October 1929 (Circular 462/1929), he "was voluntarily mobilised under Law 4191 and awarded a pension of a higher rank", a decision communicated to him on 1 November 1929 (protocol no. 226844/25.11.1919).

On 26 February 1934 he "was transferred to the status of compulsory retirement on grounds of physical fitness" (Law 5617, D.E.D. 1934, 26 February, Circular 161/34), with the rank of lieutenant colonel. He was then approximately sixty years old.

== Participation in the Greco-Italian War ==
Accounts of his later life describe him as deeply affected by the outcome of the Asia Minor campaign.

And yet, although Father Noufrakis was approaching the age of seventy when Italy declared war on Greece (28 October 1940), he did not remain inactive. Despite his age and poor health, he reported to the Athens garrison headquarters and asked to be recalled to service, sent to the front and assigned active duties. The officers responsible for mobilisation initially refused his request, evidently because of his health. After repeatedly requesting a posting, he was given permission to proceed.

In the mountains of Northern Epirus, Noufrakis conducted religious services and encouraged Greek soldiers. When circumstances demanded, he also fought alongside them as an ordinary soldier. But the hardships of the winter of 1940–1941 exceeded his endurance. He suffered severe frostbite, was withdrawn behind the lines and eventually returned to Athens, where he was hospitalised. Although Greek forces initially repelled the Italian invasion, Father Noufrakis saw the German occupiers enter Athens on 27 April 1941 and ultimately conquer Crete, despite its epic defence during the Battle of Crete (20–29 May), on 29 May 1941.

== Death ==
Bronze portrait of Archimandrite Eleftherios S. Noufrakis, part of the memorial to the fallen at Alones, Rethymno, Crete

Handwritten signature of Archimandrite Eleftherios S. Noufrakis

At every opportunity he proclaimed and preached that "every sacrifice waters the tree of struggle and freedom, which blossoms again to bear fruit anew", even as he himself endured unbearable sorrow. He participated in twenty-seven engagements between 1912 and 1922 and received military decorations. In 1941, nearly four months had passed since the Germans entered Athens, and his health was steadily deteriorating. He died in Athens on 5 August 1941, after a period of deteriorating health. His funeral service was held the following day, 6 August 1941, at the Church of Saint Therapon in Zografou, in the presence of his sisters Maria Alevizou-Alevyzaki and Despoina Kallitsounaki, and his nephews Father Iosif Noufrakis and Vardis Alevyzakis, as recorded in a death notice published by Akropolis on 6 August 1941.

Later, in accordance with his expressed wishes, his remains were taken to his birthplace, Alones, Rethymno, and interred beside those of his parents and siblings. Streets are named in his honour in the Tsesmes district of Rethymno and in Chania, where one runs perpendicular to Halidon Street beside the city's cathedral.

== Works ==
- Paisios S. Noufrakis, Archdeacon and Theologian, War Memoirs: A Brief Historical Account of What We Witnessed during the Greco-Turkish War and a Collection of Occasional Poems Inspired by Our Two Victorious Campaigns (Athens, 1914), dedicated "To the sacred memory of my much-beloved father Spyridon and mother Eleni" (original Greek title: Πολεμικαί Αναμνήσεις).
- P. G., Muse: On the Arrival of Archimandrite Eleftherios Noufrakis (Athens, 1919), printed by the Blazoudakis Brothers.

== Bibliography ==
- Clark, Bruce. Athens: City of Wisdom. Bloomsbury Publishing, 2021, p. 672. ISBN 9781788548137.
- Vakas, Dimitrios, lieutenant general. Ο Ελευθέριος Βενιζέλος πολεμικός ηγέτης – Ιστορικαί σελίδες από τη δημιουργία της Μεγάλης Ελλάδος 1910–1920 [Eleftherios Venizelos as a War Leader: Historical Pages from the Creation of Greater Greece, 1910–1920]. Athens, 1949. [In Greek.]
- Vastakis, Konstantinos, protopresbyter. Η προσφορά της Εκκλησίας στη δεκαετία του ΄40 [The Contribution of the Church in the 1940s]. Athens, 1996. [In Greek.]
- Vlavogilakis, Michail P. Εκκλησία και αγώνες της Κρήτης (1856–1905) [The Church and the Struggles of Crete (1856–1905)]. Chania, 2011. [In Greek.]
- Vovolinis, Konstantinos. Η Εκκλησία εις τον αγώνα της ελευθερίας [The Church in the Struggle for Freedom]. Athens, undated. [In Greek.]
- Hellenic Army General Staff, Military Archives Service. Certified photocopy of Archimandrite Eleftherios Noufrakis's military service certificate.
- Hellenic National Defence General Staff, Crete Conscription Service. Type A certificate, no. 148654/6 December 2012.
- Detorakis, Theocharis. Ιστορία της Κρήτης [History of Crete]. Athens, 1986. [In Greek.]
- Zampetakis, Emmanouil. Η Ιερά Μονή Προφήτη Ηλία Ρουστίκων [The Holy Monastery of Prophet Elijah at Roustika]. Amaltheia, 1973, no. 4. [In Greek.]
- Ιστορία του Ελληνικού Έθνους [History of the Greek Nation]. Ekdotiki Athinon, vols. XIV–XV, Athens, 1977. [In Greek.]
- Historical Archive of Crete, Chania (documents from 1866–1908 and laws of the Cretan State, nos. 81, 137, 208, 438, 561 and 749).
- I. I. N. Eleftherios Noufrakis [...], 3rd ed., Athens, 1969 (1st ed., Athens, 1942). [In Greek.]
- Kasimatis, P. Ιστορική Επισκόπησις της εν Κρήτη εκπαιδεύσεως [Historical Survey of Education in Crete]. Athens, 1953. [In Greek.]
- Centre for Cretan Culture. Η εθελοντική συμμετοχή των Κρητών στον Μακεδονικό Αγώνα 1903–1908 [The Voluntary Participation of Cretans in the Macedonian Struggle, 1903–1908]. Athens, 2003. [In Greek.]
- Kouraklis, Meletios, archimandrite. Θρησκευτικοί λειτουργοί στο στράτευμα δια μέσου των αιώνων [Religious Ministers in the Armed Forces through the Centuries]. Athens, 2010. [In Greek.]
- Kyriakou, Andreas. Λειτουργία στην Αγία Σοφία το Γενάρη του 1919 [Liturgy in Hagia Sophia in January 1919]. Patras, 1996, pp. 4–5 (reprinted from Orthodox Testimony, Cyprus). [In Greek.]
- Misailidis, Kostas. Πολεμικά Φύλλα από τη Μικρασιατικήν Εκστρατείαν [War Dispatches from the Asia Minor Campaign], first series. Athens, 1923. [In Greek.]
- Bereris, Dionysis. Η εκπαίδευση στο Αιτωλικό Αιτωλοακαρνανίας (1640–2012) [Education in Aitoliko, Aetolia-Acarnania (1640–2012)]. Athens, 2012. [In Greek.]
- Bournelis, Apostolos. Η Ορθόδοξη Μαρτυρία της Ιεράς Μονής Προφήτου Ηλία Ρουστίκων Ρεθύμνης [The Orthodox Witness of the Holy Monastery of Prophet Elijah at Roustika, Rethymno]. Heraklion, 1999. [In Greek.]
- Noufrakis, Paisios, archdeacon. Πολεμικαί Αναμνήσεις [War Memoirs]. Athens, 1914. [In Greek.]
- Panagiotakis, Georgios. Η οικουμενική Κωνσταντινούπολη και οι τελευταίοι Κρήτες υπερασπιστές της [Cosmopolitan Constantinople and Its Last Cretan Defenders]. Patris, 18 July 1911. [In Greek.]
- Papadakis, Chrysostomos, archimandrite. Κρήτες Μαθητές του Αγίου Νεκταρίου στη Ριζάρειο Εκκλησιαστική Σχολή [Cretan Students of Saint Nektarios at the Rizarios Ecclesiastical School]. Mesogeios, 1999, issue 8916. [In Greek.]
- Pelagidis, Efstathios. Μικρασιατικός και Ποντιακός Ελληνισμός [Hellenism in Asia Minor and Pontus]. Stamoulis Publications, Athens, 2004. [In Greek.]
- Alones Cultural Association O Kryoneritis. Calendars for 1999, 2000, 2001, 2002 and 2004. [In Greek.]
- Skoulatos, V.; Dimakopoulou, N.; Kondis, S. Ιστορία νεότερη και σύγχρονη [Modern and Contemporary History], vol. III. OEDB, Athens, 1984. [In Greek.]
- Stivaktakis, Antonios. Αρχιμανδρίτης Ελευθέριος Νουφράκης. Μια εμβληματική μορφή του Ελληνισμού [Archimandrite Eleftherios Noufrakis: An Emblematic Figure of Hellenism]. Alones Cultural Association O Kryoneritis, December 2015. ISBN 9786188181502. [In Greek.]
- Bareilles, Bertrand. Το Ανατολικό Ζήτημα – Από την Αθήνα στην Άγκυρα [The Eastern Question: From Athens to Ankara]. Heraklion, 2013 (1st ed., Paris, 1923). [In Greek translation.]
- Horton, George. Η Μάστιγα της Ασίας (1922) – Μικρασιατική Καταστροφή [The Blight of Asia (1922): The Asia Minor Catastrophe]. Special edition, Athens, 2009 (Estia Bookshop ed., 2007; first published in the United States in 1926 under the title The Blight of Asia). [In Greek translation.]
