= 34th Mechanized Infantry Brigade =

34th Mechanized Infantry Brigade "Colonel Dialetis Detachment"
- 34η Μηχανοκίνητη Ταξιαρχία ""Απόσπασμα Σχου Διαλέτη""
- Camp flag of the 34th Mechanized Infantry Brigade.
- Active: 1913–1941 ?–today
- Country: Greece
- Branch: Hellenic Army
- Type: Mechanized infantry
- Size: Brigade
- Part of: 2nd Mechanized Infantry Division
- Garrison/HQ: Assiros, Central Macedonia
- Mottos: Be invincible Ανίκητος εί Anikitos ei
- Engagements: Greco-Turkish War (1919-1922); Battle of Dumlupınar; Battle of the Sakarya; World War II; Greco-Italian War; Battle of Greece; Kosovo Force
- Decorations: Commanders Cross of the Cross of Valour

Commanders
- Notable commanders: Dimosthenis Dialetis

The 34th Mechanized Infantry Brigade (Greek: 34η Μηχανοποιημένη Ταξιαρχία Πεζικού,34η Μηχανοκίνητη Ταξιαρχία ""Απόσπασμα Σχου Διαλέτη" 34η M/K ΤΑΞ) is a mechanized infantry brigade of the Hellenic Army. It is headquartered in Assiros and subordinated to the 2nd Mechanized Infantry Division.

== History ==
The brigade traces its history to the 34th infantry Regiment (Greek: 34ο Σύνταγμα Πεζικού, 34ο ΣΠ), which was founded in December 1913 in Florina as a subunit of the 2nd Infantry Division.

The regiment distinguished itself in the Asia Minor Campaign and the Greco-Italian War, becoming one of a handful of units to receive twice the highest Greek award for valour, the Commander's Cross of the Cross of Valour. From June 1999 to January 2003, the brigade formed the bulk of the Greek element of KFOR. In June 2003, the brigade moved its base to Giannitsa.

In 2008, it received the honorary title "Colonel Dialetis Detachment" ("Απόσπασμα Σχου Διαλέτη") to commemorate the bravery of the 34th Regiment under Colonel Dimosthenis Dialetis in the aftermath of the second Battle of Dumlupınar in 26–29 March 1921. During the battle the 34th infantry regiment under Dialetis was ordered to hold the approaches at Dumlupınar at all costs and give time to the 1st Army Corps to retreat from Afyonkarahishar. The regiment faced off against 2 Turkish infantry divisions(4th and 11th) and routed them with heavy casualties. It successfully held the road open and the Corps managed to retreat and avoid encirclement and possible destruction. To this day the 34th brigade is the only unit of the modern Greek army that bears the name of its former commander.

As of 2011 the brigade is based at Assiros.

== Structure ==
- Command Company (ΙΣΤ)
- 34th Armored Battalion (34 ΕΜΑ)
- 501st Mechanized Infantry Battalion (501 M/K ΤΠ)
- 507th Mechanized Infantry Battalion (507 M/K ΤΠ)
- 108th Self Propelled Artillery Battalion (108 Μ Α/K ΠΒ)
- 34th Anti-tank Company (34 ΛΑΤ)
- 34th Engineer Company (34 ΛΜΧ)
- 34th Signal Company (34 ΛΔΒ)
- 34th Support Battalion (34 ΤΥΠ)
