= 23rd Armoured Brigade =

23rd Armoured Brigade may refer to:

- 23rd Armoured Brigade (Greece)
- 23rd Armoured Brigade (United Kingdom)

== See also ==
- 23rd Brigade (disambiguation)
