= 24th Armoured Brigade =

24th Armoured Brigade may refer to:

- 24th Armoured Brigade (Greece)
- 24th Armoured Brigade (United Kingdom)

== See also ==
- 24th Brigade (disambiguation)
