= 2nd Mechanized Infantry Division =

2nd Mechanized Infantry Division "ELASSON"
- 2η Μηχανοκίνητη Μεραρχία Πεζικού "ΕΛΑΣΣΩΝ"
- Emblem of the 2nd Mechanized Infantry Division
- Active: 1897–1941; 1945–today
- Country: Greece
- Branch: Hellenic Army
- Type: Mechanized infantry
- Size: Division
- Part of: First Army
- Garrison/HQ: Edessa, Macedonia
- Mottos: Even if only one stays alive ΕΣΤ' ΑΝ ΚΑΙ ΕΙΣ ΠΕΡΙΗ; Est' an ke is perii
- Engagements: Balkan Wars; First Balkan War; Second Balkan War; Russian Civil War; Allied intervention in the Russian Civil War; Southern Front; Southern Russia Intervention; Greco-Turkish War (1919–1922); Battle of the Sakarya; World War II; Battle of Greece; Greco-Italian War; Greek Civil War

The 2nd Mechanized Infantry Division is a mechanized infantry division of the Hellenic Army.

== History ==
The 2nd Infantry Division was established in the aftermath of the disastrous Greco-Turkish War of 1897 by Royal Decree on 24 October 1897. Based at Athens, it comprised the 3rd Infantry Brigade at with 1st and 7th Infantry Regiments, and the 4th Infantry Brigade with 8th and 9th Infantry Regiments. The two existing divisions were then abolished on 1 August 1900 as part of a general restructuring, and three new divisions were ordered established a month later. 2nd Division, still at Athens, now comprised 3rd Brigade (Athens) with the 1st and 7th Regiments, and 4th Brigade (Chalkis) with the 2nd and 5th Infantry Regiments, as well as the 2nd Cavalry Regiment, the 2nd Artillery Regiment, and the 2nd Evzone Battalion.

On 9 September 1904, as part of another reorganization, the 4th Brigade was moved to Nafplio and now comprised the 8th and 11th Regiments, while the 3rd Brigade remained as it was. In addition, the division now comprised the 1st and 2nd Evzone Battalions, the 2nd Cavalry Regiment, 2nd Field Artillery Regiment, 2nd Engineers Battalion, 2nd Train Company and 2nd Nursing Company, and the 2nd Military Music Command. Most of these support units were based at Athens.

In January 1912, the brigades were abolished and divisions organized as triangular divisions. The Division remained at Athens, but now comprised 1st and 7th Regiments at Athens and the 3rd Infantry Regiment at Chalkis, plus supporting units.

In 1998, the division was directly subordinate to the II Army Corps. It comprised the 33rd and 34th Brigades, both mechanised. Both were equipped with M-113s and Leopard MBTs. In 2014 the 24th Armored Brigade was transferred to the 2nd Mechanized Infantry Division, which in its current form with three brigades is the strategic reserve of the Hellenic Army.

== Structure ==
2nd Mechanized Division locations

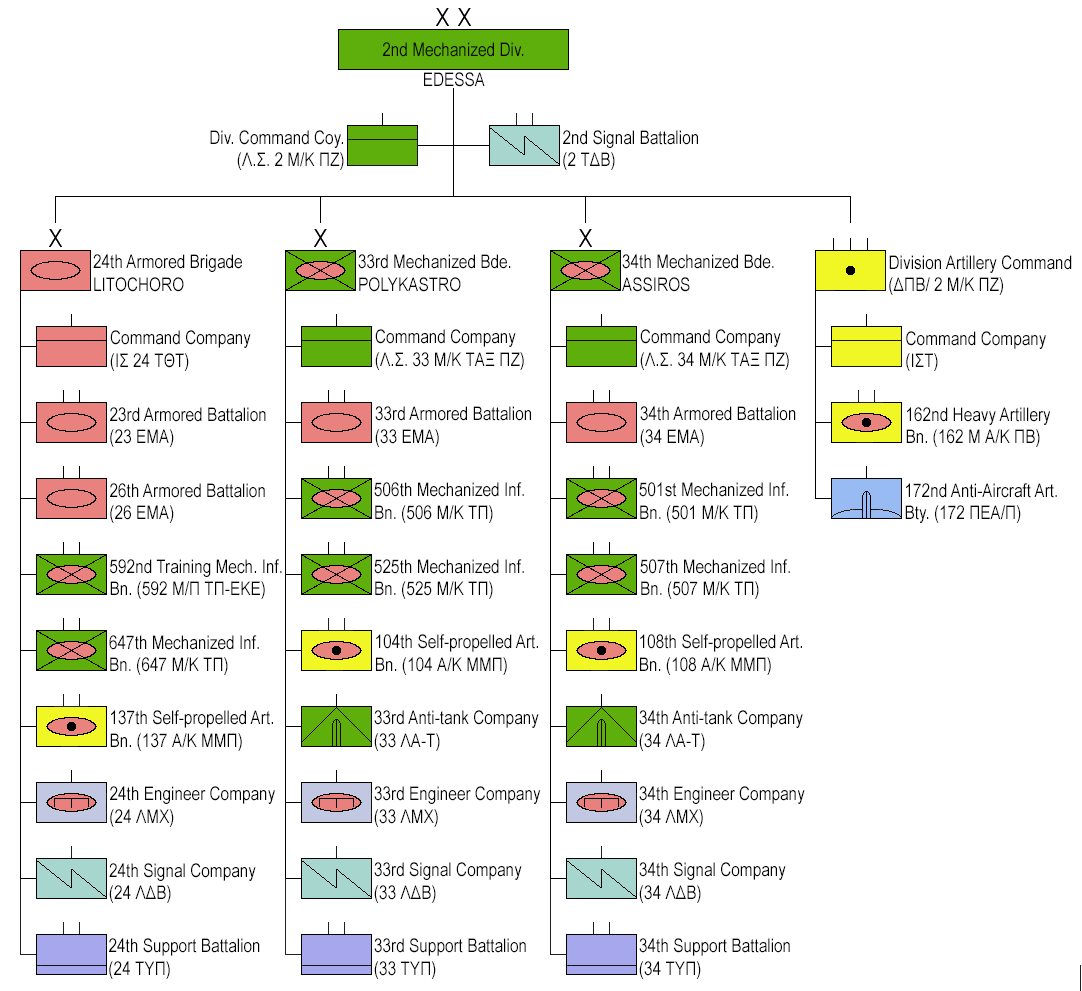
2nd Mechanized Division organization 2025

- 2nd Mechanized Division (II Μ/Κ ΜΠ) based at Edessa (Central Macedonia)
  - Division Command Company (ΛΣ/ΙΙ Μ/Κ ΜΠ)
  - 24th Armored Brigade "1st Cavalry Regiment - Florina", in Litochoro, (Central Macedonia)
  - 33rd Mechanized Brigade, in Polykastro, (Central Macedonia)
  - 34th Mechanized Brigade, in Assiros, (Central Macedonia)
  - Division Artillery Command (ΔΠΒ/ΙΙ Μ/Κ ΜΠ)
  - 2nd Signal Battalion (2ο ΤΔΒ)
