= 25th Armoured Brigade =

25th Armoured Brigade may refer to:

- 25th Armoured Brigade (Greece)
- 25th Armoured Engineer Brigade Royal Engineers
- 25th Army Tank Brigade, United Kingdom

== See also ==
- 25th Brigade (disambiguation)
