= Ministry of Maritime Affairs =

Ministry of Maritime Affairs may refer to:

- Ministry of Maritime Affairs (Pakistan)
- Ministry of Maritime Affairs (Portugal)
- Ministry of Maritime Affairs, Islands and Fisheries (Greece)
- Ministry of Maritime Affairs, Transport and Infrastructure, Croatia

== See also ==
- Ministry for Naval Affairs (disambiguation)
