= 20th Armoured Division (Greece) =

20th Armoured Division "Macedonia"
- 20ή Τεθωρακισμένη Μεραρχία «ΜΑΚΕΔΟΝΙΑ»
- Camp flag of the 20th Armoured Division
- Active: 1956–today
- Country: Greece
- Branch: Hellenic Army
- Type: Armoured
- Size: Division
- Part of: IV Army Corps
- Garrison/HQ: Kavala, Macedonia
- Mottos: In The Shade; ΥΠΟ ΣΚΙΗ; Ipo Skii

The 20th Armoured Division "Macedonia" (Greek: 20ή Τεθωρακισμένη Μεραρχία «Μακεδονία» Ikosti Tethorakimeni Merarhia «MAKEDONIA», abbrev. XX ΤΘΜ) of the Hellenic Army is headquartered in Kavala, Macedonia. It is the Army's only armoured division.

== History ==
The Hellenic Army's first attempt to form an armoured/mechanized division was the 19th Mechanized Division in early 1941, which was destroyed during the German invasion of Greece. These efforts were resumed after Liberation, with mechanized units being established in 1945 and fighting in the Greek Civil War of 1946–49. The same period saw also the arrival of the first true tanks in Greece, the British Centaur tanks, which only began to be employed in 1947. From 1950 on, the Hellenic Army began receiving M24 Chaffee tanks and M18 Hellcat tank destroyers.

In 1954, 9th Infantry Division was converted into an armoured division, comprising two Battle Commands (Διοικήσεις Μάχης, ΔΜΑ). Due to the severe lack of tanks and other armoured vehicles, the division was armoured in name only. In 1956 the 9th Armoured Division was converted into the 20th Armoured Division, which was gradually formed over the next four years. With the arrival of the first M47 Patton tanks in 1957, the first Medium Tank Battalions (Επιλαρχίες Μέσων Αρμάτων, ΕΜΑ) of 55 tanks each, were formed.

From 1964, the division began receiving the first M48 Patton tanks and M113 armoured personnel carriers, which began replacing older material. By 1971, sufficient numbers of M48 tanks had arrived so that three new Medium Tank Battalions, 24th, 25th, and 26th, could be established so that each Battle Command comprised two Medium Tank Battalions. In 1977–79, the Battle Commands were formed into independent Armoured Brigades, with 3rd Battle Command forming the 23rd Armoured Brigade, 1st Battle Command forming the 24th Armoured Brigade, and 2nd Battle Command forming the 25th Armoured Brigade. 20th Division remained as an operational headquarters coordinating the latter two brigades. In 1985, 25th Armoured Brigade passed directly under IV Army Corps, and was replaced by 22nd Armoured Brigade.

== Structure (2016) ==
Locations of 20th Armoured Division units

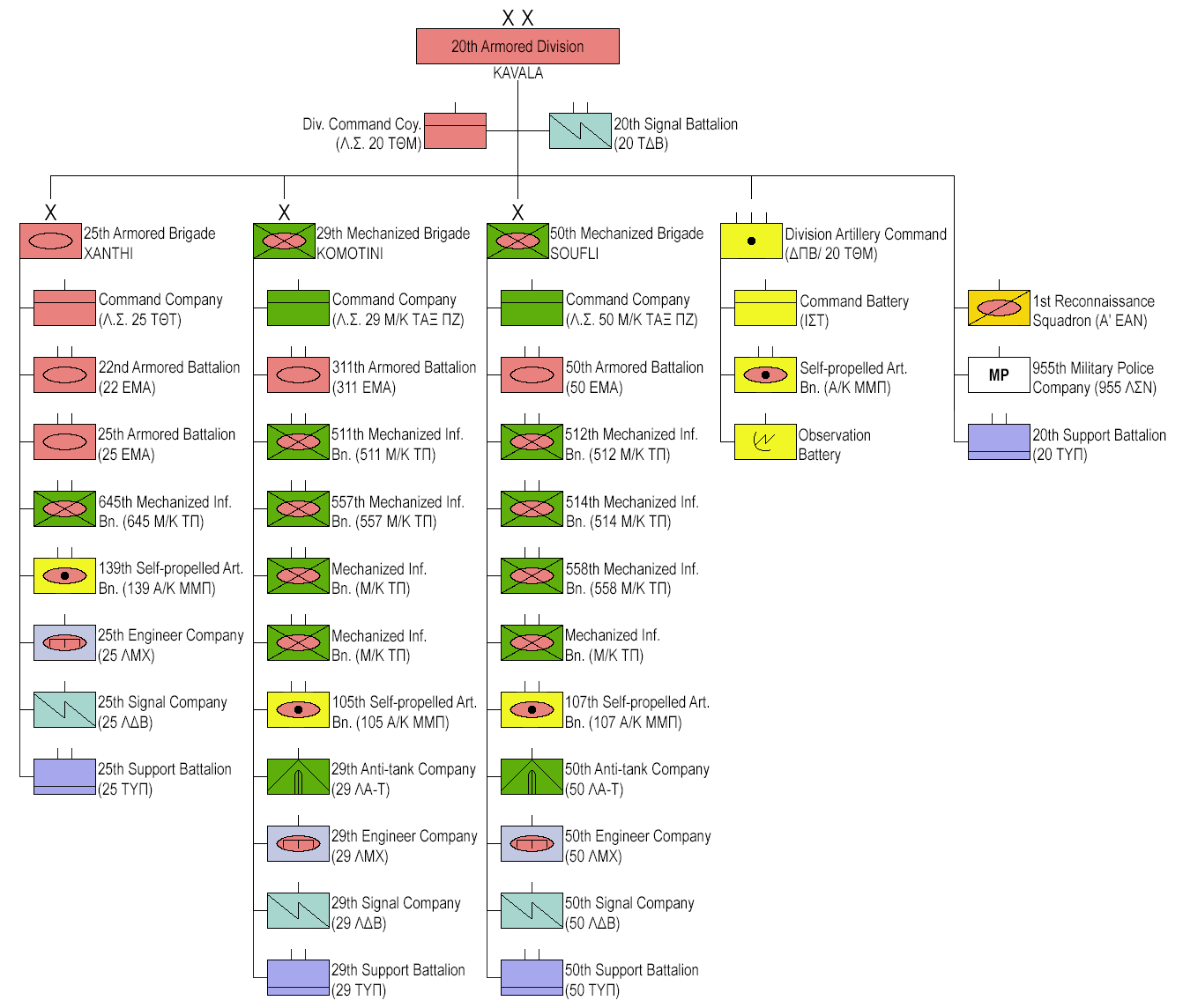
Structure of the 20th Armoured Division

- Division HQ Company (ΙΣ/ΧΧ ΤΘΜ)
- 20th Signal Company (20ο ΛΔΒ)
- 955th Military Police Company (ΛΣΤ)
- Division Artillery Command (ΔΠΒ/ΧΧ ΤΘΜ)
- 21st Armoured Brigade, based at Komotini, Thrace
  - HQ Company (ΙΣ/ΧΧΙ ΤΘΤ)
  - 211 Medium Tank Battalion (211η ΕΜΑ)
  - 212 Medium Tank Battalion (212η ΕΜΑ)
  - 646th Mechanized Infantry Battalion (646ο M/K ΤΠ)
  - 140th Self Propelled Artillery Battalion (140η Μ Α/K ΠΒ)
  - 21st Engineer Company (21 ΛΜΧ)
  - 21st Signal Company (21 ΛΔΒ)
  - 21st Support Battalion (21 ΤΥΠ)
- 23rd Armoured Brigade, based at Alexandroupoli, Thrace
  - HQ Company (ΙΣ/ΧΧΙΙΙ ΤΘΤ)
  - 21st Medium Tank Battalion (21η ΕΜΑ)
  - 24th Medium Tank Battalion (24η ΕΜΑ)
  - 644th Mechanized Infantry Battalion (644ο M/K ΤΠ)
  - 138th Self Propelled Artillery Battalion (138η Μ Α/K ΠΒ)
  - 23rd Engineer Company (23ος ΛΜΧ)
  - 23rd Signal Company (23ος ΛΔΒ)
  - 23rd Support Battalion (23ο ΤΥΠ)
- 25th Armoured Brigade, based at Xanthi, Thrace
  - HQ Company (ΙΣ/XXV ΤΘΤ)
  - 22nd Medium Tank Battalion (22η ΕΜΑ)
  - 25th Medium Tank Battalion (25η ΕΜΑ)
  - 645th Mechanized Infantry Battalion (645ο M/K ΤΠ)
  - 139th Self Propelled Artillery Battalion (139η Μ Α/K ΠΒ)
  - 25th Engineer Company (25ος ΛΜΧ)
  - 25th Signal Company (25ος ΛΔΒ)
  - 25th Support Battalion (25ο ΤΥΠ)

== Emblem and motto ==
The emblem depicts a Centaur ready to fire an arrow. The body of the horse symbolizes strength and aggressiveness of armor/cavalry, and the human body symbolizes the soldier who controls the vehicle and directs the weapon.

The motto of the 20th Armored Division is "In The Shade" (Greek: Υπό σκιή, Ypo Skii). The phrase is attributed to the Spartan soldier Dienekes, who on the eve of the Battle of Thermopylae, was told by a native of Trachis that the Persian archers were so numerous that their arrows would block out the sun. Dienekes replied with a laugh, "Good. Then we will fight in the shade."

== Sources ==
- Hellenic Army General Staff, Training Directorate/3a (March 1995). Ιστορία Ιππικού - Τεθωρακισμένων [History of the Cavalry–Armour]. Athens: Hellenic Army Printing Office.
