= 33rd Mechanized Infantry Brigade (Greece) =

33rd Mechanized Infantry Brigade "Kydoniai Regiment"
- 33η Μηχανοκίνητη Ταξιαρχία "Σύνταγμα Κυδωνίαι"
- Camp flag of the 33rd Mechanized Infantry Brigade
- Country: Greece
- Branch: Hellenic Army
- Type: Mechanized infantry
- Size: Brigade
- Part of: 2nd Mechanized Infantry Division
- Garrison/HQ: Polykastro, Macedonia
- Mottos: Not even Hades can touch the invincible ones Ανίκητων άπτεται ουδ' Αϊδης; Anikiton aptete oud' Aidis

The 33rd Mechanized Infantry Brigade "Kydoniai Regiment" (Greek: 33η Μηχανοκίνητη Ταξιαρχία "Σύνταγμα Κυδωνίαι" is a unit of the Hellenic Army based in Polykastro, Macedonia.

== Structure ==
- Command Company (ΙΣΤ)
- 33rd Armored Battalion (33 ΕΜΑ)
- 506th Mechanized Infantry Battalion (506 M/K ΤΠ)
- 525th Mechanized Infantry Battalion (525 M/K ΤΠ)
- 104th Self Propelled Artillery Battalion (104 Α/K ΜΜΠ)
- 33rd Anti-tank Company (33 ΛΑΤ)
- 33rd Engineer Company (33 ΛΜΧ)
- 33rd Signal Company (33 ΛΔΒ)
- 33rd Support Battalion (33 ΤΥΠ)
