= Navy Department =

Navy Department or Department of the Navy may refer to:

- United States Department of the Navy
- Navy Department (Ministry of Defence), in the United Kingdom, 1964–1997
- Confederate States Department of the Navy, 1861–1865
- Department of the Navy (Australia), 1939–1973

== See also ==
- Department of Naval Services, in Canada, 1910–1922
- Ministry of the Navy (disambiguation)
