= Ministry of the Military =

Military of the Military may refer to:

- Ministry of Military Affairs (Poland), a Polish government ministry during the Second Polish Republic and World War II
- Ministry of War (imperial China) (兵部), a Chinese government ministry between the Sui and Qing dynasties
- Ministry of Military (Korean Empire) (軍部), a Korean government ministry between the late Joseon and Imperial Korean periods
- Ministry of War (pre-modern Japan) (兵部省), a Japanese government ministry between the Asuka and Meiji periods
- Ministry of the Army (陸軍省), a Japanese government ministry that replaced the pre-modern Ministry of War in 1872

== See also ==
- Ministry of War (disambiguation)
- Ministry of the Navy (disambiguation)
