= Examili =

Examili Εξαμίλι
- Settlement
- Location within Greece
- Coordinates: 40°51.9′N 23°0.35′E
- Country: Greece
- Administrative region: Central Macedonia
- Regional unit: Thessaloniki
- Municipality: Lagkadas
- Municipal unit: Assiros
- Community: Assiros
- Elevation: 250 m (820 ft)

Population (2021)
  - Total: 194
- Time zone: UTC+2 (EET)
  - Summer (DST): UTC+3 (EEST)
- Postal code: 572 00
- Area code: +30-2394
- Vehicle registration: NA to NX

Examili (Greek: Εξαμίλι or Εξαμήλι) is a village and a community of the Lagkadas municipality. Before the 2011 local government reform, it was part of the municipality of Assiros. The 2021 census recorded 194 inhabitants in the village. Examili is a part of the community of Assiros.

== See also ==
- List of settlements in the Thessaloniki regional unit
