= Dimosthenis Dialetis =

- Δημοσθένης Διαλέτης
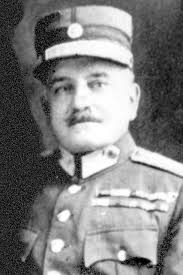
- Dialetis c. 1928
- Born: 1869; Dervista, Aetolia-Acarnania, Kingdom of Greece
- Died: 1954; Kingdom of Greece
- Military career
- Allegiance: Kingdom of Greece; Second Hellenic Republic
- Branch: Hellenic Army; Hellenic Gendarmerie
- Rank: Lieutenant General
- Commands: 34th Infantry Regiment; Chief of the Hellenic Gendarmerie
- Conflicts: Greco-Turkish War (1897); Balkan Wars; First Balkan War; Second Balkan War; World War I; Macedonian front; Greco-Turkish War (1919-1922); Battle of Aslıhanlar–Dumlupınar
- Other work: Deputy Minister of National Defence

Dimosthenis Dialetis (Greek: Δημοσθένης Διαλέτης; 1869–1954) was a Greek soldier who rose to the rank of lieutenant general.

Born in Dervista, Aetolia-Acarnania, Dimosthenis Dialetis enlisted in the Hellenic Army on 23 September 1885, enrolling in the NCO preparatory school, from which he graduated as a sergeant on 23 July 1887. After attending the NCO officer academy and being commissioned as an infantry second lieutenant on 10 August 1901.

He fought in the Greco-Turkish War of 1897, the Balkan Wars of 1912–13, the Macedonian front of World War I, and the Asia Minor Campaign, being promoted to lieutenant in 1909, captain in 1912, major in 1914, lieutenant colonel in 1917, and colonel in 1919. He particularly distinguished himself for his bravery and leadership as commander of the 34th Infantry Regiment in the Battle of Aslıhanlar–Dumlupınar, fighting off the attacks of three Turkish divisions for two days. For his bravery, he was promoted to major general in 1923. In 1928 he was promoted to lieutenant general, assuming the position of Chief of the Greek Gendarmerie.

In 1929, he retired from service on his request. He briefly served as Deputy Minister of National Defence in the collaborationist government of Ioannis Rallis in 1943, during the Axis occupation of Greece. He died in 1954, at the age of 85.
