= 24th Armoured Brigade (Greece) =

- XXIV Τεθωρακισμένη Ταξιαρχία «1ο ΣΙ ΦΛΩΡΙΝΑ»
- Camp flag of the 24th Armoured Brigade
- Active: 1960–present
- Country: Greece
- Branch: Hellenic Army
- Type: Armoured
- Size: Brigade
- Part of: 2nd Mechanized Infantry Division
- Garrison/HQ: Litochoro, Macedonia
- Mottos: I will not disgrace my weapons Ου καταισχύνω όπλα Ou kateskhino opla

The 24th Armoured Brigade "1st Cavalry Regiment Florina" (Greek: XXIV Τεθωρακισμένη Ταξιαρχία «1ο ΣΙ ΦΛΩΡΙΝΑ») is an armoured brigade of the Hellenic Army, based at Litochoro and subordinated to the 2nd Mechanized Infantry Division.

== History ==
It was founded in July 1960 at Thessaloniki as the 1st Battle Command of the 20th Armoured Division. In September 1971 it was moved to Litochoro and was constituted as an independent Armoured brigade on 1 January 1979. In December 2000, it received the honorary title "1st Cavalry Regiment Florina", continuing the tradition of the 1st Cavalry Regiment. From 1 April 2004 until 26 September 2005 it was subordinated to the 2nd Mechanized Infantry Division, and since then it belongs to I Army Corps. In 2014 the brigade came under the 2nd Mechanized Infantry Division.

== Structure ==
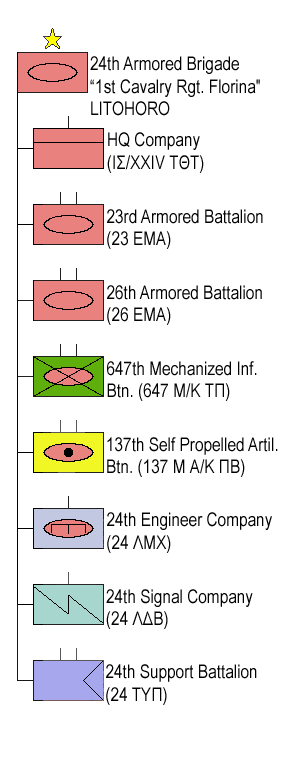
Structure 24th Armoured Brigade

24th Armoured Brigade in Litochoro, Macedonia

- Command Company (ΙΣΤ)
- 23rd Armoured Battalion (23 ΕΜΑ)
- 26th Armoured Battalion (26 ΕΜΑ)
- 647 Mechanized Infantry Battalion (647 M/K ΤΠ)
- 137 Self Propelled Artillery Battalion (137 Μ Α/K ΠΒ)
- 24th Engineer Company (24 ΛΜΧ)
- 24th Signal Company (24 ΛΔΒ)
- 24th Support Battalion (24 ΕΥΠ)
