= Battle of Aslıhanlar–Dumlupınar =

Battles of the Greco-Turkish War

- Part of the Greco-Turkish War (1919–1922)
- Prime Minister of Greece Dimitrios Gounaris and Minister of Military Affairs Nikolaos Theotokis, with the Commanders of the Army of Asia Minor and the I Army Corps, Anastasios Papoulas and Alexandros Kontoulis, at Dumlupınar, during Greek Easter (c. April–May 1921).
Date	8–15 April 1921 (N.S.); 26 March–2 April 1921 (O.S.)
Location	Aslıhanlar and Dumlupınar, Kütahya Province, Turkey
Result	Greek victory
Territorial changes	Greek forces gain control of the strategic Toklusivrisi and Bakırcık positions

Belligerents
Kingdom of Greece	Ankara Government

Commanders and leaders
Anastasios Papoulas; Alexandros Kontoulis; Dimosthenis Dialetis; Nikolaos Plastiras	Refet Pasha; Fahrettin Pasha

Units involved
I Army Corps; 5/42 Evzone Regiment	Southern Front Command; XII Corps

Strength
34,000 troops 19,000 rifles 70 artillery pieces	36,000 troops 22,000 rifles 70 artillery pieces

Casualties and losses
47 killed 544 wounded	400 killed 800 wounded 4,000 deserters

The Battle of Aslıhanlar–Dumlupınar was fought between 8 and 15 April 1921 near Dumlupınar, during the Greco-Turkish War (1919–1922). The battle followed the Second Battle of İnönü and involved a Turkish offensive under Refet Pasha against the Greek I Army Corps, commanded by Alexandros Kontoulis.

The Greek forces successfully repulsed all Turkish attacks, retaining their defensive positions at Dumlupınar. The battle ended with the Greeks holding the tactical advantage and driving out the Turks from some strategic positions.

== Background ==
In March 1921, the Greek Army of Asia Minor launched simultaneous offensives toward Eskişehir in the north and Afyonkarahisar in the south, in what is today known as the First Battle of İnönü and the Second Battle of İnönü. While the Greek offensive was halted there, Greek I Corps captured Afyonkarahisar on 28 March after overcoming Turkish resistance around Dumlupınar. The withdrawal of the northern Greek forces exposed the I Corps to a possible Turkish attack against its flank and rear.

Kontoulis withdrew from Afyonkarahisar toward Dumlupınar, leaving rearguard forces to cover the movement, in order to avoid being encircled. The Turkish high command decided to exploit this withdrawal by transferring reinforcements from the İnönü front to Refet Pasha's Southern Front Command. Refet intended to cut the Greek communications with Uşak and destroy I Corps before it could establish a new defensive line.

== Battle ==
The battle began on 8 April, when Refet's troops advanced against Greek positions around Aslıhanlar, north of Dumlupınar. The Greek rearguard, including the 34th Infantry Regiment under Colonel Dimosthenis Dialetis, successfully resisted the Turkish attacks and covered the withdrawal of the main Greek forces. The fighting continued until 12 April, when the Greeks withdrew from their advanced positions to the stronger defensive line at Dumlupınar. Refet interpreted the withdrawal as evidence of a Turkish victory and reported it as such to Ankara. However, the Greek troops had not actually been defeated and continued to hold the principal defensive positions. Refet subsequently ordered another offensive, intending to dislodge the Greeks from Dumlupınar and pursue them with his cavalry.

Between 13 and 15 April, Refet's Turkish forces launched further attacks against the Greek positions. By this stage, Refet commanded eight infantry divisions, although many were depleted and exhausted from previous battles. His 1st and 2nd Cavalry Divisions had been sent on a wide movement toward the Banaz District, where they were unable to contribute effectively to the main engagement.

The Turkish attacks encountered strong Greek resistance and failed to break through. Greek forces, including the detachments commanded by Dialetis, as well as the 5/42 Evzone Regiment commanded by Nikolaos Plastiras, succeeded in maintaining their positions and preventing the encirclement of the I Corps. After sustaining considerable losses, Refet abandoned the offensive and withdrew his forces to positions northeast of Dumlupınar. The Greek Army gained control of Toklusivrisi, a strategically important military point, driving out the Turkish 41st Division, and also drove out the Turkish XII Corps to the Bakırcık heights and even farther south.

== Aftermath ==
Refet Pasha's failed operations caused the reorganization of the Turkish western armies and also severely damaged his own standing and reputation amongst the commanders. In May 1921, the Ankara government decided to abolish Refet's Southern Front Command and place its forces under İsmet Pasha. Refet was recalled to Ankara, although he later returned to senior government office. Mustafa Kemal also criticized Refet in Nutuk for declaring victory, despite the failure of his attacks and the fact that Greek forces had successfully established themselves at Dumlupınar, while Refet's troops had, instead, withdrawn after suffering substantial losses. On the other side, Dialetis was promoted to major general for gallantry in action.

Military historian Vasileios Loumiotis criticized Kontoulis for establishing his headquarters at Uşak rather than remaining at Dumlupınar to direct the fighting and credited the resistance of Dialetis with saving the Greek I Corps from destruction and ensuring the Greek victory. On the contrary, military historian Edward J. Erickson praised Kontoulis for maintaining "excellent command and control of his corps" during the battle, despite the vulnerable position of his forces.

Both armies continued their preparations for renewed operations, which culminated in the Battle of Kütahya–Eskişehir in July 1921.
