= 2nd Cavalry Regiment (Greece) =

- Active: 1885–1937
- Country: Greece
- Branch: Hellenic Army
- Type: Cavalry
- Engagements: Greco-Turkish War of 1897, Asia Minor Campaign

The 2nd Cavalry Regiment (Greek: 2° Σύνταγμα Ιππικού) was a historic cavalry regiment of the Hellenic Army.

== History ==
The 2nd Cavalry Regiment was established in 1885, when the extant three hipparchies were reorganized and renamed into regiments of four cavalry companies each. It participated in the Greco-Turkish War of 1897 in Thessaly, as well as in the Asia Minor Campaign, where it distinguished itself in the capture of the Nea Ephesos (Kuşadası) – Sokia (Söke) area in April 1922. After the war, it remained active, garrisoned in various areas of Thessaly and Macedonia, until its disbandment in 1937.

In January 2001, the honorific title "2nd Cavalry Regiment - Ephesos" was awarded to the 25th Armoured Brigade.
