= 25th Armoured Brigade (Greece) =

25th Armoured Brigade "2nd Cavalry Regiment - Ephesus"
- XXV Τεθωρακισμένη Ταξιαρχία «2ο ΣΙ - Έφεσσος»
- Formation flag of the 25th Armoured Brigade
- Active: 1979–today
- Country: Greece
- Branch: Hellenic Army
- Type: Armoured
- Size: 5 Battalions
- Part of: 20th Armoured Division, IV Army Corps
- Garrison/HQ: Xanthi, Thrace
- Motto(s): "Die for the fatherland"

The 25th Armoured Brigade "2nd Cavalry Regiment - Ephesus" (Greek: XXV Τεθωρακισμένη Ταξιαρχία «2ο ΣΙ - Έφεσσος») is an armoured brigade of the Hellenic Army.

== History ==
The 25th Armoured Brigade traces its origin to the 20th Armoured Division's 2nd Battle Command (2η Διοίκηση Μάχης, 2η ΔΜΑ), created in June–July 1959 at Thessaloniki. In July 1974, following the crisis with Turkey as a result of the Turkish invasion of Cyprus, the unit moved to the area of Xanthi, where it has remained since. In January 1979, the 2nd Battle Command was reorganized as an armoured brigade, and received its present name. It remained an integral part of the 20th Armoured Division until 2013, when it passed directly to IV Army Corps control, but remaining under the disposal of the 20th Division.

In January 2001, the brigade received the honorific designation "2nd Cavalry Regiment - Ephesus" in honour of the historic 2nd Cavalry Regiment, which distinguished itself during the Greco-Turkish War of 1919–1922.

== Structure ==
- HQ Company (ΙΣ/XXV ΤΘΤ)
- 22 Armoured Battalion (22 ΕΜΑ)
- 25 Armoured Battalion (25 ΕΜΑ)
- 645 Mechanized Infantry Battalion (645 M/K ΤΠ)
- 139 Self Propelled Artillery Battalion (139 Α/Κ ΜΜΠ)
- 25 Engineer Company (25 ΛΜΧ)
- 25 Signal Company (25 ΛΔΒ)
- 25 Support Battalion (25 ΕΥΠ)

== Gallery ==
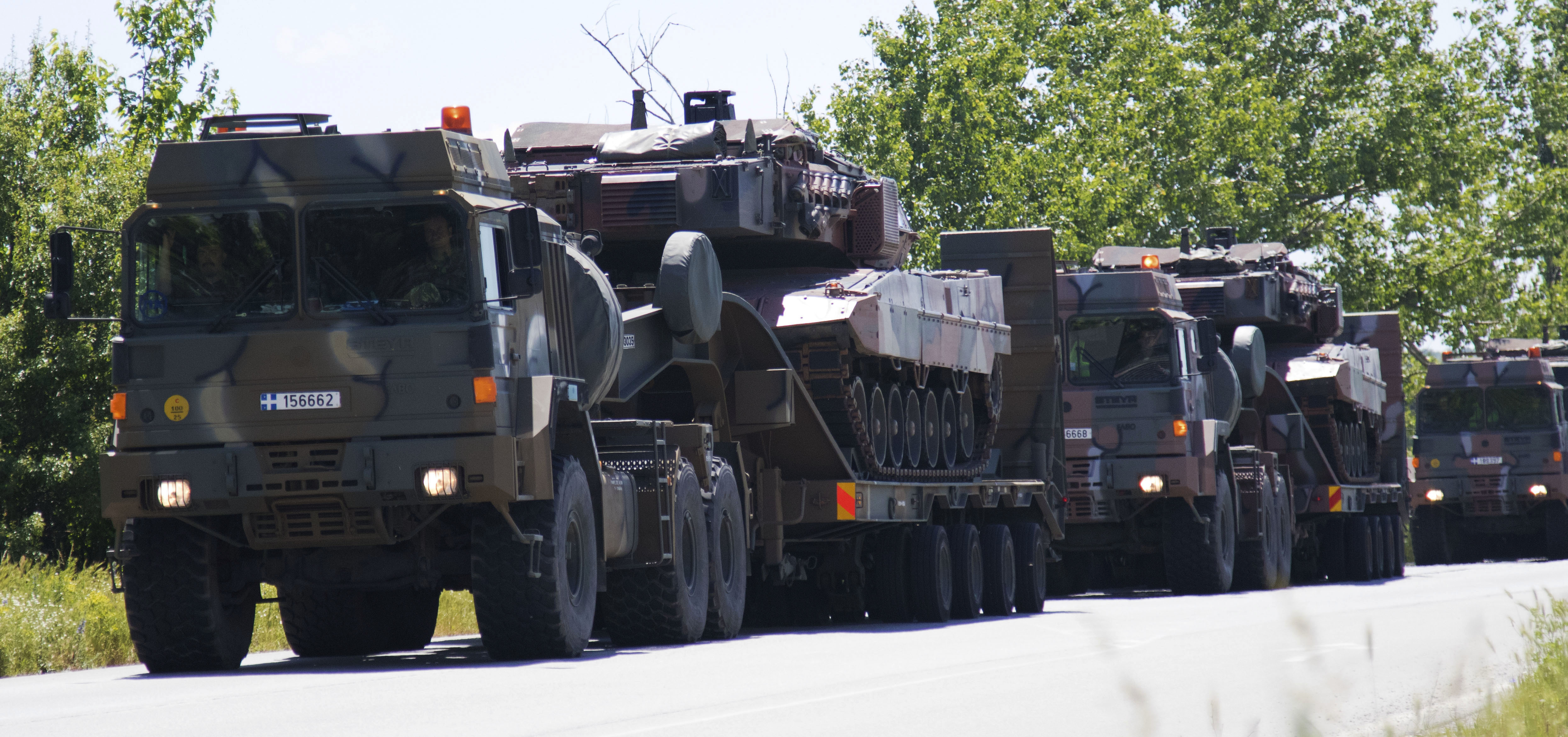
MAN 40.633 FX DFAETX tank transporter

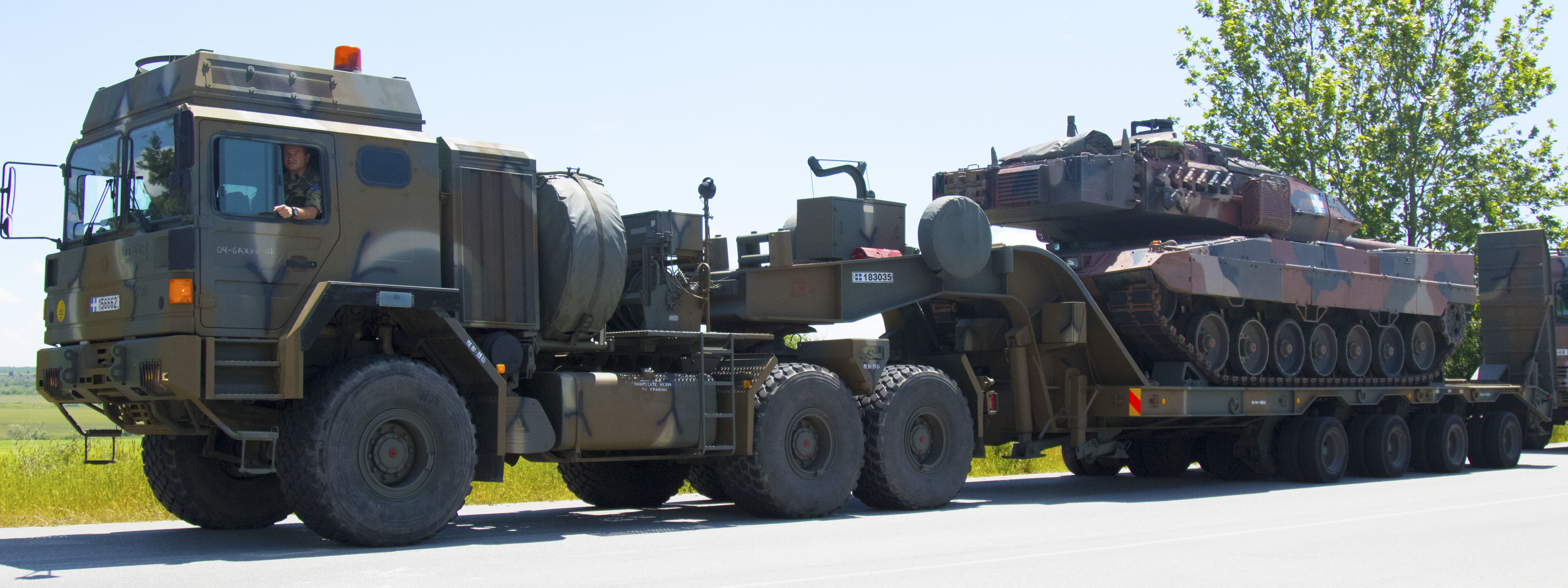

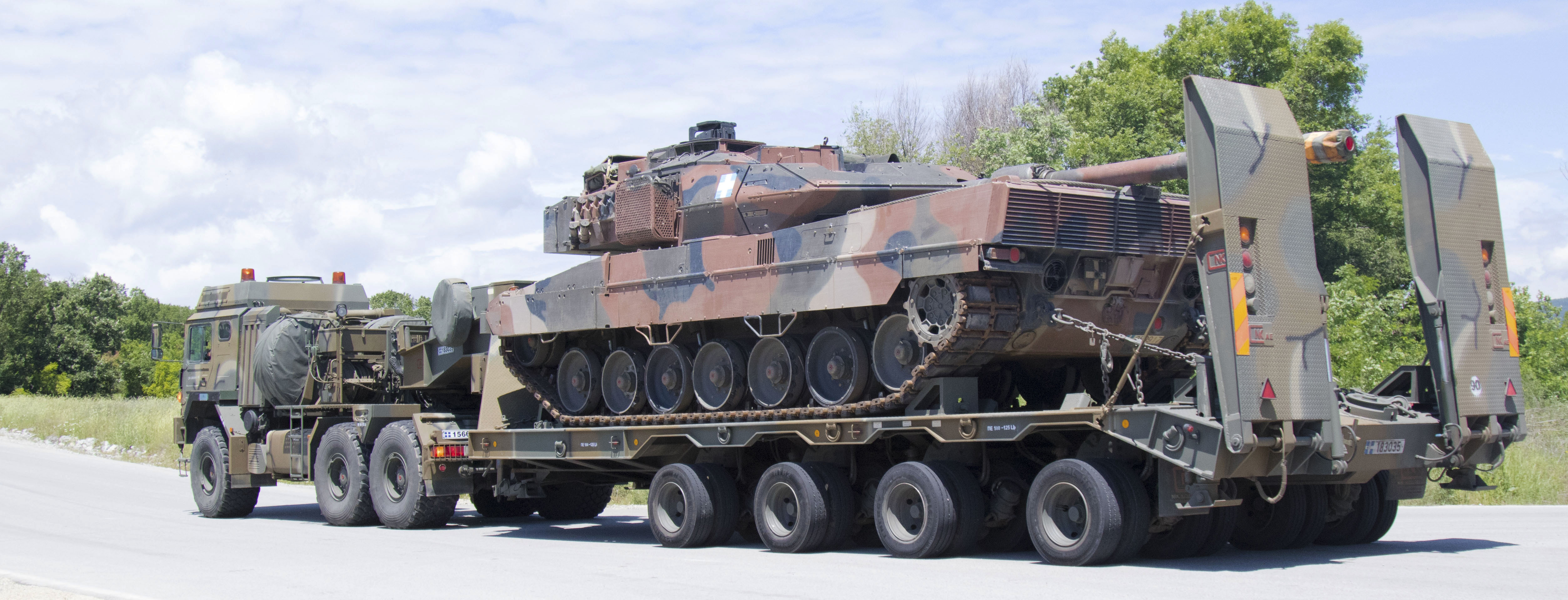

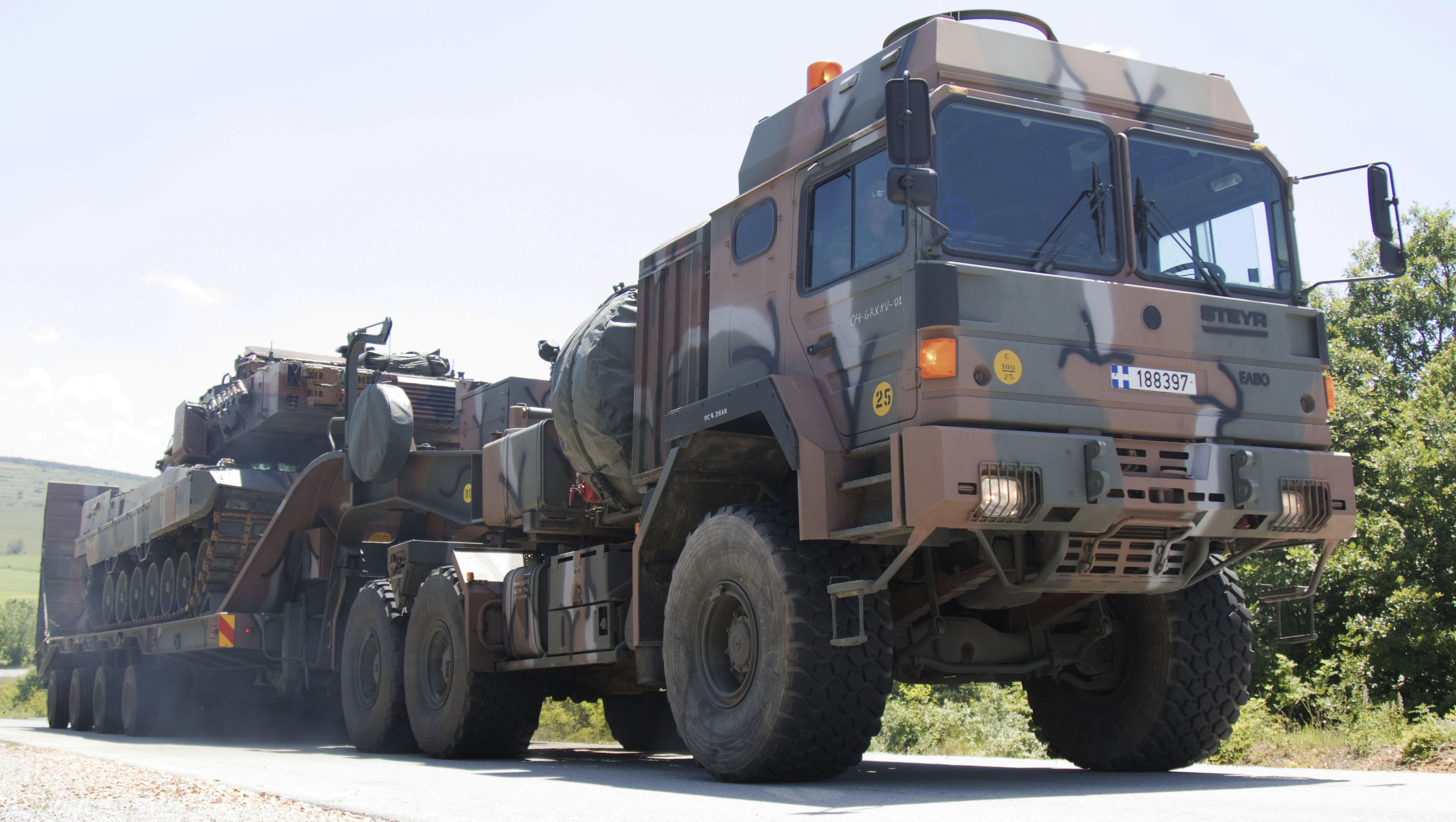

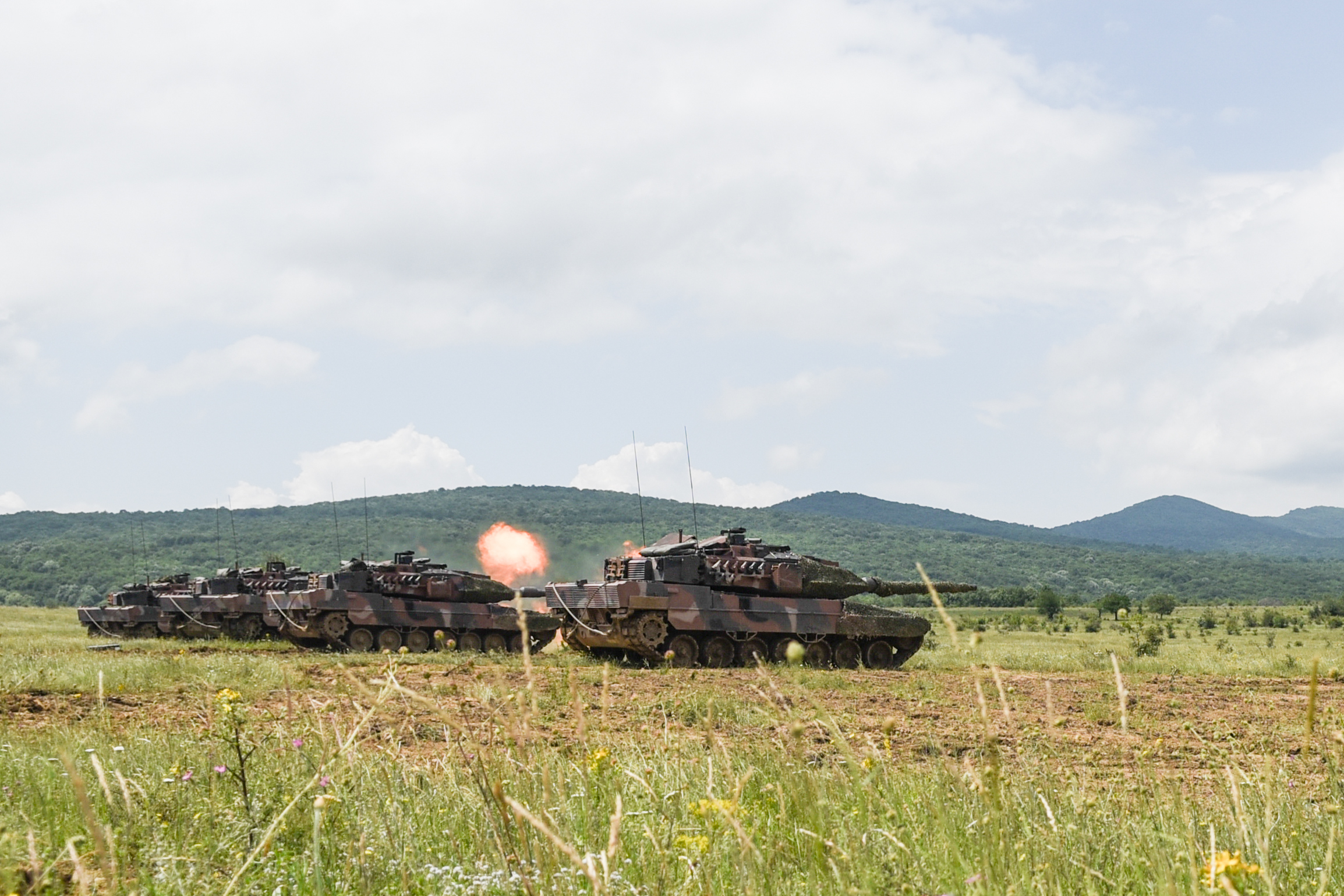

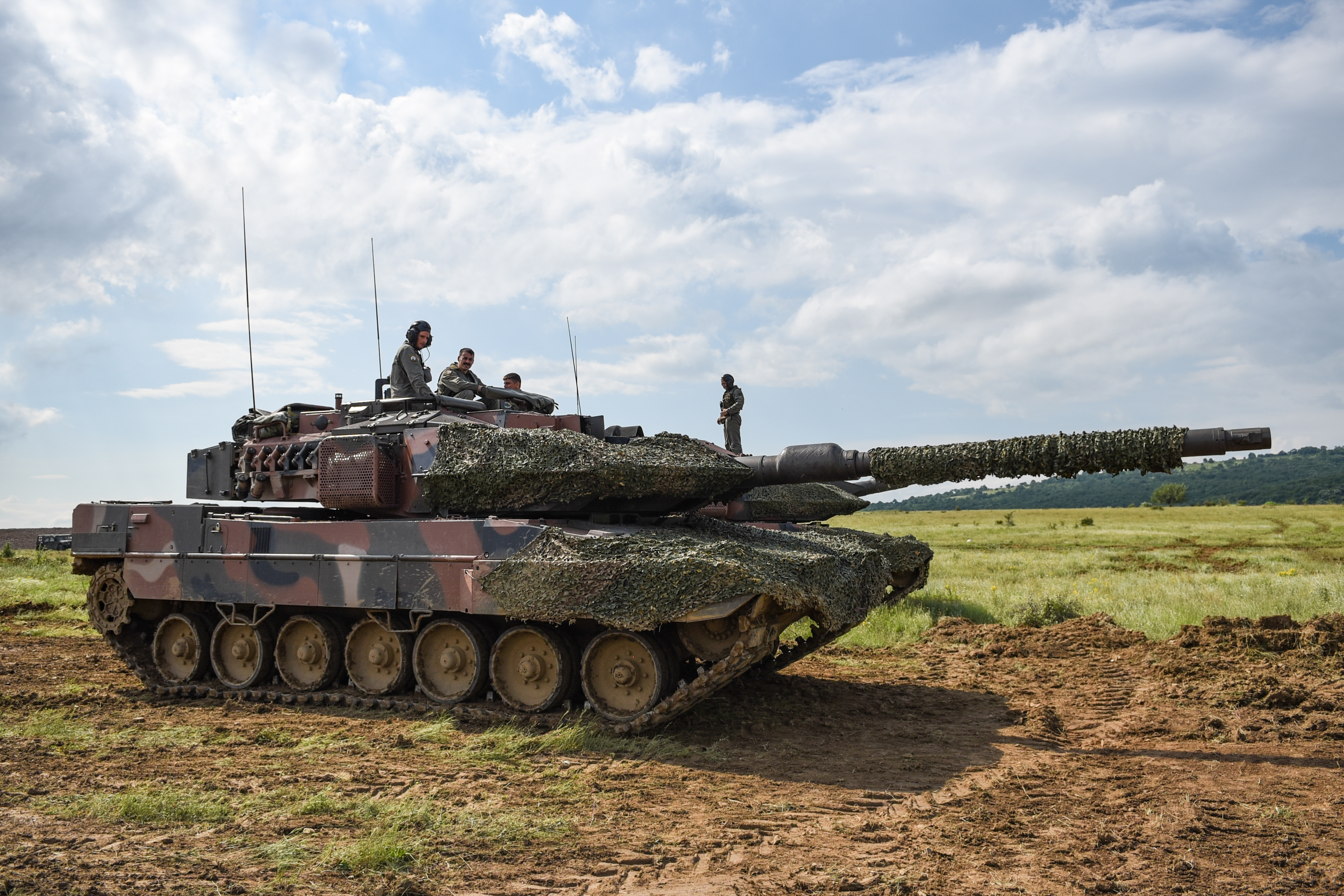
Leopard 2A6 HEL

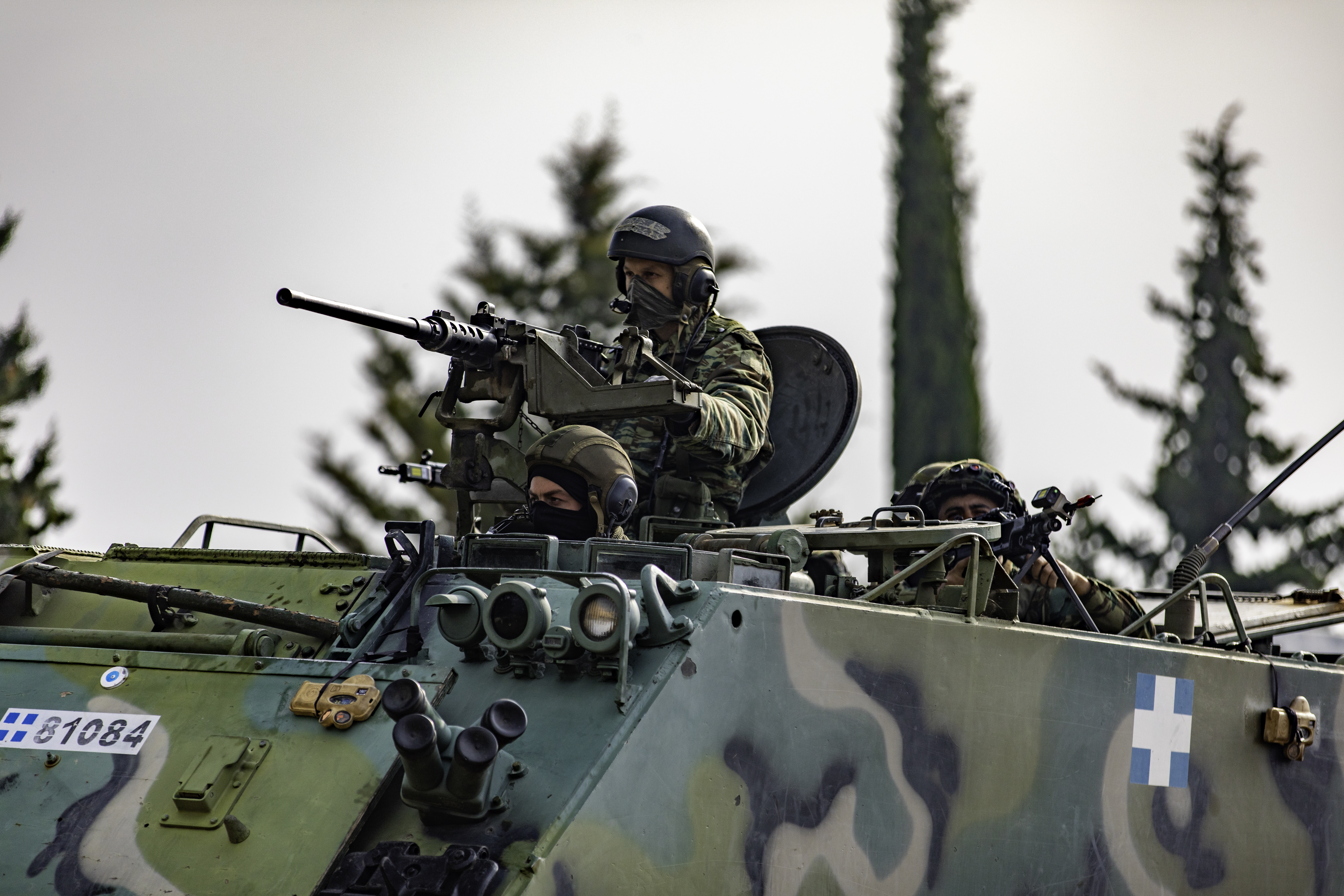
M2 Browning

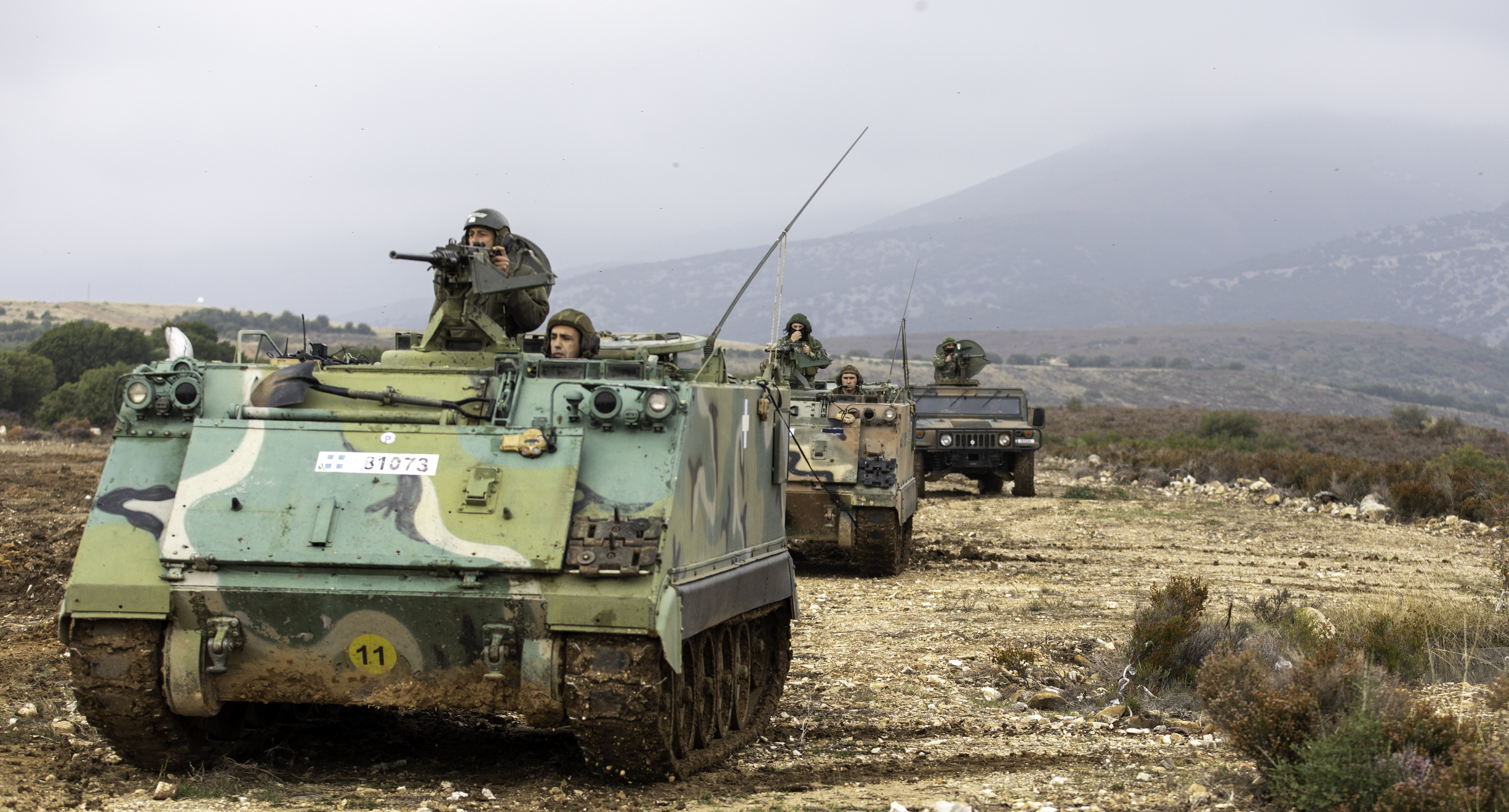
M113 APC

== Emblem ==
The unit emblem was adopted in 1979, and features the head of a horse and a tank within a green circle—the traditional colour of the Hellenic Army's Cavalry–Armour arm—on a black background. It also includes the unit motto, «ΘΝΗΣΚΕ ΥΠΕΡ ΠΑΤΡΙΔΟΣ» ("Die for the fatherland"), attributed to the Ancient Corinthian statesman Periander.
