= Ministry of the Navy =

Ministry of the Navy, Navy Ministry, Ministry for Naval Affairs or Naval Ministry can refer to one of the following cabinet departments charged with oversight of a country's naval forces:

- Ministry for Naval Affairs (Greece), 1822–1953
- Ministry for Naval Affairs (Sweden), 1840–1920
- Navy Ministry (Portugal), 1736–1982
- Ministry of the Navy (Brazil), 1822-1999
- Ministry of the Navy (Italy), 1861–1947
- Ministry of the Navy (Japan), 1872–1945
- Ministry of the Navy (Peru), 1920–1987
- Ministry of the Navy (Russia), 1815–1917
- Ministry of the Navy (Spain), 1808–1977
- Ministry of the Navy (Turkey), 1924–1927
- Ministry of the Navy and Colonies, France, 1547–1947
- Ministry of Navy (Norway), Norway, 1815–1885
- Prussian Naval Ministry, 1861–1871

== See also ==
- Admiralty (disambiguation)
- Navy Department (disambiguation)
