= Assiros =

Village in Central Macedonia, Greece

Assiros Άσσηρος
- Municipal unit
- Location within the regional unit

- Location within Greece
- Coordinates: 40°49.25′N 23°1.85′E
- Country: Greece
- Administrative region: Central Macedonia
- Regional unit: Thessaloniki
- Municipality: Lagkadas

Area
  - Municipal unit: 76.657 km^{2} (29.597 sq mi)
  - Community: 55.369 km^{2} (21.378 sq mi)
- Elevation: 186 m (610 ft)

Population (2021)
  - Municipal unit: 3,290
  - Municipal unit density: 42.9/km^{2} (111/sq mi)
  - Community: 2,037
  - Community density: 36.79/km^{2} (95.28/sq mi)
- Time zone: UTC+2 (EET)
  - Summer (DST): UTC+3 (EEST)
- Postal code: 57200
- Area code: +30-2394
- Vehicle registration: NA to NX

Assiros (Greek: Άσσηρος, before 1926: Γιουβέσνα - Giouvesna, Macedonian: Гвоздово, romanized: Gvozdovo) is a village and a former municipality in the Thessaloniki regional unit, Greece. Since the 2011 local government reform it is part of the municipality Lagkadas, of which it is a municipal unit. The 2011 census recorded 2,037 inhabitants in the community of Assiros and 3,290 inhabitants in the municipal unit. The community of Assiros covers an area of 55.369 km^{2}, while the respective municipal unit covers an area of 76.657 km^{2}.

== Administrative division ==
The community of Assiros consists of two separate settlements (2021 populations):

- Assiros (population 1,843)
- Examili (population 194)

== History ==
The archaeological site of Assiros Toumba, a 4000 year old settlement mound, is located within the territory of modern Assiros. Excavation between 1975 and 1989 at this site has made a major contribution to understanding the nature of settlement, society, economy and material culture in prehistoric Macedonia. A combination of radiocarbon and dendrochronological research on building timbers and radiocarbon dates for animal bones recovered from the site has provided one of the few accurate dates for the transition from Bronze to Iron Age in the Aegean area c.1070 BC.

According to the statistics of Vasil Kanchov ("Macedonia, Ethnography and Statistics"), 500 Greek Christians and 360 Turks lived in the village in 1900.

== See also ==
- Toumba
- List of settlements in the Thessaloniki regional unit
