= 23rd Armoured Brigade (Greece) =

23rd Armoured Brigade "3rd Cavalry Regiment Dorylaeum"
- 23η Τεθωρακισμένη Ταξιαρχία "3ο Σύνταγμα Ιππικού Δορυλαίον"
- Emblem of the 23rd Armoured Brigade
- Country: Greece
- Branch: Hellenic Army
- Type: Armoured
- Size: 5 Battalions
- Part of: 12th Mechanized Infantry Division (Greece)
- Garrison/HQ: Alexandroupoli, Western Thrace
- Motto(s): Wait for the right time

The 23rd Armoured Brigade "3rd Cavalry Regiment Dorylaeum" 23η Τεθωρακισμένη Ταξιαρχία "3ο Σύνταγμα Ιππικού Δορυλαίον" is a tank brigade of the Hellenic Army.

== Structure ==
23rd Armoured Brigade in Alexandroupoli

- HQ Company (ΙΣΤ)
- 21st Armoured Battalion (21 ΕΜΑ)
- 24th Armoured Battalion (24 ΕΜΑ)
- 644 Mechanized Infantry Battalion (644 M/K ΤΠ)
- 138 Self Propelled Artillery Battalion (138 Α/Κ ΜΜΠ)
- 23rd Engineer Company (23 ΛΜΧ)
- 23rd Signal Company (23 ΛΔΒ)
- 23rd Support Battalion (23 ΕΥΠ)
