= First Balkan War order of battle: Hellenic Army =

The following is the order of battle of the Hellenic Army during the First Balkan War of 1912–1913.

== Background ==
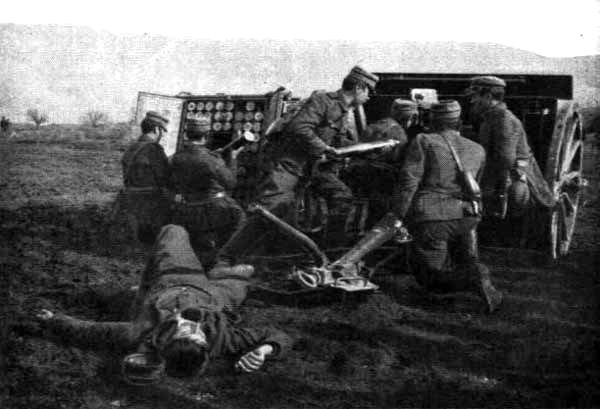
Greek artillerymen with 75 mm field gun.

Following the defeat in the Greco-Turkish War of 1897, starting in 1904 and especially after the Goudi coup of 1909, serious efforts were undertaken to reorganize and modernize the Army. From 1911, this task was undertaken by a French military mission. The peacetime establishment of the Hellenic Army in 1912 comprised four infantry divisions (1st at Larissa, 2nd at Athens, 3rd at Missolonghi and 4th at Nafplion) newly reformed as triangular divisions, a cavalry brigade, six Evzones battalions, four field artillery and two mountain artillery regiments, one fortress artillery battalion and various support units, including two engineer regiments and an aircraft company. From 25 March 1912, Crown Prince Constantine assumed the position of Inspector-General of the Army, becoming its de facto commander-in-chief.

Greece's territorial claims in Macedonia and Thrace clashed with those of Bulgaria, leading in the so-called 'Macedonian Struggle' between the two in 1904–1908, an armed guerrilla and propaganda conflict over influence over the local Christian populations. Nevertheless, from 1910 on, negotiations for the formation of a Greco-Bulgarian alliance, and later of a Balkan League encompassing all Christian Balkan states, began in earnest. Greece joined the League via a three-year, defensive military convention with Bulgaria on 29 May [O.S. 16 May] 1912, which obliged Greece to assist Bulgaria with 120,000 men on land and its fleet at sea; Bulgaria undertook to raise 300,000 men. Nevertheless, due to the defeat of 1897, the Greek army on land was generally disregarded as a serious factor, even among the Balkan allies.

== Mobilization ==
With the escalation of the crisis between the Balkan states and the Ottoman Empire, and the mobilization of Bulgarian forces on 29 September [O.S. 16 September] 1912, Greece followed suit with a general mobilization at midnight of 30 September [O.S. 17 September]. The decree of mobilization was also carried out on Crete, which although formally an autonomous state was annexed into Greece. The existing units were brought up to full strength, and the 5th, 6th, and 7th infantry divisions were set up. The number of men from the Greek diaspora, or foreign philhellenes, who rushed to Greece to join up was such that the 6th and 7th divisions were able to have three-battalion regiments, instead of the two-battalion regiments originally envisaged.

The Greek war plan had been updated as recently as 1912, and envisaged the division of the mobilized army into three parts:

- the Army of Thessaly (Στρατιά Θεσσαλίας), with three army corps and seven infantry divisions, with a total fore of about 100,000 men, 25,000 animals, and 3,500 vehicles
- the Army of Epirus (Στρατιά Ηπείρου), with an ad hoc assemblage of five infantry regiments and other units, with a total force of 13,000 men, 4,200 animals and 400 vehicles
- the rear area army, or Army of the Interior (Στρατός Εσωτερικού), with 17,000 men, 2,900 animals, and 1,800 vehicles

In contrast to pre-war planning, no army corps were established; instead, the divisions were directly subordinated to GHQ of the Army of Thessaly. The latter, which comprised the bulk of the Greek Army, was placed under the command of the Crown Prince and gathered around Larissa, while the Army of Epirus formed around Arta under Lieutenant General Konstantinos Sapountzakis. After the Ottoman government rejected an ultimatum of the Balkan states, Serbia and Bulgaria declared war on 17 October [O.S. 4 October], with Greece following the next day.

== Army of Thessaly, 18 October 1912 ==
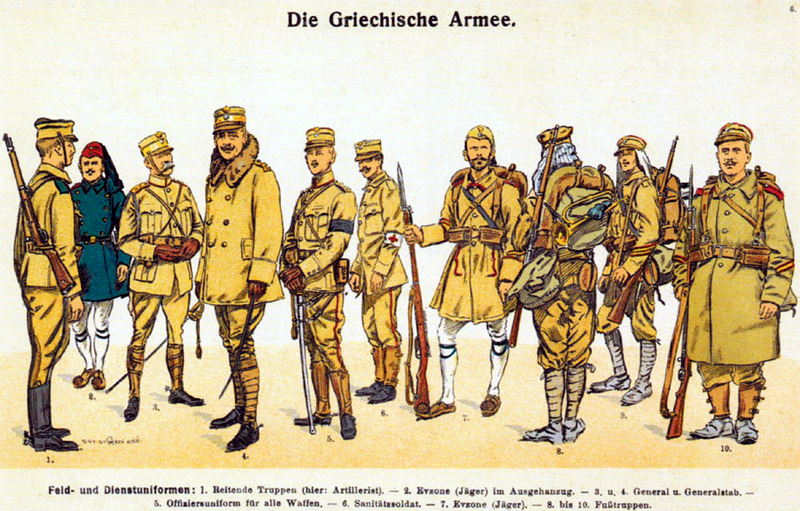
Field uniforms of the Greek Army during the Balkan Wars

The Army of Thessaly comprised in total 59 infantry and 4 Evzone battalions, eight cavalry companies (of the Cavalry Brigade) and six half-companies (organic to the infantry divisions), seven engineer companies (organic to the infantry divisions), 32 artillery batteries with 96 field guns, 24 mountain guns and 54 fortress guns and 70 machine-guns, and various support troops including an aviation company with four aircraft. The force totalled some 100,000 men, with c. 80,000 front-line effectives. On 18 October [O.S. 5 October] these were organized in the following formations:

- 1st Infantry Division (Ι Μεραρχία), under Maj Gen Emmanouil Manousogiannakis, at Ampelonas
  - 2nd Infantry Regiment
  - 4th Infantry Regiment
  - 5th Infantry Regiment
  - 1st and 2nd squadrons of the 1st Field Artillery Regiment
- 2nd Infantry Division (II Μεραρχία), under Maj Gen Konstantinos Kallaris, at Tyrnavos
  - 1st Infantry Regiment
  - 3rd Infantry Regiment
  - 7th Infantry Regiment
  - 1st and 2nd squadrons of the 2nd Field Artillery Regiment
- 3rd Infantry Division (III Μεραρχία), under Maj Gen Konstantinos Damianos, west of Larissa
  - 6th Infantry Regiment
  - 10th Infantry Regiment
  - 12th Infantry Regiment
  - 1st and 2nd squadrons of the 3rd Field Artillery Regiment
  - 3rd Mountain Artillery Squadron
- 4th Infantry Division (IV Μεραρχία), under Maj Gen Konstantinos Moschopoulos, at Petrino
  - 8th Infantry Regiment
  - 9th Infantry Regiment
  - 11th Infantry Regiment
  - 1st and 2nd squadrons of the 4th Field Artillery Regiment
  - 1st Mountain Artillery Squadron
- 5th Infantry Division (V Μεραρχία), under Col Dimitrios Matthaiopoulos, at Krannonas
  - 16th Infantry Regiment
  - 22nd Infantry Regiment
  - 23rd Infantry Regiment
  - 3rd Squadron of the 1st Field Artillery Regiment
  - 2nd Mountain Artillery Squadron
- 6th Infantry Division (VI Μεραρχία), under Col Konstantinos Miliotis-Komninos, at Platykambos
  - 1st Evzone Regiment
  - 17th Infantry Regiment
  - 18th Infantry Regiment
  - 3rd Squadron of the 2nd Field Artillery Regiment
- 7th Infantry Division (VII Μεραρχία), still forming at Larissa under Col Kleomenis Kleomenous
  - 19th Infantry Regiment
  - 20th Infantry Regiment
  - 21st Infantry Regiment
  - 3rd Squadron of the 3rd Field Artillery Regiment
  - Machine-gun Squadron
- Cavalry Brigade (Ταξιαρχία Ιππικού), under Maj Gen Alexandros Soutsos, at Farkadona and Zarkos
  - 1st Cavalry Regiment
  - 3rd Cavalry Regiment
- Gennadis Detachment (Απόσπασμα Γεννάδη), under Col Stefanos Gennadis, covering the army's left flank at Koniskos
  - 1st Evzone Battalion
  - 4th Evzone Battalion
- Konstantinopoulos Detachment (Απόσπασμα Κωνσταντινοπούλου), under Col Konstantinos Konstantinopoulos, covering the army's right flank, northeast of Tyrnavos
  - 2nd Evzone Battalion
  - 6th Evzone Battalion

== Army of Epirus ==
The theatre of operations of Epirus was of secondary strategic importance, with the Army of Epirus having initially a purely defensive mission. Initially, the Army of Epirus was outnumbered by the Ottoman forces in the area (Yanya Corps under Esad Pasha), which numbered about 20,000 men. It nevertheless pushed back the initial Ottoman assaults, took Preveza and advanced to the approaches of the Ioannina fortified zone. Two attacks on the city in December and January were repulsed by the Ottoman forces, but after extensive preparations and transfer of forces from Macedonia, the city fell following the Battle of Bizani. The Army of Epirus was commanded until 23 January [O.S. 10 January] 1913 by Lt Gen Konstantinos Sapountzakis, and thereafter by Crown Prince Constantine.

=== Order of battle, 18 October 1912 ===
The Army of Epirus was composed of several independent units of roughly divisional strength. Its forces numbered eight infantry and Evzone battalions, one cavalry company and 24 guns, totalling some 10,500 men in the early days of the war. At the outbreak of the war, it comprised the following units, concentrated in and around Arta:

- 15th Infantry Regiment
- 3rd Evzone Battalion
- 3rd Independent Evzone Battalion,
- 7th Evzone Battalion
- 10th Reserve Evzone Battalion
- 2nd National Guard Battalion
- 2nd Fortress Artillery Squadron
- 3rd Field Artillery Squadron/4th Field Artillery Regiment
- 2nd Mountain Artillery Squadron

To these were later added two battalions of Cretans, as well as the volunteer Garibaldini legion. On 25 December [O.S. 12 December], these forces formed the Epirus Division (Μεραρχία Ηπείρου), renamed in February 1913 as the 8th Infantry Division (VIII Μεραρχία). In early December, the Army of Epirus was reinforced with the 2nd Infantry Division, followed on 27 December by the 4th Division, by mid-January by the 6th Division and the 7th Infantry Regiment. In preparation for the Battle of Bizani, the Crown Prince brought in additional troops and artillery, while a Mixed Brigade was formed to attack the fortifications of Ioannina from the northeastern flank.

=== Order of battle before the Battle of Bizani ===
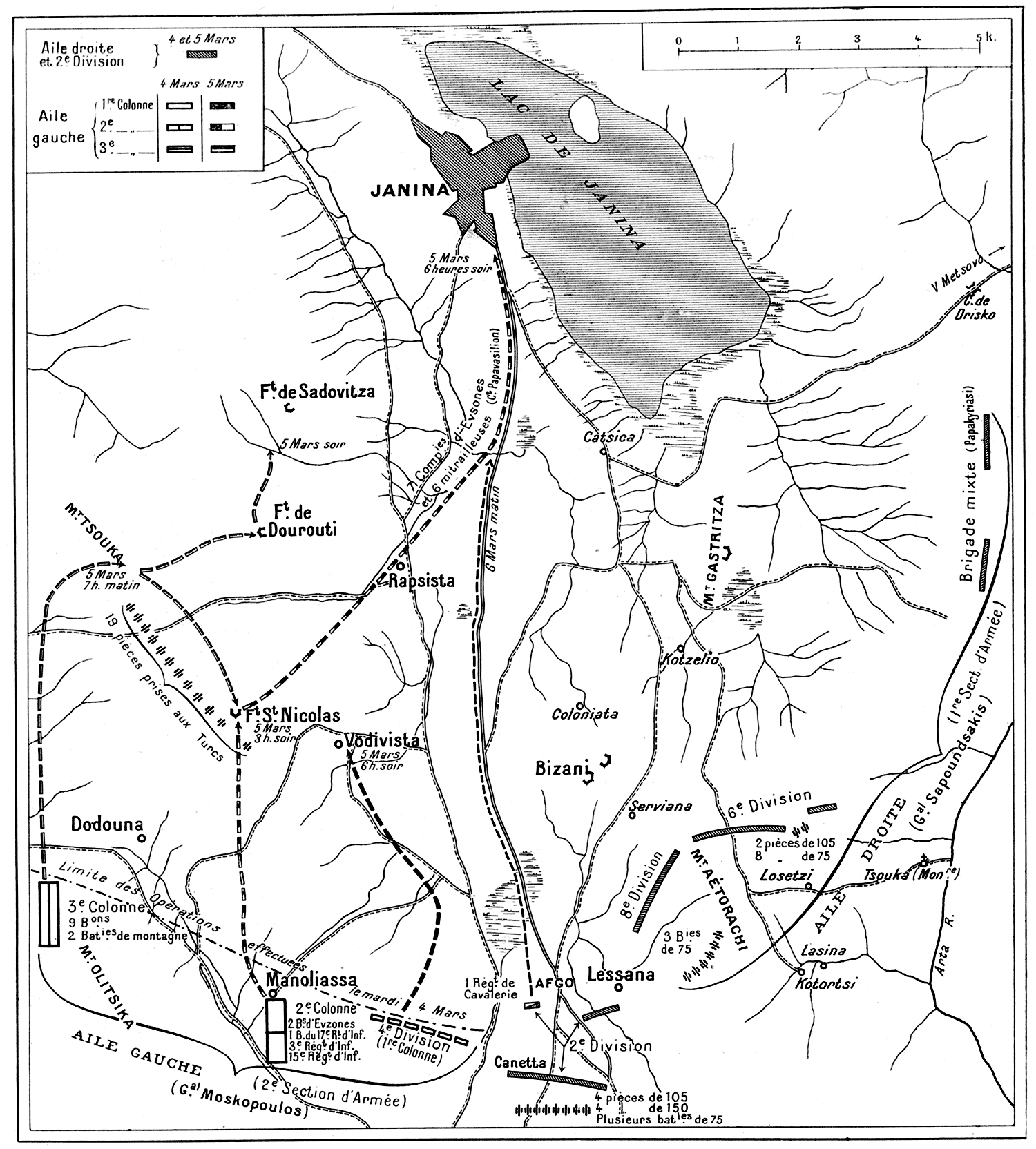
Plan of the Greek flanking move that led to the fall of Ioannina.

Before the Battle of Bizani, the Army of Epirus comprised the 2nd, 4th, 6th and 8th Infantry Divisions, the Mixed Brigade, a cavalry regiment and the three independent detachments of Acheron, Preveza and Himara, in total 51 infantry battalions and other units, comprising 41,400 men with 48 machine guns and 93 field and mountain guns.

These were grouped as follows, from the right to the left of the Greek front:

- First Army Detachment (Α′ Τμήμα Στρατιάς), under Lt Gen Konstantinos Sapountzakis, on the right of the Greek front:
  - Mixed Metsovon Brigade (Μικτή Ταξιαρχία Μετσόβου), under Col Ioannis Papakyriazis, formed from the 4th Infantry Regiment (from 1st Division) and the Metsovon Detachment of Lt Col. Mitsas plus other units, in total six battalions, six machine guns and eight mountain guns
  - 6th Infantry Division (VI Μεραρχία), under Col Konstantinos Miliotis-Komninos
    - three battalions
    - 12 field guns
  - 8th Infantry Division (VIII Μεραρχία), under Col Dimitrios Matthaiopoulos
    - Cretan Regiment, of 3 battalions and four machine guns
    - 2nd Evzone Regiment, of 2 battalions and eight machine guns
    - 8 field guns and four machine guns
- 2nd Infantry Division (II Μεραρχία), under Maj Gen Konstantinos Kallaris, comprising four and a half battalions, eight machine guns, twelve field guns and a cavalry half-company.
- Second Army Detachment (Β′ Τμήμα Στρατιάς), under Maj Gen Konstantinos Moschopoulos, CO of the 4th Infantry Division on the left of the Greek front. It comprised mainly the 4th Division (IV Μεραρχία) plus units from the other divisions, organized in three columns:
  - First Column (Α′ Φάλαγγα) under Col Dimitrios Antoniadis, with six battalions, eight machine guns and eight mountain guns
  - Second Column (Β′ Φάλαγγα) under Col Ioannis Giannakitsas, with eight battalions, fourteen machine guns and eight mountain guns
  - Third Column (Γ′ Φάλαγγα) under Col Nikolaos Delagrammatikas, with six battalions, eight machine guns, 10 mountain guns, a cavalry half-company
    - Olitsikas Detachment (Απόσπασμα Ολίτσικα) of three battalions
- Army Reserve or independent units within the Army's operational zone:
  - Epirus Cavalry Regiment (Σύνταγμα Ιππικού Ηπείρου), of three companies and two machine guns
  - Army Artillery, of six field and two heavy batteries, with 34 guns
  - Acheron Detachment (Απόσπασμα Αχέροντος) of 4 battalions, 4 machine guns and five field guns, at Paramythia
  - Preveza Detachment (Απόσπασμα Πρεβέζης) of two battalions, around Preveza and Filippiada
  - Himara Detachment (Απόσπασμα Χειμάρρας) of one battalion, two machine guns and two field guns, at Himara

== Sources ==
- Erickson, Edward J. (2003). Defeat in Detail: The Ottoman Army in the Balkans, 1912–1913. Westport, CT: Greenwood. ISBN 0-275-97888-5.
- Hall, Richard C. (2000). The Balkan Wars, 1912–1913: Prelude to the First World War. London: Routledge. ISBN 0-415-22946-4.
- Oikonomou, Nikolaos (1977). "Ο Α′ Βαλκανικός Πόλεμος: Οι επιχειρήσεις του ελληνικού στρατού και στόλου" [The First Balkan War: Operations of the Greek army and fleet]. In Christopoulos, Georgios A. & Bastias, Ioannis K. (eds.). Ιστορία του Ελληνικού Έθνους, Τόμος ΙΔ΄: Νεώτερος Ελληνισμός από το 1881 έως το 1913 [History of the Greek Nation, Volume XIV: Modern Hellenism from 1881 to 1913] (in Greek). Athens: Ekdotiki Athinon. pp. 289–326. ISBN 978-960-213-110-7.
- Επίτομη Ιστορία των Βαλκανικών Πολέμων 1912-1913 [Concise History of the Balkan Wars 1912–1913] (in Greek). Athens: Hellenic Army General Staff, Army History Directorate. 1987. OCLC 51846788.
- Η ιστορία της οργάνωσης του Ελληνικού Στρατού, 1821–1954 [History of the Organization of the Hellenic Army, 1821–1954] (in Greek). Hellenic Army General Staff, Army History Directorate. 2005. ISBN 960-7897-45-5.
