= 5/42 Evzone Regiment =

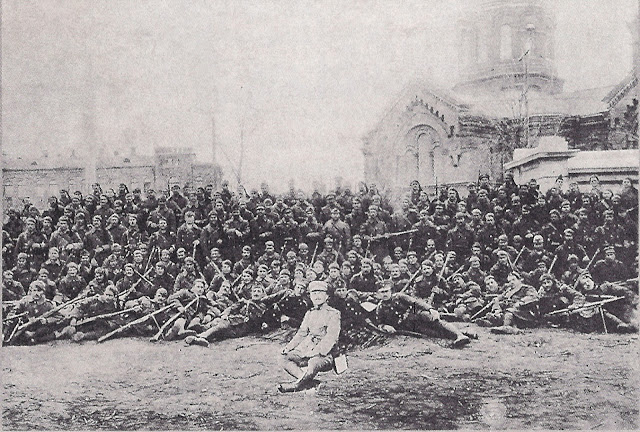
- Men of the 5/42 Evzone Regiment in Odessa c. 1919
- Active: 1913–1941; 1948–1954; 1979–present
- Country: Greece
- Branch: Hellenic Army
- Type: Infantry
- Size: Regiment (currently battalion-size)
- Part of: 80th National Guard Higher Command
- Garrison/HQ: Lamia (1913–1941); Larissa (1948–1954); Skydra (1980–?); Kalymnos (since 2003)
- Engagements: World War I: Macedonian front; Vardar Offensive; Russian Civil War: Allied intervention in the Russian Civil War; Southern Front; Southern Russia Intervention; Greco-Turkish War (1919-1922): Greek Summer Offensive; Battle of the Gediz; Battle of Aslıhanlar–Dumlupınar; Battle of Kütahya–Eskişehir; Battle of the Sakarya; Battle of Dumlupınar; World War II: Greco-Italian War; Battle of Elaia–Kalamas; Italian spring offensive; Battle of Greece; Greek Civil War: Operation Koronis; Operation Pyrsos
- Decorations: Commander's Cross of the Cross of Valour x2

Commanders
- Notable commanders: Nikolaos Plastiras

The 5/42 Evzone Regiment "Delvinaki" (Greek: 5/42 Σύνταγμα Ευζώνων «Δελβινάκι», 5/42 ΣΕ) is an active infantry unit of the Hellenic Army. It was established in 1913 as an elite regiment of Evzones, recruited in Central Greece and headquartered in Lamia. As such the unit served in the Macedonian front of World War I, the Allied intervention in Ukraine, the Greco-Turkish War of 1919–1922, and the Greco-Italian War during World War II. Reformed as the 53rd Brigade (53η Ταξιαρχία) in 1948, it participated in the Greek Civil War, before receiving the designation 5/42 Infantry Regiment (5/42 Σύνταγμα Πεζικού, 5/42 ΣΠ) in 1951. The regiment was disbanded in 1954, but revived as a reserve formation in 1979, under its original name. In November 2000 it received the honorific title "Delvinaki". Since January 2003 it is a battalion-sized formation that forms the garrison of the Dodecanese island of Kalymnos.

== History ==
=== Establishment and World War I ===
The regiment was established, along with the other four Evzone regiments of the Hellenic Army, by Royal Decree on 23 December 1913. Its base was at Lamia, and it came under the command of 13th Infantry Division in Chalkis.

The first years of its history are relatively obscure, largely because the relevant archives were destroyed both in the aftermath of the National Schism of 1916 and during the Axis occupation of Greece in World War II. The regiment certainly participated in the mobilization of 10 September 1915, and remained in wartime strength until the demobilization, forced on Greece (then still neutral) by the Allied Powers, on 26 May 1916. As part of the Allied demands, most of the Greek army was evacuated to the Peloponnese; doubtlessly the 5/42 Regiment was part of this.

Following Greece's entry into World War I on the side of the Allies in June 1917, the Greek army began to be re-formed. The 5/42 Regiment began its mobilization on 16 January 1918, and after reaching its full strength moved by ship to Thessaloniki, where it completed its training by the end of May 1918. As part of 13th Division, in June the regiment was moved to the Macedonian front along the Strymon River, occupying positions between the Achinos Lake and the village of Agia Eleni. During September, the regiment conducted a reconnaissance in force mission to ascertain enemy strength in its sector, in preparation for the great Allied offensive of that month. In October, as the rest of 13th Division was withdrawn to participate in the northward advance of I Army Corps, the regiment took over the entire front sector of the division. On 16 September, Bulgaria signed the Armistice of Salonica, obliging it to evacuate all Greek and Serbian territory it occupied. As a result, on 3 October the 5/42 Regiment was ordered to reoccupy the port city of Kavala. The Bulgarian garrison initially refused to comply with the armistice terms, but after the regiment took battle positions outside the city, the Bulgarians agreed to withdraw.

=== Plastiras takes command and the Ukraine expedition ===
Despite its participation in the front, the regiment was regarded as highly problematic: most of its recruits and officers, including its commander, Colonel Kontos, were loyal to King Constantine I, who had been ousted by the Allies in June 1917, allowing Prime Minister Eleftherios Venizelos to bring Greece into the war. Dissatisfaction was so rife that in August 1918 the regiment was the centre of a conspiracy, which included the other units of the 13th Division as well, to defect to the Bulgarians. The conspiracy was thwarted at the last moment due to happen-stance. The unit was furthermore plagued by indiscipline, with soldiers and even officers looting the local peasants, particularly Turks.

It was at that point that command was assumed by Lt. Colonel Nikolaos Plastiras, who had until then commanded the 6th Regiment of the Archipelago Division, part of the staunchly Venizelist Army of National Defence. As such, his first contact with his men was marked by barely disguised hostility, with soldiers muttering that they would shoot him as soon as they got into combat. The regiment was slated to be part of the Greek expeditionary force in the Allied intervention in the Russian Civil War, and Plastiras tried to raise morale by pointing out that the expedition was in support of Greek territorial claims on Smyrna and Asia Minor. Plastiras soon managed to instill discipline, reform and re-equip the unit, which under his command distinguished itself over the following three years of campaigning.

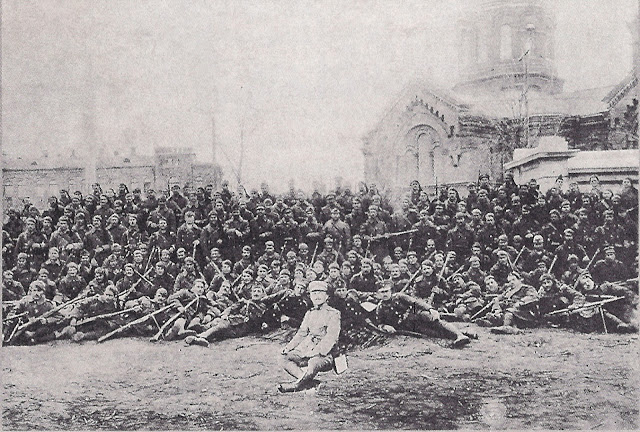
Men of the regiment with Captain Christodoulou, Odessa, 1919

The regiment remained at Kavala until February 1919. On 28 February, it embarked at Eleftheres for Ukraine, on board the passenger liners Imperator Nikolai and Patris. The regiment disembarked at Odessa on 4 March. Ten days later it was sent to reinforce the northeastern sector of the Allied front at Serbka. In the evening of 16 March it relieved the 3rd Infantry Regiment, which had been fighting against superior Bolshevik forces for ten days without interruption. Plastiras took over command of two other Greek battalions from the 3rd and 34th regiments, as well as local French cavalry, engineers, and artillery units, and formed a tactical detachment, which gave the regiment the name under which it became famous: "Plastiras Detachment" (Απόσπασμα Πλαστήρα). On 17 March the detachment repelled Bolshevik attacks and, launching a counterattack, pursued them beyond their original starting lines. Renewed offensives on the 18th were also repulsed, but the withdrawal of French units elsewhere along the front forced the 5/42 Regiment to likewise withdraw. The following five days (19–23 March) were spent in a continuous fighting retreat, until the Allied high command negotiated their safe withdrawal to Bessarabia. On 29 March, the 5/42 Regiment crossed the Dniester River to Romanian territory. Along with the other Allied forces, the 5/42 Regiment occupied defensive positions along the Dniester to prevent the Bolsheviks from crossing it until 17 May, when it was relieved by Romanian troops. As with the rest of 13th Division, it gradually withdrew through Romania over the next month, until embarking for Smyrna from Galați on 15 June.

The regiment's experience in Ukraine, albeit brief, resulted in an innovation that characterized it under Plastiras' command: due to their contact with the Russians, especially the Cossacks, the Evzones had acquired horses, and Plastiras formed a small mounted detachment of Evzones. Gradually, this mounted detachment was expanded over the next few years with captured horses. In Asia Minor, it provided valuable reconnaissance services, making contact and dismounting to fight while the rest of the regiment caught up; although not trained as cavalrymen, its infantrymen even held their own in clashes against the formidable Turkish cavalry.

=== Asia Minor Campaign ===
==== Arrival and first operations, 1919 ====
The 5/42 Evzone Regiment arrived at Smyrna on 19 June. From there the regiment marched to the front, relieving the 5th Archipelago Regiment near Manisa on 28 June. The regiment had its first clash with the Turkish nationalists on 8 July, when it repelled attack by Turkish irregulars against the village of Papazli, killing 5 and taking 25 enemy prisoners. Another attack by an 800-strong force on 29 July was also repulsed, with 90 casualties among the attackers. The regiment retained and strengthened its positions around Manisa for the next three months. In November, however, the Supreme Allied Council allowed the Greek army to advance beyond the original limits of the Greek zone of occupation, and the 5/42 Regiment occupied new forward positions on 19–22 November. The regiment participated with one company in a local attack by the 1st Battalion, 30th Infantry Regiment on 8 January 1920, but otherwise the period until the beginning of the Greek summer offensive in June 1920 was relatively tranquil.

==== 1920 summer offensive ====
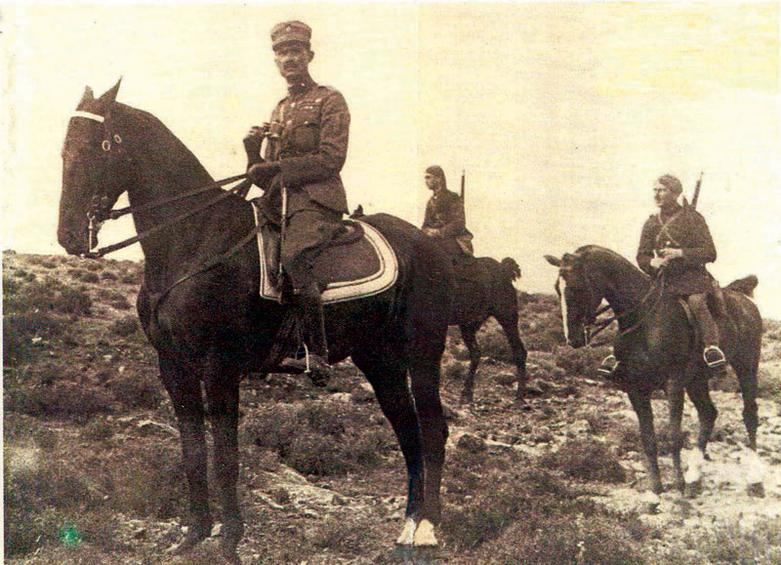
Plastiras with mounted Evzones during the Asia Minor Campaign

During the 1920 summer offensive, the regiment captured Akhisar (Axari), followed by Gelembe (12 June), Balıkesir (16 June), and Ömerköy (19 June), where it linked up with the Mixed Brigade of the Xanthi Division, that had landed at Bandırma on the same day. From 23 June to 23 August it occupied defensive positions in the Susurluk–Kepsut area. On 24 August it began moving south to Elvadar in the area of Alaşehir, and from there, on 10 October, to Uşak. On 15 October the regiment took over the salient at Gediz, and three days later advanced further to take over the front subsector of Dosecık. A Turkish attack on the Gediz sector was repelled, and the Greek forces were able to occupy strong defensive positions. As contact with the retreating Turkish forces was lost, on 3 November two companies of the 5/42 Regiment carried out a reconnaissance in force in a depth of 7–10 kilometres, engaging and destroying two enemy groups of 100 men each.

From 6 November 1920 until March 1921, the regiment occupied defensive positions in the Selvioğlu—Kada area west of Uşak. During that time, in Greece, a decisive political change occurred, when Venizelos was defeated and the royalist opposition took power in the November 1920 elections. In its aftermath, most of the commanders in the Asia Minor front, who were mostly Venizelist, were replaced by royalist appointees. Although most of the men of the 5/42 Regiment were themselves royalist and anti-Venizelist, by this time their esprit de corps and identification with Plastiras was so strong, that the latter was retained in command of the regiment by the new government.

==== 1921 spring offensive ====
The regiment participated in the spring offensive of 1921, that ended with the Second Battle of İnönü. It began its advance on 10 March, at the head of the 13th Division's column, occupied the passes between Tokutepe and Tezler Karlık on the 11th, descended the northern slopes of Akar Dağ despite the heavy snow which in many places reached the height of a man (1.7 m), and occupied the line Güney Tezler on the 12th. On the 13th, the regiment reached the Cakirsaz–Yağcılar heights, where it came into contact with the main Turkish forces. On 6:00 on the next day, the regiment launched a frontal attack with its 1st and 2nd Battalions, while the 3rd Battalion launched a flanking manoeuvre to the enemy left. The threat of encirclement forced the Turks to withdraw, allowing the regiment to capture the Cakirsaz heights and enter the city of Afyonkarahisar on the same day. Over the next five days, the regiment advanced east some 15 kilometres, and captured the town of Çay on the 20th. However, despite the successes achieved in the southern sector of the front, assigned to I Army Corps, in the north the III Army Corps failed to achieve its objectives. As a result, the Army of Asia Minor broke off the offensive and ordered the I Army Corps to withdraw from its gains to the area of Dumlupınar. The 5/42 Regiment withdrew to Balmahmut, and thence to positions south of Dumlupınar on 26 March. On 28–29 March the regiment participated in the repulsion of the Turkish attack on the new Greek positions, by a manoeuvre towards Ali Veran, where it succeeded in dispersing significant Turkish infantry and cavalry forces.

==== Advance to Ankara and retreat, summer 1921 ====
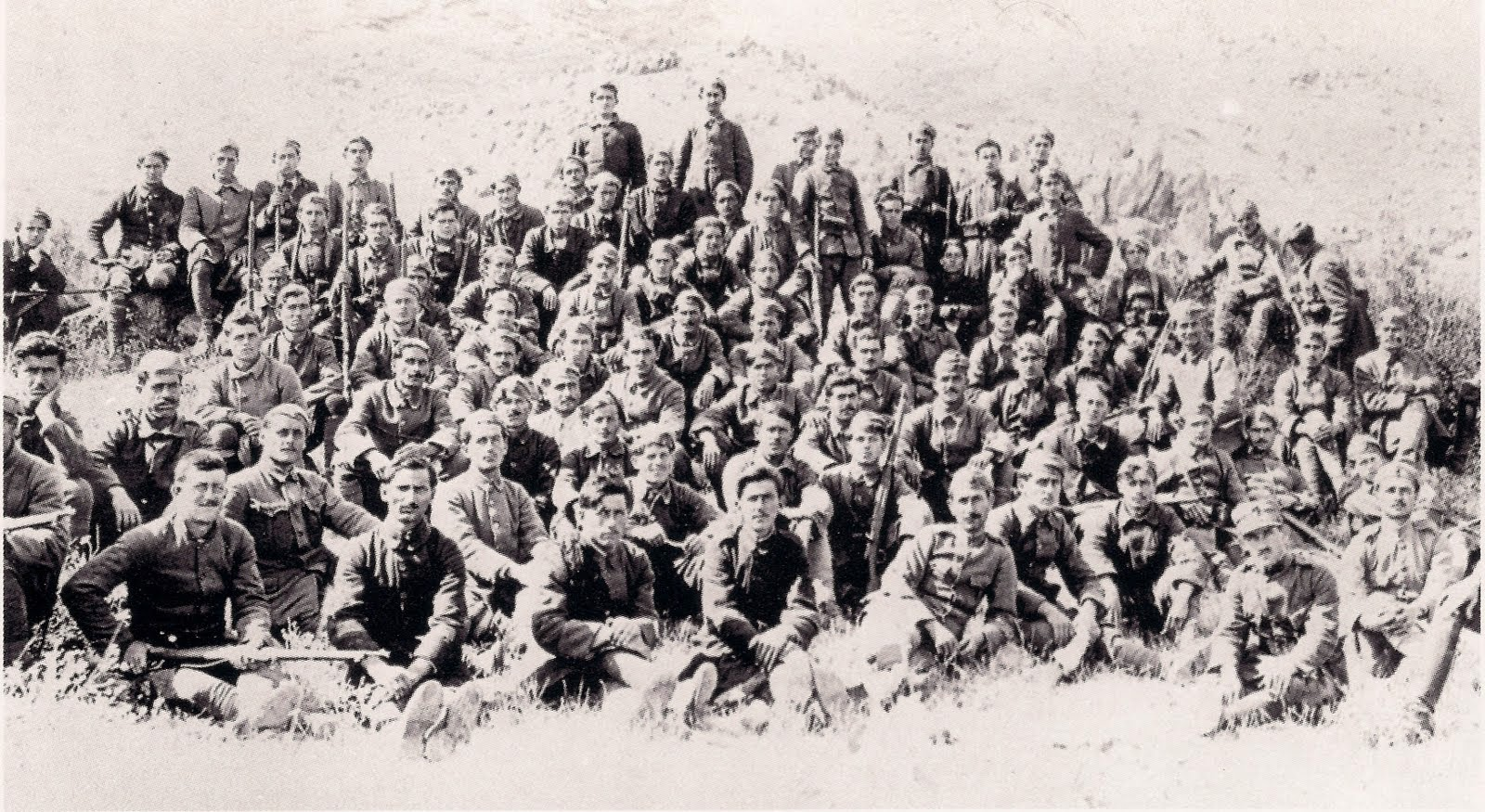
Soldiers of the 5/42 Regiment in Asia Minor, 1921

From 1 April it was stationed at Elma Dağ, and then at Derbent, where it assembled as part of the preparations for a summer offensive. The second Greek summer offensive began on 24 June 1920. On 24–25 June, the 5/42 Regiment advanced to its starting positions at Alaba. It began its attack on 29, and within the day advanced to new positions north and northeast of the town of Altıntaş. On 2–3 July the regiment's advance was halted due to strong Turkish resistance, but the advance of II Army Corps forced the Turks to withdraw, and the regiment continued its advance towards Seyitgazi, reaching the heights southeast of the town on 7 July. On 8 July it captured the Düztepe heights by storm, and repulsed strong Turkish counterattacks during the night. The regiment remained at Düztepe as a covering force until 31 July, occupying the right flank o 13th Division.

When the Greek high command decided to continue operations towards Ankara, the 5/42 Regiment advanced east through the northern reaches of the salt desert around Lake Tuz; the march lasted from 1–10 August. With the start of the Battle of Sakarya, on the 12th the regiment attacked the flank of the Turkish 1st Group of Divisions, in the direction of Bakal Dağ. On the next day, it attacked the heights of Karatepe and captured the western portion of the Kaltakli plateau. On 14–15 August, the regiment captured the area south of the Karasuleymanlı village. On the night of 24 August, it repulsed a night attack by the Turkish forces, and another strong attack on the next day. On 28–29 the regiment was moved to the left flank of the Army of Asia Minor, and crossed the Sakarya River on the 30th, occupying new defensive positions north of Çandakoğlu Dere, covering the right flank of 13th Division.

Following the Greek retreat from Sakarya, the regiment continued covering the right of 13th Division, but sent its 2nd Battalion to reinforce the 12th Infantry Division on 2 September. On 27 September, the regiment occupied defensive positions between the heights north of Hayren Baba to the ravine of Ayaz In. There it remained until March 1922, when it handed over the Ayaz In subsector to the 5th Infantry Division. One battalion established a fortified centre at Ruklu Dağ, while the remainder of the regiment was kept in the reserve. On 29 March, the Ruklu Dağ section was handed over to 3rd Infantry Regiment, and the regiment was wholly placed in reserve of the I Army Corps. On 13 June it was moved to Çakırsaz, with one battalion at Afyonkarahisar.

==== Collapse and retreat to the coast, August 1922 ====
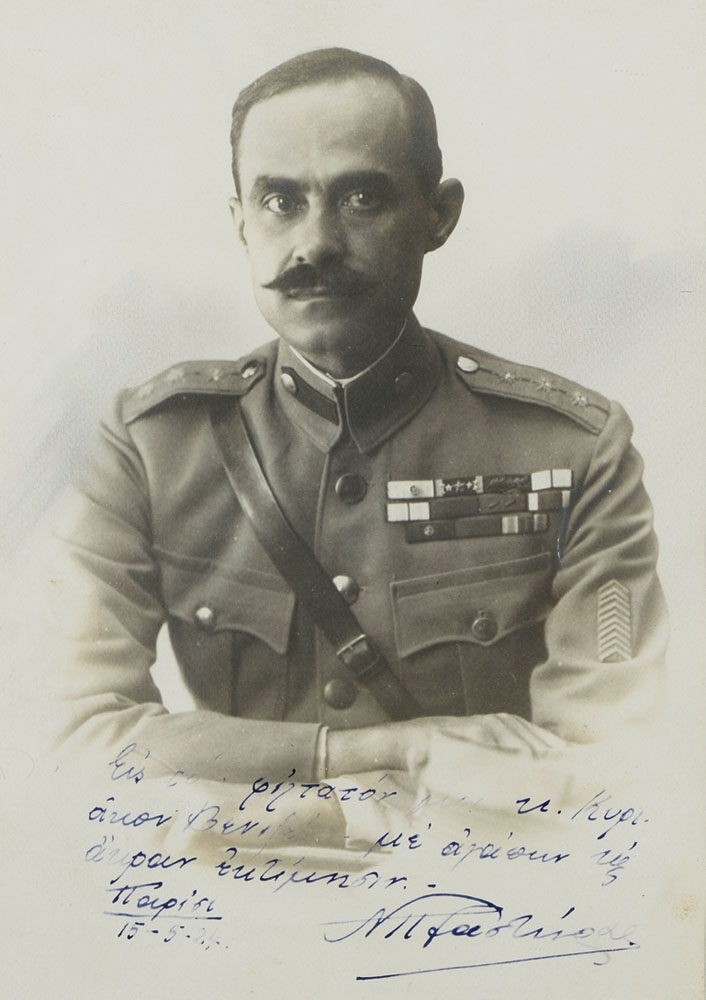
Photo of Col. Nikolaos Plastiras, c. 1924

On 26 August 1922, the Turkish army launched a major and decisive offensive. The regiment was ordered forward to cover 4th Infantry Division's right flank, and plug the gap between it and the neighbouring 1st Infantry Division, at the Kalecik subsector. On the same evening, the regiment's 3rd company recaptured the strongpoint of Katsimpali, and the 1st and 2nd Battalions established advance guards at the Kalecik subsector; the 3rd Battalion arrived at the area at dawn of the 14th, after marching through the night. The regiment spent the entire day repulsing Turkish attacks supported by heavy artillery fire. The regiment launched counterattacks, but the 1st and 3rd Battalions suffered heavy losses, forcing them to withdraw, covered by 2nd Battalion. With great difficulty, and after suffering over 600 killed and injured, the regiment managed to occupy new positions on the Beltepe heights; at 18:30, it received the order to withdraw. The withdrawal was carried out during the night: passing south of the Köprülü heights, held by the 23rd Infantry Regiment, the Evzones arrived at the train line some 3 km west of the Balmahmut rail station, where they stopped. On the next day, the regiment continued its retreat towards the Dumlupınar heights, and established new defensive positions at Hasan Dede Tepe in the evening. On the 16th, it repulsed an attack by a Turkish regimental-sized force. During the next day, the V and XIII cavalry demi-companies and the regiment's own mounted detachment arrived, having passed through the Turkish lines. Due to the advance of the Turks on both of its flanks, and in order to avoid being cut off, Plastiras again decided to withdraw, with the 3rd Battalion covering the rear. On the 18th, marching through mountainous and wooded terrain, the retreating Evzones were attacked by another regimental-sized Turkish force, but repelled it, and reached the foothills of Elma Dağ around midnight.

The 5/42 Regiment managed to re-establish contact with the other Greek forces, specifically the remnants of the 1st Division, at 11:00 on 19 August. Along with what remained of 1st Division's 2nd and 3rd Infantry Regiments, the 5/42 Regiment continued its retreat until reaching Takmak on the evening of 20 August. By the next day, the 5/42 Evzone Regiment remained as one of the few cohesive and battle-worthy formations in the entire II Army Corps area. On the initiative of Plastiras, the regiment did not follow the remaining forces of the Corps, but remained as a rear guard, originally placed in reserve to 7th Infantry Division northeast of Kiranköy. Later that same day, it was ordered to occupy the Beskaya Dağ heights to cover 7th Division's left flank. A Turkish column moving to occupy Ak Taş made contact with the regiment's new positions, and was torn apart by concentrated infantry and artillery fire. During the night, the withdrawal resumed, with the Evzones as 7th Division's rear guard. On the evening of the next day, it arrived at the village of Paklacık, and thence to the rail station of Alaşehir, where it embarked on trains, arriving at Salihli around midnight. At daybreak on the 23rd, it became clear that Salihli was surrounded by strong Turkish infantry and cavalry forces, but after a three-hour battle, together with elements of the Cavalry Division, the Evzones managed to force the Turkish forces to disperse and withdraw.

The regiment remained at Salihli until 05:00 of 24 August, when it rejoined 13th Division, marching towards Kasaba (modern Turgutlu), where it arrived on 02:00 of 25 August. Later on the same day the regiment was ordered to occupy positions on the southeastern slopes of Mount Nif, but on its way there it was recalled and ordered instead to make for Burnabaşi, where it arrived on 21:00. There it remained during the next day, setting off at 01:00 of 27 August for Kozağaç, where it arrived on 07:00. The regiment guarded the flanks of the Southern Group, allowing its main column to escape to safety; a small Turkish irregular force attacked but was repulsed. The regiment set off again on 14:00 for Akçekaya, where it arrived six hours later. From the morning of 28 August, the 5/42 Regiment covered the retreat of the remaining Greek forces through the Çeşme peninsula to the coast, marching through Gülbahçe, Güneli, and Lestren Tepe (today also known as Ulaştıran Dağı), where it arrived at noon on the 29th. It remained there until midnight on 31 August, when it moved towards Alaçatı, occupying positions west of Zeytineli in order to cover the embarkation of the other units. Finally, on 2 September, the regiment moved to Çeşme, where it embarked on ships for Chios. During the war, the regiment enjoyed a formidable reputation among the Turks: the regiment was known as Şeytan asker ("Satan's army"), and Plastiras as Karapiper ("black pepper").

==== September 1922 Revolution and demobilization ====
The military units that escaped the disaster in Asia Minor launched the anti-royalist 11 September 1922 Revolution, headed by Plastiras, Colonel Stylianos Gonatas as representative of the army units in Lesbos and Commander Dimitrios Fokas as representative of the Navy.

The 5/42 Regiment embarked at Chios on the same day, and arrived at Lavrion on the evening of 15 September, along with other army units. Following the renewed resignation of King Constantine I, the revolutionary army units disembarked at Piraeus and Faliron. The new revolutionary government ordered the demobilization of I Army Corps, and the dismissal of the oldest reserve classes. As a result, the 5/42 Regiment demobilized and returned to its peacetime garrison at Lamia.

=== Interwar period ===
The 5/42 Regiment remained at its garrison in Lamia throughout the interwar period, which in Greece saw the establishment short-lived and troubled Second Hellenic Republic (1924–1935).

Its history during this period is obscure, but it does not appear to have taken part in the frequent coups and counter-coups of the period, until the Venizelist coup attempt of 1 March 1935 against the conservative and pro-royalist government. As part of the coup, which was led by none other than Plastiras, IV Army Corps in eastern Macedonia mutinied. General Georgios Kondylis, the Minister for Military Affairs, mobilized forces against the rebels, including a thousand-strong detachment from the 5/42 Regiment under its deputy commander, Panagiotis Raftodimos. The detachment arrived by rail at the village of Kalokastro, near the Strymon River, on 3 March, and bivouacked in a ravine. It took part in the forced crossing of the river on 10 March, and arrived near Serres by afternoon. Following this attack, the rebel leadership gave up and fled to Bulgaria on 11 March, signalling the collapse of the coup. The Evzones then returned to Lamia by rail.

On 4 September 1935, as part of a reorganization of the Army, the regiment received the new designation 42nd Evzone Regiment (42ο Σύνταγμα Ευζώνων, 42 ΣΕ).

On 28 November 1935, the late Queen Sophia, the mother of the reigning King George II, was declared the regiment's honorary colonel-in-chief. Its men thereafter wore the royal cypher, a capital sigma topped by a crown (golden for staff officers, silver for junior officers, red for NCOs and other ranks), on their epaulettes.

=== Greco-Italian War ===
==== Mobilization and march to the Albanian border ====
The probability of an Italian attack increased over the summer of 1940 after a series of provocations culminating in the sinking of the cruiser Elli by an Italian submarine on 15 August. As a result, on 27 August – 2 September the regiment began secret mobilization through individual call-up papers, which from 29 August was complemented by a full, public mobilization. The regimental commander at this time was Colonel Ippokratis Papadimitropoulos. He remained in command until 4 December 1940, when he was replaced by Col. Georgios Papageorgiou. Col. Papageorgiou led the regiment until 6 March 1941. The identity of his replacement is unknown.

On 3 September, the regiment began moving towards the border with Albania (under Italian control since 1939). Battalion by battalion was moved by train to Kalambaka, and thence marched through Metsovo and Ioannina to Delvinaki. The move was completed on 8 September. The regiment came under the command of the local 8th Infantry Division, with the following disposition: 1st Battalion at Zitsa, 2nd Battalion plus an artillery section as a covering force in the Ktismata–Delvinaki area, and 3rd Battalion in the Sitaria–Parakalamos area.

==== Repulsion of the Italian offensive ====
Along with the neighbouring 15th Infantry Regiment, the 42nd Regiment faced the Italian armoured division Centauro. The Italian invasion of Greece began on 28 October with an artillery bombardment followed by an infantry attack against the regiment's covering elements. As a result, the 2nd Battalion withdrew to the south of Delvinaki, and on the next day regrouped at Mazaraki. On the same day, the regiment established its three battalions in defensive positions along the line Chavos Height–Makrynoros–Sossinou Monastery–Repetista. From 30 October to 4 November, the regiment withstood enemy bombardment and repulsed minor Italian attacks, while strengthening its positions. On the night of 4/5 November, the regiment was ordered to retreat to a line between Agios Ilias height and Vrontismeni. 1st and 3rd Battalion, along with the 2nd Machine-Gun Battalion, were deployed on the line, while 2nd Battalion was kept in reserve. The new line was kept under bombardment for two consecutive days, but on the night of 10/11 November, the regiment carried out a reconnaissance in force towards the Siastis height that resulted in the capture of 90 prisoners.

==== Counterattack into Albania ====
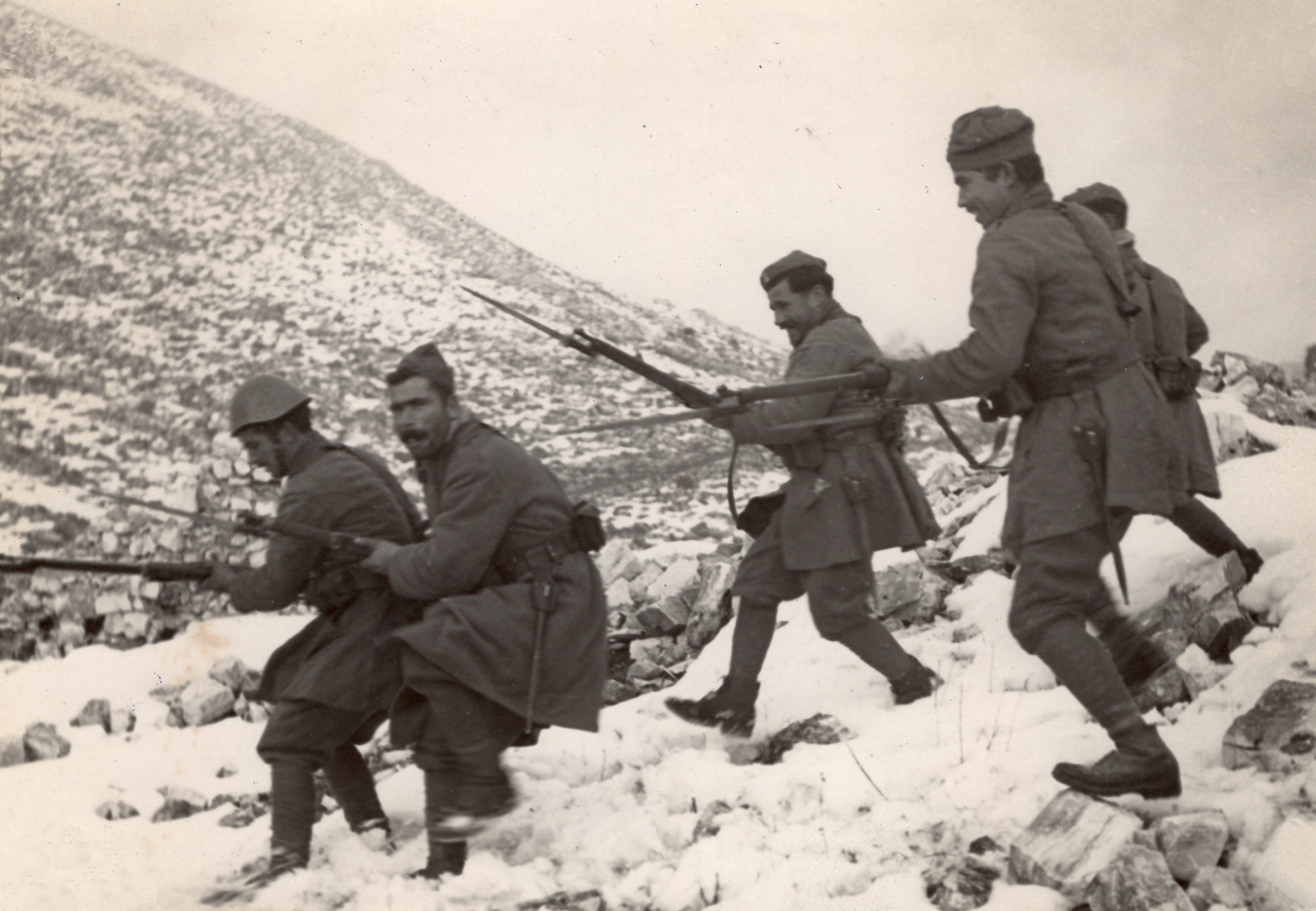
Evzones on the Albanian front, winter of 1940/41

On 13 November, as part of the general Greek counter-offensive, the 42nd Regiment advanced towards the direction of Kouklioi and Sossinou Monastery. On 14–17 November the regiment advanced up to the heights north of Kouklioi and Grimbiani, and recaptured the villages of Repetista, Sitaria, and Kryoneri. On the evening of the 17th, the regiment was reinforced with the 3rd Battalion/36th Infantry Regiment. On 18–20 November, the Evzones took the Profitis Ilias and Rouitsa heights by storm, capturing 350 prisoners, 45 mules and 4 machine guns, along with relevant materiel. On 20 November the regiment retook control of the Delvinaki pass and 2nd Battalion moved north into Pogoni. During the next five days the regiment advanced in a three-pronged attack to Ktismata, Zavrocho, and the heights above Teriachi. The regiment continued its advance with multiple offensive actions, and captured the heights east of the villages of Argyrochori, Chrysodouli, and Agios Nikolaos by 30 November. It failed, however, to capture Height 669. The height was finally captured on 5 December after successive attacks.

From 6 December the regiment was withdrawn from the front line and moved north to the Ano Episkopi–Kato Episkopi area for rest, except for 1st Battalion, which was assigned to the 3rd Infantry Division, and the 2nd Battalion, which was assigned to I Army Corps. On 9 December the 3rd Battalion/36th Regiment rejoined its parent unit. On 29–31 December the regiment marched from Episkopi through Lazarat, Gjirokastër, and Çepunë to Kolonjë. There it went into quarters, and took over command of the 1st Battalion/40th Evzone Regiment as well. On 1–2 January 1941, the 3rd Battalion was moved to the front sector held by the 11th Infantry Regiment in the Mali Shpat heights south of Tepelenë. There it launched an attack on 3 January, but it failed with heavy casualties. On 4–5 January, 1st Battalion too was moved to the Mali Shpat sector, replacing elements of the 8th Infantry Regiment. The regiment took over the sector held by 11th Regiment, which was moved to the rear. The regiment held its positions until 26 January. The heavy winter weather reduced activity on both sides apart from an attack launched on 16 January by 1st Battalion, which failed due to the strong Italian defences. On 27 January, the regiment was replaced at the front by the 85th Infantry Regiment and withdrawn to the rear in the Kolonjë–Golem area for rest and recuperation. In early February, 2nd Battalion was released from I Army Corps and rejoined the regiment.

==== Retreat and disbandment ====
On 12 March, the regiment, reinforced with 1st Battalion/40th Regiment, again took over the front sector of northern Mali Shpat, replacing the 85th Regiment. On 24 March, the regiment's 1st Battalion returned from its assignment to 3rd Division, allowing the 1st Battalion/40th Regiment to return to its parent unit. During this period, the Italian forces launched a number of attacks on the regiment's lines, but were repulsed. On 13–15 April, however, with heavy artillery support, the Italians managed to break through the 9th Company (3rd Battalion). The regiment launched a counterattack, but the Greek artillery was unable to offer support due to lack of shells, and the operation failed. The front was finally plugged by reinforcements from the 34th Infantry Regiment.

Following the start of the German invasion of Greece on 6 April and the rapid progress of the German troops with the capture of Thessaloniki three days later, on 12 April the Greek high command in Athens gave the order of retreat to the Greek forces on the Albanian front. On 16 April, the regiment began its withdrawal on the orders of 8th Division, from Mali Shpat to Kolonjë, Kardhiq, and Çepunë, and established new positions on the heights north of the Gjirokastër barracks on the 16th. The regiment repelled new enemy attacks on 18 April, but on the same night was ordered to withdraw. The regiment retreated from Gjirokastër, to the area of Bularat and Vodhinë, establishing new positions north and west of Vodhinë. Elsewhere the German advance, the lack of motor transport, and the sheer physical exhaustion of the Greek forces meant that the ordered retreat descended into chaos; over the next days, commanders reported signs of disintegration among some Greek units. As a result, on 20 April Lt. General Georgios Tsolakoglou made contact with the German army (the Leibstandarte SS Adolf Hitler brigade) and signed a protocol of surrender of the Greek army in Epirus. The 42nd Regiment maintained its position, repelling an Italian attack on 20 April, but on the same evening, it received news of the armistice. Despite the armistice, the Italians attacked on the next day, but were repulsed.

On 22 April the regiment recommenced its southward retreat to Krioner. On the 23rd it crossed the pre-war border, moving through Kouklioi and Mazaraki to Zitsa. On 24 April it moved to the village of Grammeno and then the village of Dramesioi. The regiment remained there on 25–26 April, gathering its weapons and materiel and, following orders by 8th Division, storing it in the village school. The keys were deposited in the local Gendarmerie station. On 27 April, the regiment began moving south, and arrived in the area of Filippiada on the 30th. There those soldiers who desired to, were released to return home as best they could. The remainder of the regiment moved to Arta and Amfilochia. On 3 May, the regiment was allowed to disband; over the next three days its men returned to Lamia via Karpenisi and Lianokladi.

=== Axis occupation and resistance ===
During the subsequent Axis occupation of Greece, in April 1943 Colonel Dimitrios Psarros re-founded the 5/42 Evzone Regiment as the armed wing of the National and Social Liberation (EKKA) resistance group. The unit remained active until forcibly dissolved by the rival Greek People's Liberation Army (ELAS) in April 1944. Psarros was killed while in ELAS custody.

=== Greek Civil War and postwar period ===
In April 1948, the 53rd Brigade (53η Ταξιαρχία) was formed at Larissa, with the 593rd, 601st, and 603rd Infantry Battalions, as part of II Army Corps. In summer 1948, it fought in the Battle of Grammos–Vitsi. From September 1948 it became an integral part of the 1st Infantry Division. As such it was assigned to I Army Corps in 1949 and participated in the decisive Operation Pyrsos, that expelled the communist forces from their strongholds on Grammos and Vitsi and ended the civil war in a government victory.

On 30 April 1951, the 53rd Brigade was renamed into 5/42 Infantry Regiment, based at Kolokouri near Katerini, under the command of the 1st Infantry Division. The regiment remained active until disbanded on 26 June 1954.

The unit was reactivated as a reserve formation on 1 January 1979 at Veroia in replacement of the 81st Infantry Regiment, and moved to Skydra in December. In November 2000 it received the honorific title "Delvinaki". Since January 2003 it forms the garrison of the Dodecanese island of Kalymnos. It is a battalion-sized formation under the 80th National Guard Higher Command.

== Sources ==
- 5/42 Infantry Regiment, 3rd Staff Bureau (14 April 1981), Material on Unit History (in Greek), Hellenic Army General Staff, Army History Directorate
- Balomenos, Konstantinos (2012). Σύντομη ιστορία του 5/42 Συντάγματος Ευζώνων της Λαμίας [Concise History of the 5/42 Evzone Regiment of Lamia] (PDF) (in Greek). Lamia: Lamiakos Typos.
- Hellenic Army General Staff, Army History Directorate, 6th Bureau (15 May 1958), Συνοπτικόν Ἰστορικόν Σημείωμα τοῡ 5/42 Συντάγματος Εὐζώνων [Brief Historical Note of the 5/42 Evzone Regiment] (in Greek), Hellenic Army General Staff, Army History Directorate
- Knox, MacGregor (1986). Mussolini Unleashed 1939–1941. Politics and Strategy in Fascist Italy's Last War. Cambridge: Cambridge University Press. ISBN 0-521-33835-2.
- Koliopoulos, Ioannis (1978). "Ο Πόλεμος του 1940/1941" [The War of 1940/1941]. In Christopoulos, Georgios A. & Bastias, Ioannis K. (eds.). Ιστορία του Ελληνικού Έθνους [History of the Greek Nation] (in Greek). Vol. ΙΕ: Νεώτερος Ελληνισμός από το 1913 έως το 1941 [Modern Hellenism from 1913 to 1941]. Athens: Ekdotiki Athinon. pp. 411–453. ISBN 978-960-213-111-4.
- Mamarelis, Argyrios (2003). Rise and fall of the 5/42 regiment of Evzones: A study on national resistance and civil war in Greece, 1941-1944 (PhD thesis). London School of Economics and Political Science.
- Petraki, Marina (2014). 1940: Ο άγνωστος πόλεμος. Η ελληνική πολεμική προσπάθεια στα μετόπισθεν [1940: The Unknown War. The Greek War Effort in the Rear] (in Greek). Athens: Patakis Editions. ISBN 978-960-16-6026-4.
