= Hellenic Army Supreme Military Support Command =

Supreme Military Support Command Ανώτατη Στρατιωτική Διοίκηση Υποστήριξης Στρατού ΑΣΔΥΣ
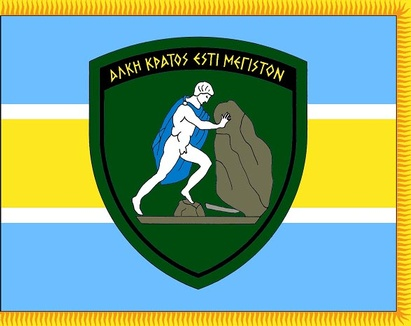
- Emblem of the ΑΣΔΥΣ
- Active: 1955–1975; 1979–present
- Country: Greece
- Branch: Hellenic Army
- Size: Army Corps
- Garrison/HQ: Athens, Attica
- Mottos: Courage is greatness Αλκή κράτος εστί μέγιστον Alki kratos esti meyiston

The Supreme Military Support Command (Greek: Ανώτατη Στρατιωτική Διοίκηση Υποστήριξης Στρατού, ΑΣΔΥΣ) is a corps-level military command of the Hellenic Army that provides support for its formations and units.

== Structure ==
- Base Support Command (ΔΥΒ), based at Athens.
- Support Division (ΜΕΡΥΠ), based at Thessaloniki
- Strategic Transport Unit (Συγκρότημα Στρατηγικών Μεταφορών), based at Assiros, Macedonia
  - 4th Support Brigade (4η ΤΑΞΥΠ), based at Xanthi, Thrace
- 651 Army Material Depot (651 ΑΒΥΠ), based at Agios Stefanos, Attica
- Military Factories Command (ΔΙΣΕ), based at Athens, Attica divided in
  - 301st Base Factory (301 ΕΒ), based at Agioi Anargyroi, Attica
  - 303rd Base Factory (303 ΠΕΒ), based at Larissa, Thessaly
  - 304th Base Factory (304 ΠΕΒ), based at Velestino, Thessaly
  - 306th Telecommunications Depot Maintenance (306 EBT), based at Acharnes, Attica
  - 308th Base Factory (308 ΠΕΒ), based at Thessaloniki, Macedonia
  - 700 Military Factory (700 ΣΕ), based at Keratsini, Attica
- 4th Infantry Division, based at Tripoli, Arcadia
  - 2/39 Evzone Regiment, based at Messologi.
  - 11th Infantry Regiment, based at Tripoli
  - Communications Corps Training Centre (ΚΕΔΒ), based at Haidari
  - Engineer Corps Training Centre (ΚΕΜΧ), based at Patras
  - Supply-Transport Corps Training Centre (ΚΕΕΜ), based at Sparta
  - Telecommunications Technicians Training School (ΣΕΤΤΗΛ), based at Pyrgos
- Military hospitals
  - 401st Athens Army General Hospital (401 ΓΣΝΑ) at Athens
  - 411th Army General Hospital (411 ΓΣΝ)
  - 417th Army Pension Fund Hospital (417 ΝΙΜΤΣ)
  - 414th Army Special Diseases Hospital (414 ΣΝΕΝ) at Penteli
  - 424th Army General Training Hospital (424 ΓΣΝΕ)
