= Greek capture of Thessaloniki =

Part of the First Balkan War in 1912

- Part of First Balkan War
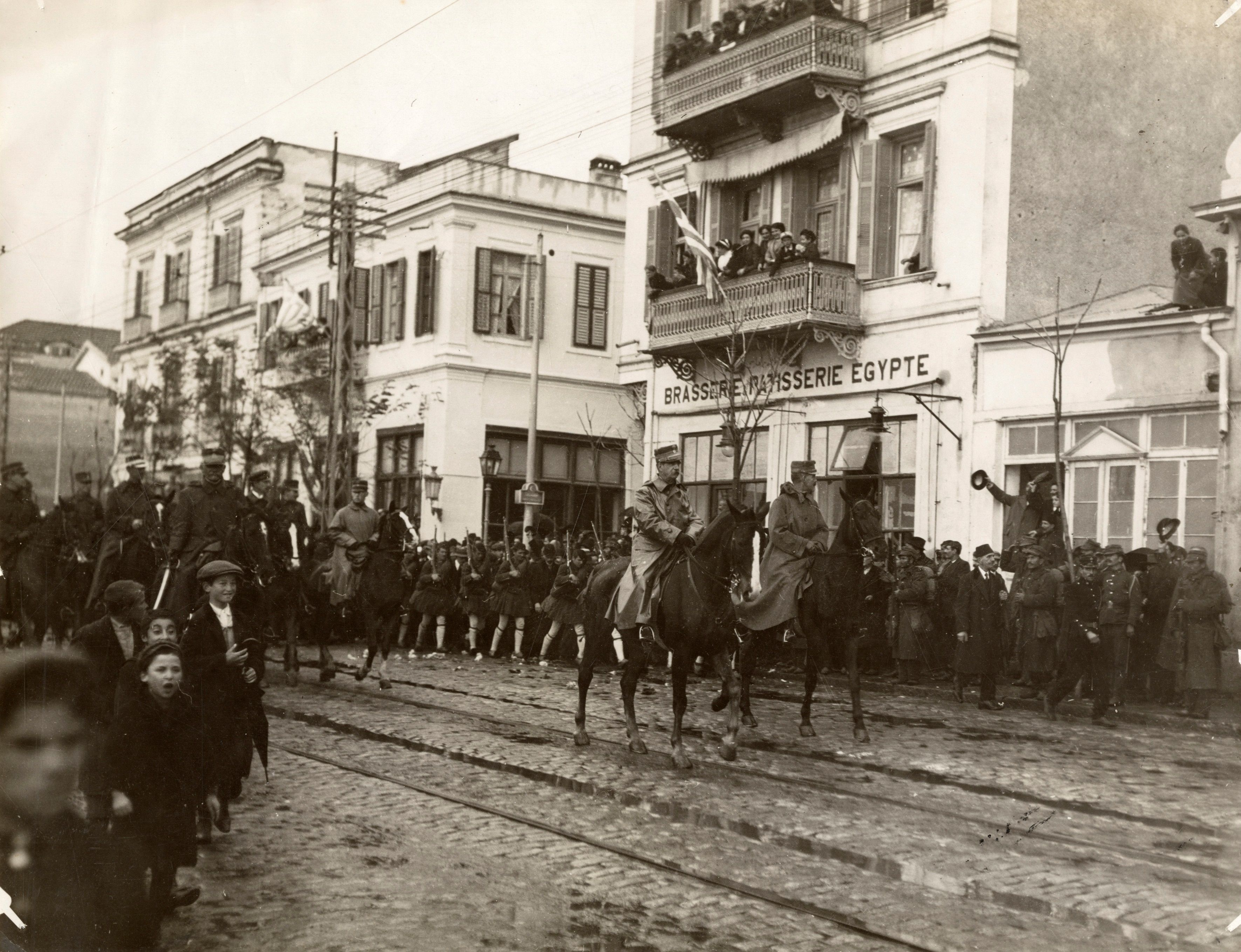
- The entry of King George and Crown Prince Constantine into Thessaloniki (October 29, 1912)
Date	27–28 October 1912
Location	Thessaloniki,Greece
Result	Handover of Thessaloniki to the Greeks

Belligerents
Kingdom of Greece	Ottoman Empire

Commanders and leaders
(Kingdom of Greece) Constantine I of Greece (Kingdom of Greece) George I of Greece	(Ottoman Empire) Hasan Tahsin Pasha

Casualties and losses
	25,000 prisoners

The city of Thessaloniki (or Salonica) was captured by Greece during the First Balkan War on 27 and 28 October 1912, as part of its advance into Ottoman territory in competition against the rival advances of Bulgaria. The Greek entry into the city followed the victorious battles of the Greeks at Giannitsa and Sarantaporos. On 20 October, the Greek forces under the orders of the crown prince Constantine first headed towards Northern Epirus. However, after a strong disagreement between Constantine and prime minister Eleftherios Venizelos, the Greek troops were led to target Thessaloniki instead, in order to prevent the advance of the Bulgarians, who were interested in capturing the city in order to have access to the Aegean. The Ottoman general of Thessaloniki, Hasan Tahsin Pasha, surrendered the city to Greece, unconditionally and along with 25,000 prisoners, in an agreement signed in the village of Topsin (present-day Thessaloniki Bridge ).

== Advance towards Thessaloniki ==
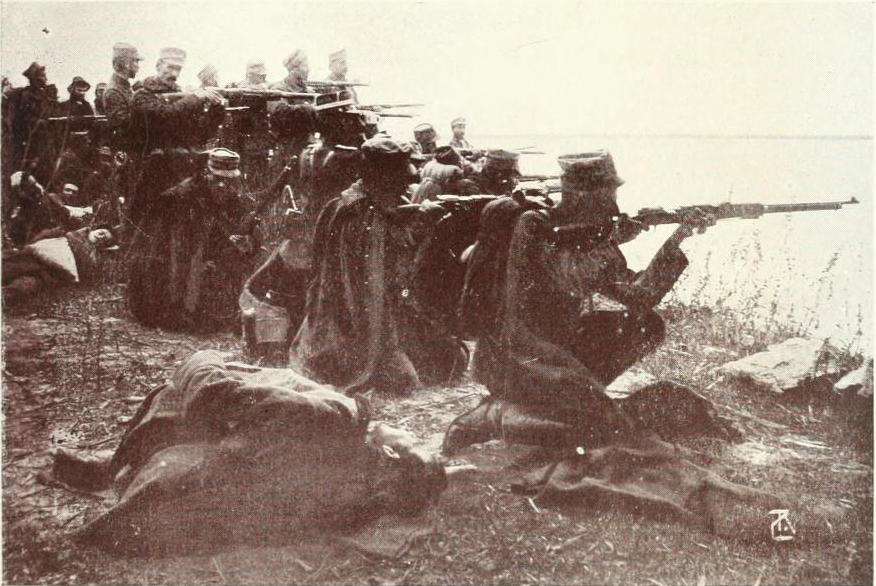
Greek soldiers in the battle of Giannitsa.

With the outbreak of the First Balkan War, the countries of the Balkan League attacked the Ottoman Empire and began to advance into its territory. The Greeks, after managing to advance towards Macedonia, headed towards Thessaloniki, because at that time Macedonia was a point of conflict between Greeks and Bulgarians for dominance in the region. The Greek troops of Thessaly and Macedonia received orders from Prime Minister Eleftherios Venizelos and King George I to move rapidly towards Thessaloniki, before the Bulgarian military forces arrived. The Thessalian troops, under the orders of King George I, moved further north and after the Battle of Giannitsa they arrived outside Thessaloniki, while the Macedonian troops headed further south, under the orders of Venizelos and after the Battle of Sarantaporos they also arrived in Thessaloniki. The Turkish forces, after the defeat at Sarantaporos, headed to Giannitsa, fighting a defensive battle to stop the Greek advance towards Thessaloniki, but the Greek army won the battle and advanced towards the city. On 25 October 1912, the Greek troops had surrounded the city.

== City surrender ==
On 26 October, Hasan Tahsin Pasha agreed to discuss the terms of surrendering Thessaloniki to the Greeks, while Constantine assured the Bulgarian army, which was 20 kilometres outside Thessaloniki, that the Greeks would enter the city that day and advised them to change direction.

On the afternoon of the 26th, news reached Athens via an unsigned telegram to the Ministry of War from the king's telegraph service, based in Gida (now Alexandria), that the Greek army had entered Thessaloniki. The news spread throughout Athens, provoking joyous celebrations with the ringing of bells, hymns and prayers in churches, demonstrations in the city centre and the decoration and illumination of the city by order of the mayor, Spyridon Mercouris. As the telegram was unsigned and he himself could not verify it, Venizelos refused to appear before the cheering crowd and in the evening informed representatives of the trade associations that the city had not yet come under Greek rule, while he promised them that, as soon as he received relevant information, one hundred and one cannon shots would be fired from the Pnyx. A government statement at 3 am on the 27th denied the news of the capture of the city, resulting in the cancellation of the planned doxology at the Metropolis.

Λιθογραφίες της παράδοσης της Θεσσαλονίκης
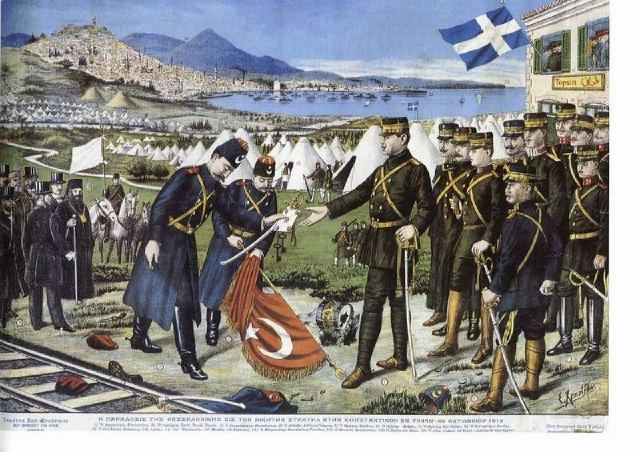
Lithograph by Sotiris Christidis

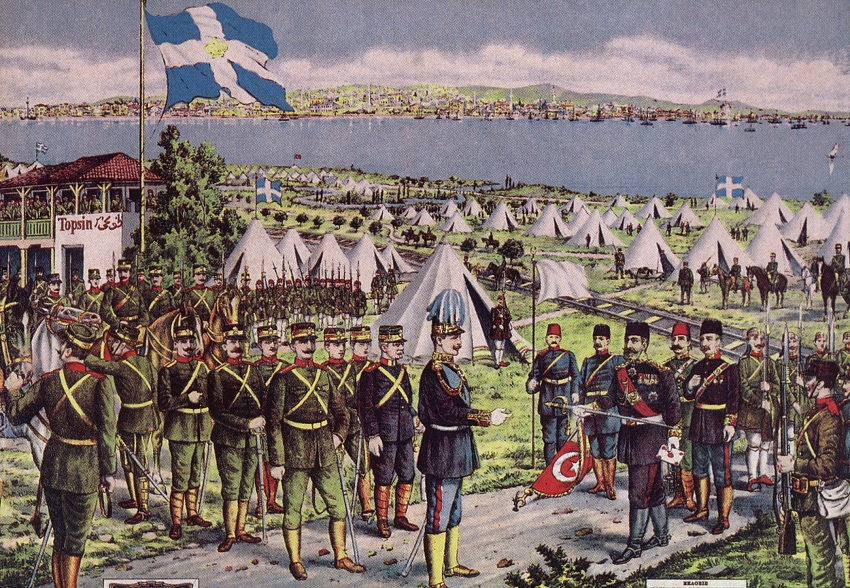
Lithograph by Karl Haupt

On 27 October, due to the threat from the Bulgarians, Hasan Tahsin Pasha was forced to sign the protocol of surrender of Thessaloniki to the Greeks, which was backdated to the 26th to mislead the Bulgarian side. Tahsin surrendered the city to the Greeks unconditionally and gave 25,000 prisoners. In the afternoon, a detachment of Greek soldiers crossed the deserted coastal avenue and camped outside the city, while in the evening the Bulgarian general Todorov, after being informed of the surrender of the city and realizing the Greek-Turkish cooperation, requested a surrender protocol from Tahsin Pasha, who referred him to the Greek side. However, as the city remained under Turkish control, Todorov decided to capture it the next morning.

To forestall the Bulgarian army's entry, Constantine was transported by train to the city's railway station and from there to the Commanding General before dawn on 28 October. He received the 1st Division from the railway station and attended a doxology. Fulfilling Venizelos' promise, at 9:30 on the morning of 28 October, one hundred and one cannon shots were fired from the Pnyx.

On 29 October, an official changing of the guard ceremony was held with a grand parade led by King George, who came from Gida, and Constantine, while the Greek flag was raised on the White Tower.

The Greek territory in Macedonia was the cause of the Second Balkan War because the Bulgarians were not satisfied with the territories they occupied.
