= Stephanos =

Stephanos or Stefanos, in Greek Στέφανος, is a masculine given name derived from the Greek word στέφανος (stéphanos), meaning "wreath, crown" and by extension "reward, honor, renown, fame", from the verb στέφειν (stéphein), "to encircle, to wreathe". In Ancient Greece, crowning wreaths (such as laurel wreaths) were given to the winners of contests. Originally, as the verb suggests, the noun had a more general meaning of any "circle"—including a circle of people, a circling wall around a city, and, in its earliest recorded use, the circle of a fight, which is found in the Iliad of Homer. The English equivalent is Stephen.

People or biblical figures with the given name include:

Antiquity & Middle Ages (chronologically)

- Saint Stephen (Greek: Stéphanos) (c. AD 5-c. 34), considered the first Christian martyr
- Stephanos Byzantios, 6th-century author of a geographical dictionary
- Stephanos of Alexandria (fl. c. 580–c. 640), Byzantine philosopher and teacher
- Stephanos Sahlikis (1330–after 1391), Cretan satirical poet
- Stephanos Tzangarolas (1660-1675–1710), Greek painter of the late Cretan Renaissance

Modern period (alphabetically)

- Stephanos, primate of Tallinn (born 1940), primate of the Orthodox Church of Estonia since 1999
- Stephanos Bibas (born 1969), United States circuit judge and professor of law and criminology
- Stephanos Christopoulos (1876–after 1906), Greek wrestler and weightlifter
- Stefanos Dedas (born 1982), Greek professional basketball head coach
- Stefanos Dragoumis (1842–1923), Greek judge, writer and Prime Minister of Greece in 1910
- Stefanos Gennadis (1858-1922), Greek general
- Stefanos Kapino (born 1994), Greek football goalkeeper
- Stefanos Kasselakis (born 1988), Greek businessman, entrepreneur and politician
- Stephanos Mousouros, Ottoman-appointed Prince of Samos from 1896 to 1899
- Stephanos Papadopoulos (born 1976), Greek-American poet
- Stephanos Stephanides (born 1951), Cypriot-born author, poet, translator, critic, ethnographer and documentary filmmaker
- Stephanos Theodosius (1924–2007), Bishop of the Calcutta diocese of the Malankara Orthodox Church
- Stefanos Tsitsipas (born 1998), Greek tennis player
