= Konstantinos Moschopoulos =

Lieutenant General Konstantinos Moschopoulos
- Κωνσταντίνος Μοσχόπουλος
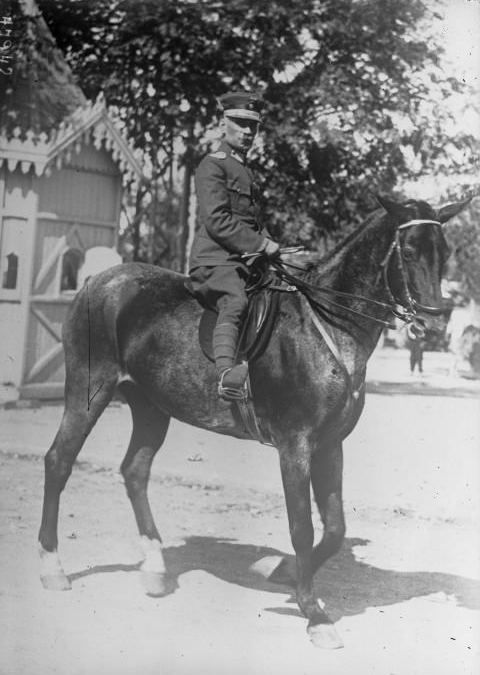
- Konstantinos Moschopoulos c. 1916
- Born: 1854; Constantinople, Ottoman Empire (now Istanbul, Turkey)
- Died: 1942; Kingdom of Greece
- Education: Hellenic Army Academy
- Military career
- Allegiance: Kingdom of Greece
- Branch: Hellenic Army
- Service years: 1877–1920
- Rank: Lieutenant General
- Commands: 4th Infantry Division; III Army Corps; Chief of Hellenic Army General Staff
- Wars: Greco-Turkish War (1897); Balkan Wars; First Balkan War; Battle of Sarantaporo; Battle of Yenidje; Battle of Bizani; Second Balkan War; Battle of Kilkis-Lachanas
- Other work: Governor-General of Thessaloniki

Konstantinos Moschopoulos (Greek: Κωνσταντίνος Μοσχόπουλος; c. 1854–1942) was a senior officer of the Hellenic Army who distinguished himself in the Balkan Wars of 1912–1913 and served as Chief of the Hellenic Army General Staff.

== Life ==
He was born in Istanbul in about 1854, studied at the Hellenic Military Academy and graduated in 1877 as an artillery ensign. He was promoted to 2nd Lieutenant on 28 September 1879, to lieutenant in 1882 and to captain in 1886. In the Greco-Turkish War of 1897, he commanded a battery. After the war he was promoted to major (1898), lieutenant colonel (1906) and colonel (1910). During this time he served for a time as head of the Artillery School, chief of the Athens Gendarmerie, Athens garrison commander, and commander of an artillery regiment.

Promoted to major general in 1912, during the First Balkan War he commanded the 4th Infantry Division, which played a crucial role in the Greek victory at the Battle of Sarantaporo by flanking the Turkish positions, as well as at the Battle of Giannitsa. After the capitulation of the VIII Ottoman Provisional Corps at Thessaloniki, Moschopoulos and his division were transferred to the Army of Epirus. On 4–6 January he substituted for Lt Gen Konstantinos Sapountzakis as commander of the Army of Epirus. During the second Greek assault against the Ioannina fortified zone on 7 January 1913, Moschopoulos commanded the right (eastern) flank, comprising the 4th Division and the Epirus Division. During the final Greek offensive, Moschopoulos commanded the Second Army Detachment on the army's left (western) flank, which executed the main attack against the forts around Ioannina.

During the Second Balkan War against Bulgaria, Moschopoulos continued to lead the 4th Division, fighting in the Battle of Kilkis-Lahanas. During the final phases of the war he commanded the Moschopoulos Army Detachment (Τμήμα Στρατιάς Μοσχοπούλου), grouping the 4th and 2nd Divisions. The future general and academic, Alexandros Mazarakis-Ainian, who served briefly under him in the 4th Field Battery during the lead-up to the 1897 war, describes him as "not distinguished in education or industriousness", but a successful commander during the Balkan Wars because he "was willing to listen to other opinions, was optimistic, and took risks".

After the war, he was promoted to lieutenant general and given command of the newly established III Army Corps at Thessaloniki. From 13 August to 11 November 1916, he served as Chief of the Army Staff Service, and in 1917, he was appointed as Military Governor of Epirus and Corfu. He retired on 25 April 1920.

In 1922, he served as Governor-General of Thessaloniki.

He died in 1942.

== Sources ==
- Συνοπτική Ιστορία του Γενικού Επιτελείου Στρατού 1901–2001 [A Concise History of the Hellenic Army General Staff 1901–2001] (in Greek). Athens: Hellenic Army History Directorate. 2001. ISBN 960-7897-44-7.
