= Biovizhdë =

Village in Gjirokastër County, Albania

Biovizhdë Βαλοβίστα
- Village
- Location within Albania
- Coordinates: 40°5′51″N 20°32′8″E
- Country: Albania
- County: Gjirokastër
- Municipality: Përmet
- Administrative unit: Çarçovë
- Elevation: 518 m (1,699 ft)
- Time zone: UTC+1 (CET)
  - Summer (DST): UTC+2 (CEST)

Biovizhdë (Albanian definite form: Biovizhda, Greek: Βαλοβίστα) is a village in Gjirokastër County, southern Albania. At the 2015 local government reform it became part of the municipality of Përmet. The village is located in the valley of the Vjosa river.

== Name ==
The toponym Biovizhdë is derived from the personal name Биовидъ, Biovida and the suffix jъ, ya, with the Bulgarian sound change d and y into zhd. Linguist Xhelal Ylli says the formation of the personal name is unclear and is possibly a hybrid name.

== Demographics ==
Biovizhdë has a notable Greek presence. There is also a significant Aromanian minority population. Their presence was originally temporary, related to their transhumant lifestyle, before becoming permanent in the village. Some Biovizhdë Aromanians have migrated to southern Albanian cities.
