= Çarçovë =

Çarçovë Τσαρτσόβα Ciarshova
- Administrative unit
- Location within Albania
- Coordinates: 40°7′N 20°32′E
- Country: Albania
- County: Gjirokastër
- Municipality: Përmet

Population (2011)
  - Total: 918
- Time zone: UTC+1 (CET)
  - Summer (DST): UTC+2 (CEST)

Çarçovë (also Çarshovë) is a village, a municipal unit and a former municipality in the Gjirokastër County, southern Albania.

== Name ==
In Greek, the village is known as Τσαρτσόβα (Tsartsova) or Κεράσοβο/Kerasovo. In Aromanian, it is known as Ciarshova.

== Demographics ==
The population of the former municipality at the 2011 census was 918. The total number of registered citizens of Çarçovë is 2.969 as of 2019. At the 2015 local government reform it became a subdivision of the municipality Përmet. The municipal unit consists of the villages Çarçovë, Vllaho-Psilloterë, Biovizhdë, Zhepë, Draçovë, Iliar-Munushtir, Strëmbec, Pëllumbar and Kanikol. The town of Çarçovë also has Greek and Aromanian communities. Two villages in the former municipality of Çarçovë, Biovizhdë and Vllaho-Psilloterë, are predominantly Greek speaking. In Biovizhdë there is also a significant Aromanian minority population. Their presence was originally temporary, related to their transhumant lifestyle, before becoming permanent in the village. According to a 2014 report by the Albanian government, there were 245 ethnic Greeks in Vllaho-Psilloterë and 200 in Biovizhdë in the total number of registered citizens. Some Biovizhdë Aromanians have migrated to southern Albanian cities. In Vllaho-Psilloterë, three Muslim Albanian families used to live there with a single member from one family still remaining in the early 2010s. Some Greek speakers also exist in the nearby villages of Zhepë and Draçovë. The destroyed village of Mesarë located on the Albanian-Greek border was inhabited by Muslim Albanians.

== Notable people ==
- Hasan Tahsin Pasha, Albanian Pasha from the now ruined village of Mesarë.
