= Hasan Tahsin Pasha =

Senior Ottoman military officer

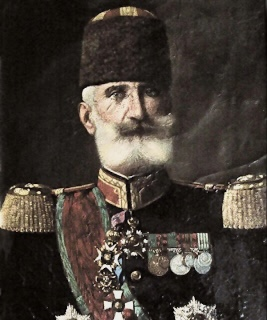
- Born: 1845; Mesare, Ioannina Eyalet, Ottoman Empire (modern Albania)
- Died: 1918 (aged 72–73); Lausanne, Switzerland
- Burial place: Thessaloniki, Greece
- Military career
- Allegiance: Ottoman Empire
- Branch: Ottoman Army
- Service years: 1870–1912
- Rank: Lieutenant general
- Conflicts: Greco-Turkish War of 1897; First Balkan War; Battle of Sarantaporo; Battle of Yenidje

Hasan Tahsin Pasha (1845–1918), also known as Hasan Tahsin Mesarea, was a senior Ottoman Albanian military officer, who served in the Greco-Turkish War of 1897, and in the First Balkan War.

== Biography and career ==
Hasan Tahsin was an Albanian, born in Mesarë (located in Albania on the border with Greece), which at the time was part of the kaza of Leskovik. During his youth, he attended and graduated from the Greek Zosimaia School at Ioannina, and spoke Greek fluently. He began service as a gendarme ca. 1870 in Katerini, and later joined the Ottoman Army as an NCO. He soon received a commission as an officer, and by 1881 he commanded the Ottoman Gendarmerie at Ioannina. During the Greco-Turkish War of 1897, he commanded the 6th Trabzon Division, and around 1900, he was placed as garrison commander of Thessaloniki. In 1908–1910, he served as the governor of Yemen before returning to Thessaloniki, where he assumed the post of commanding officer of the III Corps with the rank of Ferik (Lieutenant General). After his retirement in 1912, he was persuaded to return to duty as governor-general of the Ioannina Vilayet.

As tensions with the Balkan League grew at however over the summer of 1912, he was switched to command the VIII Provisional Corps at Thessaloniki. After the outbreak of the First Balkan War, he led his forces against the Greek Army of Thessaly under Crown Prince Constantine. The Greek army, better prepared and outnumbering his own forces, defeated VIII Corps in the battles of Sarantaporo and Yenidje. Surrounded and blockaded in Thessaloniki and with no hope of outside succor, and learning of the approach of the 7th Bulgarian Division from the northeast, Hasan Tahsin resolved to surrender the Thessaloniki fortress and his 26,000 men to the Greeks. After a few days of negotiations, a surrender protocol was signed on 8 November [O.S. 26 October] 1912, with the handover carried out the next day. The Ottoman side immediately considered him a traitor for the loss of this important seaport city, and a court martial gave a death sentence in absentia.

== Exile ==
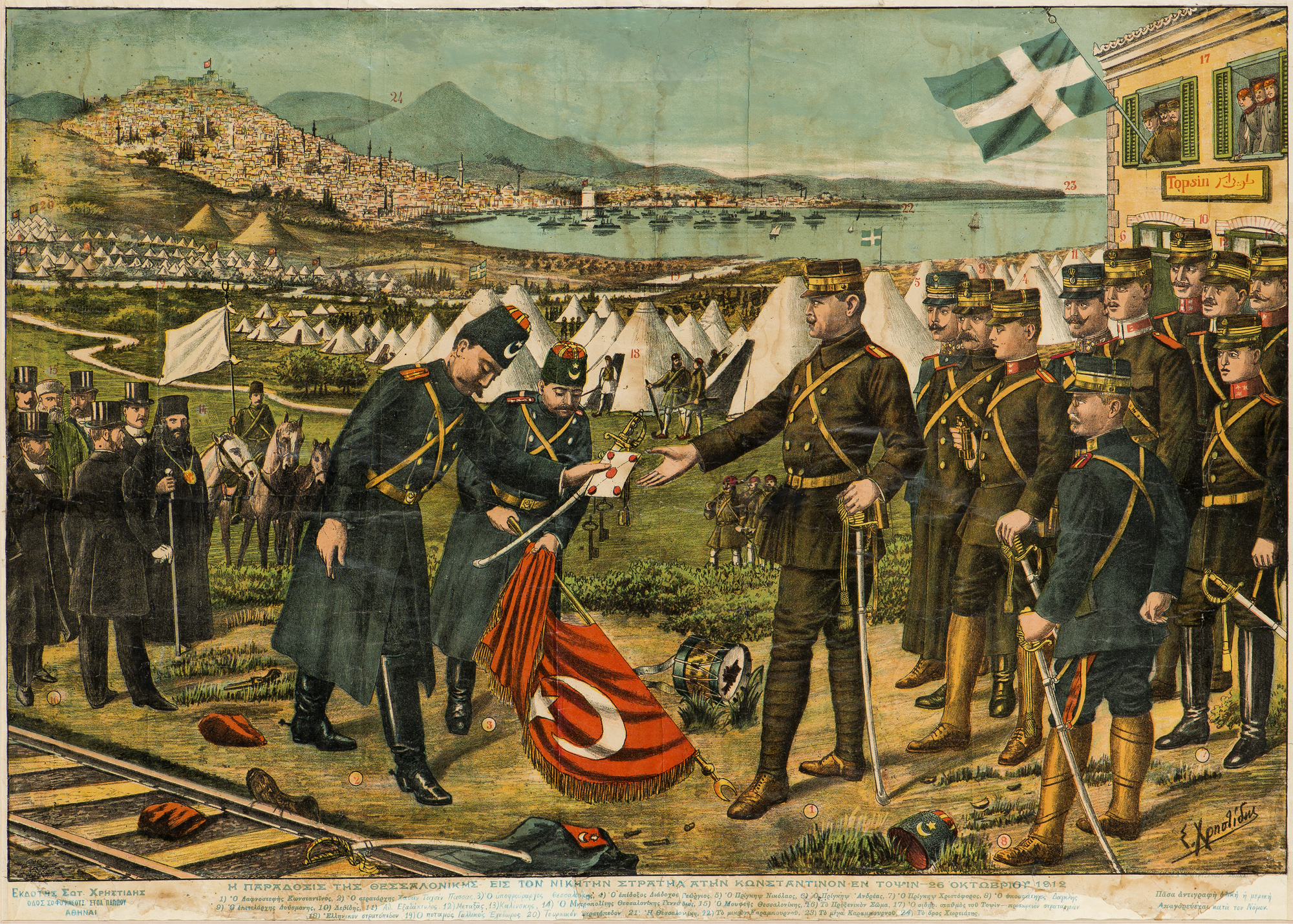
The surrender of Thessaloniki by Hasan Tahsin Pasha (Athens War Museum Collections)

After his release from Greek captivity, he went into exile, first in France and later in Switzerland. He died in Lausanne in 1918 and was buried there. In 1937, his remains were transferred to the Albanian cemetery of Thessaloniki, and in 2006 to the Military Cemetery of the Balkan Wars at Gefyra. Out of his seven children only three lived long lives, two sons and a daughter who got married in Turkey. One of his sons, Kenan Messare (1889–1965), who was his adjutant during the war, became a Greek citizen and a notable painter, known especially for his scenes of battles from the Balkan Wars. The other son Qemal Messare moved to Albania, worked as a functionary in the Ministry of Internal Affairs, in King Zog's Residence, and was appointed Ambassador to Greece in January 1933, where he served until 1934.

== Sources ==
- Nikoltsios, Vassileios; Gounaris, Vassilis K. (2002). Από το Σαραντάπορο στη Θεσσαλονίκη: Η ελληνοτουρκική αναμέτρηση του 1912 μέσα από τις αναμνήσεις του Στρατηγού Χασάν Ταχσίν πασά [From Sarantaporon to Thessaloniki: The Greco-Turkish conflict of 1912 through the memoirs of General Hasan Tahsin Pasha] (in Greek). Thessaloniki. ISBN 960-92042-0-1.
- Christodoulou, Christos K. (27 October 2007). Οι τρεις ταφές του Χασάν Ταχσίν Πασά [The Three Burials of Hasan Tahsin Pasha]. Makedonia (in Greek).
