= Ioannis Damianos =

- Born: 31 January 1861
- Died: 12 June 1920 (aged 59)
- Military career
- Allegiance: Greece
- Branch: Royal Hellenic Navy
- Rank: Rear Admiral
- Wars: Greco-Turkish War of 1897, Balkan Wars
- Other work: Minister for Naval Affairs

Ioannis Damianos (Greek: Ιωάννης Δαμιανός, 1861–1920) was a senior Greek Navy officer who fought in the Balkan Wars of 1912–1913. He was the brother of Konstantinos Damianos.

He was born on 31 January 1861 in Hydra. He served in the Greco-Turkish War of 1897 and in the Balkan Wars of 1912–13 as head of the Ionian Sea squadron and later as head of the cruiser squadron. He also repeatedly held the post of Minister for Naval Affairs.

He retired from service on 20 October 1917 and died on 12 June 1920.
