= Capture of Korytsa =

Part of the First Balkan War (1912)

- Part of the First Balkan War
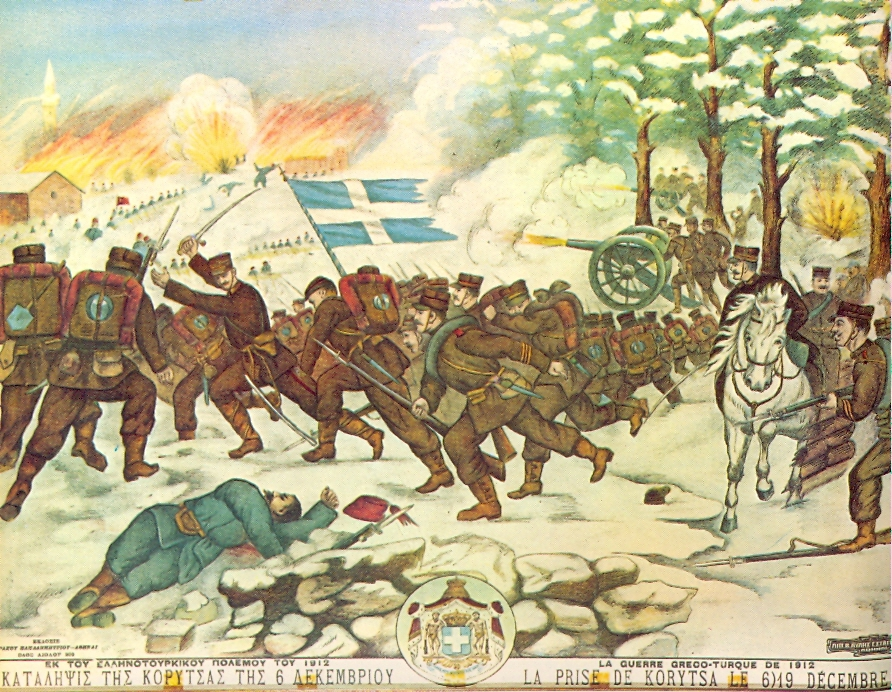
- A Greek lithograph of the capture.
Date	20 December 1912
Location	Korçë, Manastir Vilayet, Ottoman Empire (present-day Albania) 40°36′50.49″N 20°46′40.00″E
Result	Greek victory
Territorial changes	Greeks capture Korçë

Belligerents
Greece	Ottoman Empire

Commanders and leaders
(Kingdom of Greece) Konstantinos Damianos	(Ottoman Empire) Djavit Pasha

Strength
Unknown	24,000

Casualties and losses
Unknown	Unknown

The Capture of Korytsa by the Hellenic armed forces, happened on 20 December 1912, during the First Balkan War.

== Capture ==
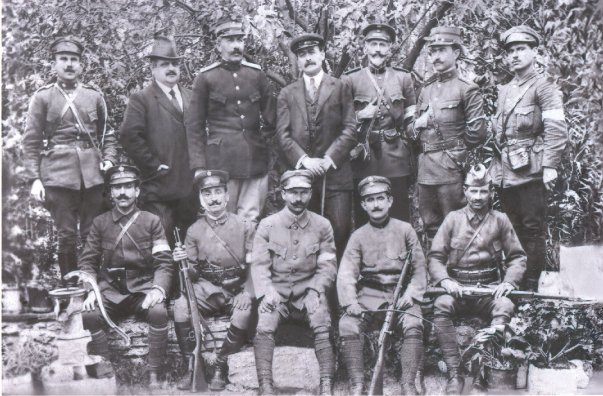
Hellenic army officers in Korçë.

During the early stages of the war while the Balkan allies were victorious, the Hellenic Army liberated Thessaloniki and continued to advance west in Macedonia to Kastoria and then Korçë.

The Epirus front was also active and the Ottoman forces under Djavid Pasha placed 24,000 Ottoman troops in Korçë in order to protect north of Ioannina, the urban center of the Epirus region. On December 20, three days after peace negotiations started, the Greek forces pushed the Ottomans out of Korçë.

This would give the Greek forces a significant advantage in controlling Ioannina and the entire area in March 1913 at the Battle of Bizani.

After Ioannina was captured, the town was visited on 17 May, 1913, by Prince George (later George II of Greece). Prince George was welcomed by the Muslim mayor of the town and he visited a Dervish monastery nearby.
