= Konstantinos Damianos =

Greek Army officer

- Κωνσταντίνος Δαμιανός
- Born: c. 1853; Hydra, Kingdom of Greece
- Died: 23 September 1915; Athens, Kingdom of Greece
- Education: Hellenic Military Academy
- Military career
- Allegiance: Kingdom of Greece
- Branch: Hellenic Army
- Service years: 1878–1915
- Rank: Lieutenant General
- Unit: Army of Epirus
- Commands: 3rd Infantry Division; IV Army Corps
- Wars: Greco-Turkish War (1897); Balkan Wars; First Balkan War; Capture of Korytsa; Second Balkan War; Battle of Doiran
- Awards: Order of the Redeemer

Konstantinos Damianos (Greek: Κωνσταντίνος Δαμιανός, c. 1853–1915) was a senior Hellenic Army officer who fought in the Balkan Wars of 1912–1913. His brother, Ioannis Damianos, also had a distinguished military career.

He was born in Hydra in around 1853, and graduated from the Hellenic Military Academy on 7 February 1878 as an artillery adjutant. He fought in the Epirus front of the Greco-Turkish War of 1897 with the rank of major.

In 1911, he was named CO of the 3rd Infantry Division at Missolonghi, which he also commanded during the Balkan Wars, with the rank of major general. In 1914 he was promoted to lieutenant general and assigned the command of the newly constituted IV Army Corps at Kavala.

He was suspended from active service on 4 April 1915 and died in Athens on 23 September 1915.
