= Medal for Gallantry (Greece) =

Medal for Gallantry Αριστείο Ανδραγαθίας Aristeion Andragathias
- Projected design for the medal
- Type: Military decoration
- Awarded for: Heroic acts on the battlefield
- Presented by: Greece
- Established: 1974
- Ribbon bar of the medal

Precedence
- Next (higher): Order of the Phoenix
- Next (lower): Cross of Valour

The Medal for Gallantry (Greek: Αριστείο Ανδραγαθίας) is the highest military award of Greece. It was instituted in 1974, but has neither been struck nor awarded yet.

This medal may be awarded for proven heroic acts on the battlefield, in the performance of ordered military action in which life was in obvious and immediate danger, or an act which greatly exceeds the performance of duty and draws the admiration and appreciation of superiors, subordinates or the public.
