= Cross of Valour (Greece) =

Cross of Valour Αριστείον Ανδρείας Aristeion Andreias
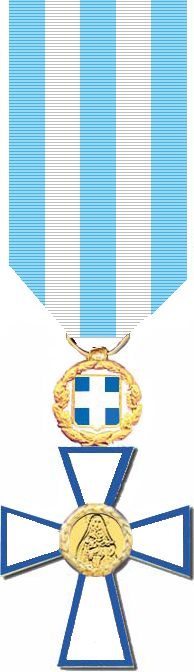
- Gold Cross of the Cross of Valour (1974 version)
- Type: Three-class military decoration
- Awarded for: Bravery or distinguished leadership in wartime
- Presented by: Greece
- Eligibility: Greek military personnel and allies assigned to or with Greek units.
- Motto: ΑΞΙᾼ (For valour)
- Clasps: 1940
- Status: Instituted but inactive (wartime award only)
- Established: 13 May 1913
- Final award: 21 December 1953

Highlights
- Total: 59 Commander's Crosses; 13,068 Gold Crosses; 65,256 Silver Crosses
- Ribbon of the Cross of Valour

Precedence
- Next (higher): Medal for Gallantry
- Next (lower): War Cross

The Cross of Valour (Greek: Αριστείον Ανδρείας, Aristeion Andreias, lit. "Gallantry/Bravery Award") is the second highest (and until 1974 the highest) military decoration of the Greek state, awarded for acts of bravery or distinguished leadership on the field of battle. It has been instituted three times, first on 13 May 1913 during the Balkan Wars but not issued until 1921 during the Greco-Turkish War of 1919–1922, then on 11 November 1940 shortly after the outbreak of the Greco-Italian War and finally in 1974.

== History ==
The award was established through Law ΓΡΣΗ/30-4-1913, as an order rather than a simple medal, but was not formally issued until the Royal Decree of 21 March 1921 (ΦΕΚ 47Α’/23-3-1921). The only exceptions to this were King Constantine I, who as head of the Order wore the Commander's Cross, and Vice Admiral Pavlos Kountouriotis, who received the Commander's Cross from the king on 15 October 1914.

As the Cross of Valour was practically defunct, for the operations in World War I, the Greek participation in the Allied Intervention in the Russian Civil War and the early stages of the Asia Minor Campaign, the 1917 War Cross (originally instituted by the Government of National Defence during the National Schism) was awarded as the senior award for gallantry and distinguished leadership. For this purpose, when the Cross of Valour was re-instituted in 1921, the Royal Decree allowed the awardees of the War Cross – which was tainted in the eyes of the royalist government by its Venizelist associations – to petition for its replacement with the new Cross of Valour, but in the event, very few chose to do so.

The award was liberally distributed during the campaigns of 1921–1922: from the first awards in July 1921 to the end of the war in August 1922, 40 Commander's Crosses (39 to regimental flags, of which six as repeat awards, and one to Lt General Anastasios Papoulas, commander-in-chief of the Army of Asia Minor), 4,528 Gold Crosses and 47,772 Silver Crosses were awarded. In some cases, after critical battles, the entire personnel of some units was decorated with the Cross of Valour. Awards continued to be made for feats performed during the Asia Minor Campaign even after its end, in 1923 and 1924, with 509 Gold Crosses (230 as repeat awards) and 3 Silver Crosses accounted for. Given the great scarcity of actual medals, however, as well as the political upheavals of the 1920s, many common soldiers – in contrast to most officers – probably never received their awards.

With the outbreak of the Greco-Italian War on 28 October 1940, the award was re-instituted by Compulsory Law 2646/11-11-1940 (ΦΕΚ Α’/13-11-1940). Until the fall of Greece to the Germans in April 1941, 240 Gold Crosses (11 of them repeat awards) and 300 Silver Crosses were awarded. The awards were continued by the collaborationist government during the Axis Occupation, with two Commander's Crosses (to the war flags of the 6th and 34th Infantry Regiments), 1,922 Gold Crosses (179 as repeat awards) and 4,635 Silver Crosses (3 as repeat awards) issued in the 1941–1944 period, most of them posthumously. The Greek government in exile awarded 96 Gold Crosses (9 as repeat awards) and 92 Silver Crosses to Greek and various Allied officers. Following Liberation in October 1944, awards continued for the operations in the Balkans and the Middle East during World War II, with six Commander's Crosses (to the battalion war flags of the 3rd Greek Mountain Brigade, the war flags of the Hellenic Army Academy and the Sacred Band and to King George II), 1,225 Gold Crosses and 1,382 Silver Crosses awarded in 1945–1946.

The Cross of Valour continued to be awarded for actions during the Greek Civil War and for the Greek participation in the Korean War, as well as for a few cases from World War II, from 1947 to 1955. During this period, eight Commander's Crosses (including, in 1947 to King Paul and General and future Prime Minister Alexandros Papagos), 4,548 Gold Crosses (including to war flags) and 11,072 Silver Crosses were awarded to Greek and Allied (mostly US) personnel.

With the abolition of the monarchy by the Greek military junta in 1973, the country's honours system was revised. In April 1974, Law Decree 376/1974 was promulgated, which regulated military awards for wartime and peacetime. It established the Medal for Gallantry, a new award exclusively for battlefield bravery, ranking above the Cross of Valour, but otherwise repeated the provisions of previous decrees relative to the latter, except that the medal was to be awarded solely for bravery on the battlefield, and no longer for leadership or military merit. The regulations as to award procedure were left to be determined by Presidential Decree. As of 2003, this had not been enacted.

== Design ==
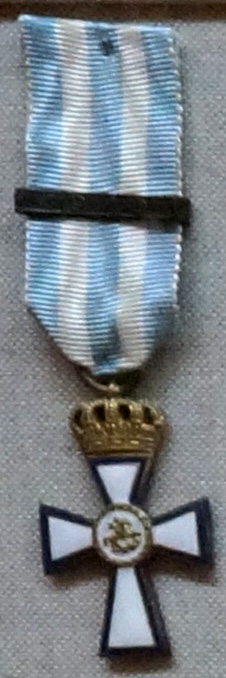
Gold Cross with the 1940 bar

The Royal Decree of 31 March 1921 instituted the Cross of Valour in three grades: Commander's Cross (Σταυρός Ταξιάρχη), worn as a badge on a necklet, and the Gold Cross (Χρυσούς Σταυρός) and Silver Cross (Αργυρός Σταυρός), worn as badges on chest ribbons. No limit was set on the number of awards in each grade. The decree specified that the Commander's Cross was to be awarded only to flag officers and war flags; the Gold Cross to senior and junior officers; and the Silver Cross to Warrant Officers, NCOs and common soldiers.

The design of the badge was specified as a "crowned cross, bearing in the middle of the obverse side, in a circle of narrow laurel leaves, the image of St. Demetrios, while on the middle of the reverse side in a similar circle it bears the words ΑΞΙᾼ ("for valour" in Greek)". The Silver Cross was to be made entirely of silver, while the Gold and Commander's crosses where enamelled in white with blue edges. The ribbon consists of five pale blue and white stripes. For each repeat award, a silver 4-millimeter star was added to the ribbon.

For World War II awards, a bar with "1940" was placed on the ribbon to distinguish it from the earlier 1913 version. Repeat awards were designated with 5-millimeter miniature silver crowns, although a maximum of three was allowed to be worn on the ribbon.

The 1974 version was not finalized until the early 2000s, when a change in design was decided: the crown was replaced by the national emblem of Greece, and the image of St. Demetrios by that of the Virgin Mary.

== Recipients of the Commander's Cross ==
Recipient	Date of award	Comments
King Constantine I	October 1914	ex officio as head of the order
Vice Adm. Pavlos Kountouriotis	15 October 1914	
2/39 Evzone Regiment	19 June 1921	
5/42 Evzone Regiment	19 June 1921	
1st Infantry Regiment	19 June 1921	
2nd Infantry Regiment	19 June 1921	
6th Infantry Regiment	19 June 1921	
7th Infantry Regiment	19 June 1921	
12th Infantry Regiment	19 June 1921	
34th Infantry Regiment	19 June 1921	
1/38 Evzone Regiment	10 November 1921	
3/40 Evzone Regiment	10 November 1921	
3rd Infantry Regiment	10 November 1921	
4th Infantry Regiment	10 November 1921	
5th Infantry Regiment	10 November 1921	
8th Infantry Regiment	10 November 1921	
11th Infantry Regiment	10 November 1921	
14th Infantry Regiment	10 November 1921	
16th Infantry Regiment	10 November 1921	
17th Infantry Regiment	10 November 1921	
22nd Infantry Regiment	10 November 1921	
23rd Infantry Regiment	10 November 1921	
25th Infantry Regiment	10 November 1921	
26th Infantry Regiment	10 November 1921	
27th Infantry Regiment	10 November 1921	
28th Infantry Regiment	10 November 1921	
30th Infantry Regiment	10 November 1921	
33rd Infantry Regiment	10 November 1921	
35th Infantry Regiment	10 November 1921	
37th Infantry Regiment	10 November 1921	
43rd Infantry Regiment	10 November 1921	
44th Infantry Regiment	10 November 1921	
45th Infantry Regiment	10 November 1921	
46th Infantry Regiment	10 November 1921	
Lt. Gen. Anastasios Papoulas	12 November 1921	
9th Infantry Regiment	3 December 1921	In exchange for the 1916–1917 War Cross 1st Class
19th Infantry Regiment	3 December 1921	In exchange for the 1916–1917 War Cross 1st Class
20th Infantry Regiment	3 December 1921	In exchange for the 1916–1917 War Cross 1st Class
21st Infantry Regiment	3 December 1921	In exchange for the 1916–1917 War Cross 1st Class
35th Infantry Regiment	10 June 1922	
41st Infantry Regiment	10 June 1922	
2nd Infantry Regiment	10 June 1922	Second award
3rd Infantry Regiment	10 June 1922	Second award
14th Infantry Regiment	10 June 1922	Second award
5/42 Evzone Regiment	10 June 1922	Second award
6th Infantry Regiment	28 May 1941	Second award, awarded by the collaborationist government
34th Infantry Regiment	28 May 1941	Second award, awarded by the collaborationist government
1st Battalion, 3rd Mountain Brigade	28 March 1945	
2nd Battalion, 3rd Mountain Brigade	28 March 1945	
3rd Battalion, 3rd Mountain Brigade	28 March 1945	
Sacred Band	25 July 1945	
Hellenic Army Academy	18 December 1945	
King George II	28 October 1946	
Gen. Alexandros Papagos	31 December 1946	
Vice Adm. Alexandros Sakellariou (retired)	1 July 1947	
Vice Adm. Epameinondas Kavvadias (retired)	1 July 1947	
Vice Adm. Petros Voulgaris (retired)	1 July 1947	
King Paul	4 August 1947	
Hellenic Naval Academy	22 February 1948	
Hellenic Air Force Academy	3 September 1948	
Lt. Gen. Konstantinos Ventiris	17 August 1951	
Greek Reinforced Battalion in Korea	21 December 1953	

== Gallery ==
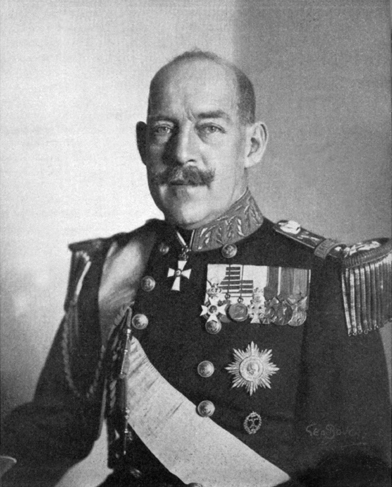
King Constantine I of Greece wearing the Commander's Cross of the Cross of Valour as Head of the Order

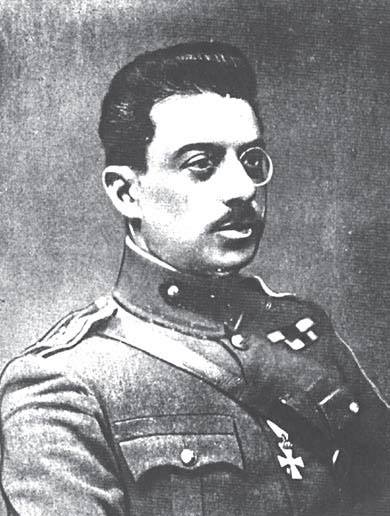
Colonel D. Ambelas, showing the usual way of wearing the Silver and Gold grades of the Cross of Valour on field uniforms, passed through the second buttonhole

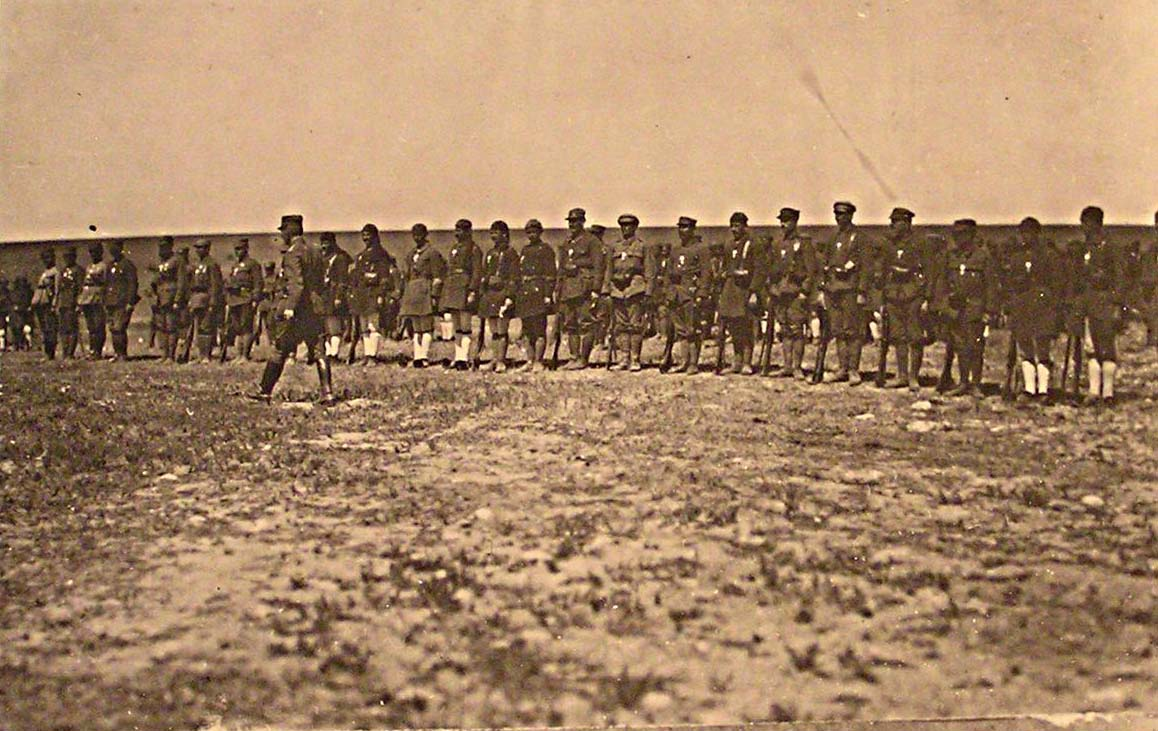
Soldiers of the 53rd Infantry Regiment after the award of the Cross of Valour during the Asia Minor Campaign

== Sources ==
- Zotiadis, Orthodoxos (July–August 2003). Αριστείο Ανδρείας (PDF). Στρατιωτική Επιθεώρηση (in Greek). General Staff of National Defense: 148–163. Archived from the original (PDF) on 2011-09-27.
- George J. Beldecos, "Hellenic Orders, Decorations and Medals", pub. Hellenic War Museum, Athens 1991, ISBN 960-85054-0-2.
