= 3rd Infantry Division (Greece) =

3rd Infantry Division III Μεραρχία Πεζικού (III ΜΠ)
- Country: Kingdom of Greece
- Branch: Hellenic Army
- Type: Infantry
- Size: Division
- Engagements: Balkan Wars: First Balkan War; Battle of Sarantaporo; Second Balkan War; World War I: Macedonian front; Battle of Dobro Pole; Greco-Turkish War (1919–1922): Battle of the Sakarya; Battle of Dumlupınar; World War II: Battle of Greece; Greco-Italian War; Greek Civil War

The 3rd Infantry Division (Greek: III Μεραρχία Πεζικού, III ΜΠ; III Merarchia Pezikou, III MP) was an infantry division of the Hellenic Army.

== History ==
The 3rd Infantry Division was established by Royal Decree on 8 September 1900 at Missolonghi, comprising the 5th Infantry Brigade at Missolonghi with 6th and 10th Infantry Regiments, and the 6th Infantry Brigade at Nafplio with 8th and 9th Infantry Regiments, plus the 3rd Cavalry Regiment, the 3rd Artillery Regiment, and the 3rd Evzone Battalion. In December 1901, the seats of the brigades changed, with 5th Brigade moving to Corfu and 6th Brigade to Kalamata. On 9 September 1904, as part of a major army reorganization, the 3rd Division's component units were fixed as: 5th Brigade at Missolonghi, comprising 6th Regiment (Missolonghi) and 10th Regiment (Corfu); 6th Brigade at Patras, comprising 9th Regiment (Kalamata) and 12th Regiment (Patras); and the 3rd and 7th Evzone Battalions (Arta), 3rd Cavalry Regiment, 3rd Field Artillery Regiment, 3rd Engineers Battalion, 3rd Train Company and 3rd Nursing Company, and the 3rd Military Music Command.

In January 1912, the brigades were abolished and divisions organized as triangular divisions. The 3rd Division remained at Missolonghi, but now comprised 6th Regiment (Missolonghi), 10th Regiment (Corfu), and 12th Regiment (Patras), plus supporting units.

=== Balkan Wars ===
At the outbreak of the First Balkan War in October 1912, the division was commanded by Major General Konstantinos Damianos. Consisting of three infantry regiments (6th, 10th and 12th), two squadrons of field artillery (1/3rd and 2/3rd), and one mountain artillery squadron (3rd), it was attached to the Army of Thessaly, commanded by Crown Prince Constantine.

During the Battle of Sarantaporo on 9 October 1912, the 3rd Infantry Division, along with the 1st and 2nd, executed a frontal attack on Ottoman forces, across open ground. The Greek divisions suffered heavy casualties due to enemy artillery in the advance, but by night had reached the Turkish lines. Ottoman forces retreated when the 4th Infantry Division attacked the western flank of the Turkish Army and captured the Porta Pass.

=== World War I ===
From 25 April 1918, the division fought in World War I on the Macedonian front, and remained active in the area around Lake Prespa until August 1920, when it was transferred to the Asia Minor Campaign.

=== Greco-Turkish War ===
In November 1920, the 3rd Infantry Division was part of the Army of Asia Minor during the Greco-Turkish War, assigned to the III Army Corps. Consisting of two infantry regiments (6th and 12th) and one light infantry regiment (2/39 Evzone), the division fought in the Battle of Sakarya and the Battle of Dumlupınar.

=== Interwar period ===
The 3rd Division was based at Patras as part of I Army Corps. By 14 October 1940 it was in the reserve of the Greek Army's three-corps defence against Italy during the Greco-Italian War.

== Sources ==
- Gedeon, Dimitrios (2001). "Ο Ελληνοϊταλικός Πόλεμος 1940–41: Οι χερσαίες επιχειρήσεις". Ο Ελληνικός Στρατός και το Έπος της Βορείου Ηπείρου [The Greco-Italian War 1940–1941: The Ground Operation] (in Greek). Athens: Periskopio. ISBN 960-86822-5-8.
- Koliopoulos, Ioannis (1978). "Εσωτερικές και εξωτερικές εξελίξεις από την 1η Μαρτίου 1935 ως την 28η Οκτωβρίου 1940; Ο Πόλεμος του 1940/1941" [Internal and External Developments from 1 March 1935 to 28 October 1940: The War of 1940–1941]. In Christopoulos, Georgios A. & Bastias, Ioannis K. (eds.). Ιστορία του Ελληνικού Έθνους, Τόμος ΙΕ΄: Νεώτερος Ελληνισμός από το 1913 έως το 1941 [History of the Greek Nation, Volume XV: Modern Hellenism from 1913 to 1941] (in Greek). Athens: Ekdotiki Athinon. pp. 358–411, 411–453. ISBN 978-960-213-111-4.
