= 2/39 Evzone Regiment =

2/39 Evzoni Regiment 2/39 Σύνταγμα Ευζώνων «ΣΧΗΣ ΚΑΡΑΧΡΗΣΤΟΣ» 2/39 ΣΕ
- Active: 1913-1941; 1950-present
- Country: Greece
- Branch: Hellenic Army
- Type: Recruit Training Centre
- Size: Regiment
- Part of: 4th Infantry Division
- Garrison/HQ: Missolonghi, Aetolia-Acarnania
- Engagements: World War I: Macedonian front; Liberation of Serbia; Greco-Turkish War (1919–1922); World War II: Greco-Italian War
- Decorations: Cross of Valour x2 Croix de Guerre

The 2/39 Evzone Regiment "Col. Karachristos" (Greek: 2/39 Σύνταγμα Ευζώνων «ΣΧΗΣ ΚΑΡΑΧΡΗΣΤΟΣ», 2/39 ΣΕ) is a historic unit of the Hellenic Army. Formerly an elite Evzone (light infantry) regiment, today its name and tradition are borne by the Recruit Training Centre of Messolonghi (ΚΕΝ Μεσολογγίου).

== History ==
The regiment was formed on 23 December 1913 at Messolonghi, as part of the Hellenic Army's reorganization following the Balkan Wars.

The regiment fought in the Macedonian front operations of World War I as part of the 3rd Infantry Division from 25 April 1918 until the war's end in the Prespa Lakes area. Following the Allied breakthrough of the German-Bulgarian front in autumn, the regiment advanced to Pirot. Along with the rest of the division, it was transferred to Smyrna in August 1920, and took part in all subsequent operations of the Asia Minor Campaign until the Greek defeat in 1922.

During the Greco-Italian War of 1940–41, the regiment was part of the 8th Infantry Division and thus one of the first units to face the Italian attack. The regiment served throughout the conflict, being disbanded after the capitulation of the Greek army to the Germans in April 1941.

After the end of World War II, on 2 December 1950 a training centre for new recruits (Κέντρο Εκπαίδευσης Νεοσυλλέκτων, ΚΕΝ) was established at Messolonghi, which on 31 August 1965 received the designation "12th Infantry Regiment", before being renamed to "2/39 Evzone Regiment" on 26 June 1978. On 26 September 2000, the regiment received the honorific name "Col. Karachristos" after its commander, Col. Vlasios Karachristos, killed in action on 20 August 1921.

For its wartime service, the regiment had been twice decorated with the highest Greek military distinction, the Commander's Cross of the Cross of Valour, the first time for its actions in the Macedonian Front, and the second for its actions during the spring and summer battles of 1921, especially the two-day battle of Avgin near Bursa in March. The regiment was also awarded the French Croix de guerre 1914–1918 for its actions on the Macedonian Front.

The regiment and the training centre are located in the "Lt. Gen. Spyros Moustaklis Camp" on the northern outskirts of Messolonghi.
