= Stefanos Gennadis =

Lieutenant General Stefanos Gennadis
- Στέφανος Γεννάδης
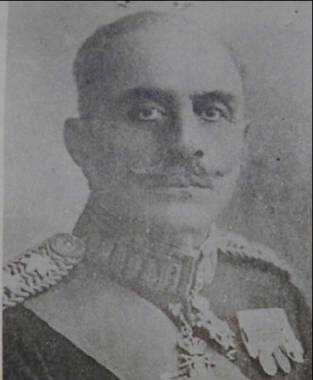
- Stefanos Gennadis in uniform
- Born: c. 1858; Chios, Vilayet of the Archipelago, Ottoman Empire (now Greece)
- Died: 1922 (aged 63–64); Athens, Kingdom of Greece
- Education: Hellenic Army Academy
- Military career
- Allegiance: Kingdom of Greece
- Branch: Hellenic Army
- Service years: 1896–1917; 1920–1922
- Rank: Lieutenant General
- Unit: Hellenic Gendarmerie
- Commands: Gennadis Detachment; 5th Infantry Division
- Conflicts: Greco-Turkish War (1897); Balkan Wars; First Balkan War; Battle of Sarantaporo; Battle of Sorovich; Second Balkan War; Battle of Kilkis–Lachanas
- Other work: Member of the Ethniki Etaireia

Stefanos Gennadis was a Greek army officer who reached the rank of lieutenant general. He is best known for his role during the Balkan Wars.

== Biography ==
Gennadis was born in about the year 1858 on the island of Chios when it was still under Ottoman rule. With the rise of nationalism in the Ottoman Empire, he joined the Greek army and the Ethniki Etaireia and proceeded to participate in the Greco-Turkish War as a captain. After the war ended in a Greek defeat, Gennadis was made the inspector of the engineering corps. When the First Balkan War broke out, Gennadis was a colonel as he commanded the Gennadis Detachment which comprised the 1st and 4th Evzone battalions. He commanded the Detachment during the Battle of Sarantaporo and at the Battle of Sorovich. Gennadis also managed to liberate Grevena from Ottoman rule. For this, Gennadis was promoted to major general on October 26, 1912, and took command of the 5th Infantry Division and proceeded to liberate the rest of Western Macedonia.

During the Second Balkan War, Gennadis lead the 5th Division at the Battle of Kilkis–Lachanas in June 1913. After the war, he remained with the Division as he was initially stationed at Drama before being transferred to Kavala along with being assigned to the IV Army Corps. Around this time, Gennadis engaged in freemasonry and was a member of the Grand Lodge of Greece. When World War I and the National Schism occurred, Gennadis supported Constantine I of Greece which caused him to be dismissed from the army and exiled to Santorini in 1917. He re-entered service after the monarchists won the November 1920 Greek elections and was made commander of the gendarmerie. He was made commander of the Old Greece Higher Military Command in 1921 and was promoted to lieutenant General but died in Athens in 1922.
