= Kleomenis Kleomenous =

Hellenic Army officer

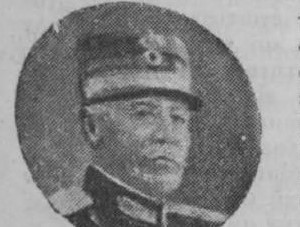
- Kleomenis Kleomenous c. 1914
- Native name: Κλεομένης Κλεομένους
- Born: c. 1852; Athens, Kingdom of Greece
- Died: 20th century
- Allegiance: Kingdom of Greece
- Branch: Hellenic Army
- Service years: ?-1914
- Rank: Major General
- Conflicts: Greco-Turkish War (1897); Balkan Wars: First Balkan War; Second Balkan War

Kleomenis Kleomenous (Greek: Κλεομένης Κλεομένους) was a Hellenic Army officer.

Born in Athens in about 1852, he fought in the Greco-Turkish War of 1897 and the Balkan Wars of 1912–13. He retired on 3 February 1914 (O.S.) with the rank of Major General.
