= 6th Infantry Regiment (Greece) =

Historic unit of the Hellenic Army

The 6th Infantry Regiment "Himarra" (Greek: 6ο Σύνταγμα Πεζικού «ΧΕΙΜΑΡΡΑ», 6ο ΣΠ) was a historic unit of the Hellenic Army.

== History ==
The regiment was formed in 1877 in Arta. It fought in the Epirus front of the Greco-Turkish War of 1897. During the First Balkan War of 1912–13 it took part in the battles of Sarantaporo, Giannitsa and the operations in western Macedonia and Northern Epirus, advancing as far as Kleisoura. The regiment also fought in the Battle of Kilkis-Lahanas and the other operations of the Second Balkan War (1913).

In 1918 it fought in the Macedonian front of World War I under French command, while in 1920 it took part in the operations in Eastern Thrace, before being transferred to the front in Asia Minor, where it remained until the Greek retreat in 1922. During the Greco-Italian War of 1940–41, the regiment captured Argyrokastro and Himarra. It was disbanded after the German invasion of Greece and the surrender of the Greek Army in April 1941.

After the end of World War II, on 16 March 1946 a training centre for new recruits (Κέντρο Εκπαίδευσης Νεοσυλλέκτων, ΚΕΝ) was established at Corinth, which on 20 September 1965 received the designation "6th Infantry Regiment". On 23 November 2000, the regiment received the honorific name "Himarra". For its wartime service, the regiment had been twice decorated with the highest Greek military distinction, the Commander's Cross of the Cross of Valour, the first time on 19 June 1921 for the Asia Minor Campaign, and the second on 28 May 1941 for the Greco-Italian War.

The regiment and the training centre were disbanded in February 2013.
