= 11th Infantry Regiment (Greece) =

11th Infantry Regiment "Argyrocastro"
- 11ο Σύνταγμα Πεζικού "Αργυρόκαστρο" (11ο ΣΠ)
- Active: 1897–1941, 1945–present
- Country: Greece
- Branch: Hellenic Army
- Type: Recruit training center
- Role: Training of new conscripts
- Size: Battalion
- Part of: 4th Infantry Division
- Garrison/HQ: Tripoli, Peloponnese
- Patron: Saint George (Άγιος Γεώργιος)
- Anniversaries: 9 March (founding commemoration); 23 April (Saint George); 24 August (Saint Cosmas of Aetolia)
- Engagements: Greco-Turkish War (1897); First Balkan War; Second Balkan War; Asia Minor Campaign; Greco-Italian War
- Decorations: Commander’s Cross of the Cross of Valour

Commanders
- Current commander: Lieutenant General Alexandros Chatzialexandris (as of January 2025)

The 11th Infantry Regiment (Greek: 11ο Σύνταγμα Πεζικού "Αργυρόκαστρο", 11ο ΣΠ) is a historic infantry regiment of the Hellenic Army. Established in March 1897, the regiment has participated in major Greek military campaigns, including the Greco-Turkish War of 1897, the Balkan Wars, the Asia Minor Campaign, and the Greco-Italian War. For its service during the Asia Minor Campaign, the regiment was awarded the Commander’s Cross of the Cross of Valour, the highest Greek military decoration for bravery.

The regiment was disbanded following the German invasion of Greece in 1941 and reconstituted in 1945 as a recruit training center. Since 1965, it has been based in Tripoli, under the command of the 4th Infantry Division.

== History ==
The 11th Infantry Regiment was established in March 1897 in Larissa as part of the 4th Brigade of the 2nd Infantry Division. Its formation coincided with the military mobilization for the Greco-Turkish War of 1897, marking the regiment's first operational deployment.

== Greco-Turkish War (1897) ==
The 11th Infantry Regiment first saw action during the Greco–Turkish War of 1897, operating in the Thessaly front as part of the Greek Army’s rapid mobilization. The regiment took part in the defensive actions around Larissa and later in the withdrawal toward Farsala, where Greek forces attempted to reorganize under difficult conditions. Its role in the conflict was primarily defensive, supporting larger divisional maneuvers as the Greek Army faced sustained Ottoman pressure. Although the campaign was short and ultimately unsuccessful for Greece, the regiment’s deployment marked its first combat experience and established its early operational identity.

== First Balkan War (1912) ==
In the First Balkan War, the 11th Infantry Regiment served under the 4th Infantry Division in the Army of Thessaly. The regiment participated in the major offensive into Ottoman-held Macedonia, taking part in the advance following the Battle of Sarantaporo. It contributed to the division’s movements toward Kozani and the subsequent operations that culminated in the capture of Thessaloniki. The regiment supported clearing actions in the surrounding areas, helping secure Greek control over the region. Its participation formed part of the broader Greek strategic objective of liberating Macedonia and expanding territorial boundaries.

== Second Balkan War (1913) ==
During the Second Balkan War, the regiment fought against Bulgarian forces in northern Greece. As part of the 4th Infantry Division, it was engaged in the Greek counteroffensive following the Bulgarian surprise attack in June 1913. The regiment took part in operations leading toward Gevgelija and Kilkis–Lachanas, contributing to the Greek victory in the region. After the defeat of Bulgarian forces in central Macedonia, the regiment advanced toward the Struma River basin, where it supported efforts to secure the newly gained territories before the signing of the Treaty of Bucharest.

== Asia Minor Campaign (1919–1922) ==
The 11th Infantry Regiment played an active role in the Asia Minor Campaign as part of the Hellenic Army’s operations in western and central Anatolia. The regiment participated in the Greek advance beyond Smyrna in 1919, moving into the Meander Valley region during the early consolidation phase of the occupation. In the subsequent offensives of 1920 and 1921, it was involved in actions along the Uşak and Afyonkarahisar sectors, supporting the wider Greek thrust toward the Sakarya River.

During the Battle of Sakarya (August–September 1921), the regiment took part in the divisional assaults aimed at securing high ground east of Polatlı, facing strong resistance from Turkish nationalist forces. Despite the eventual Greek withdrawal, the regiment maintained cohesion under difficult conditions and contributed to the orderly retreat toward Eskişehir. Its service throughout the campaign, marked by prolonged operations, extensive marches, and heavy combat, led to the award of the Commander’s Cross of the Cross of Valour to the unit, recognizing its discipline and endurance in one of the most demanding theatres of the conflict.

== Greco-Italian War (1940–1941) ==
At the outbreak of the Greco–Italian War in October 1940, the 11th Infantry Regiment was deployed to the Epirus front as part of the defensive effort against the Italian invasion. The regiment participated in the counteroffensive that pushed Italian forces back into southern Albania, taking part in operations near the Gramos and Vovousa sectors. Throughout the winter of 1940–41, it remained engaged in holding positions in mountainous terrain under harsh weather conditions. The German invasion of Greece in April 1941 forced a general retreat of Greek forces, and the regiment was formally disbanded on 2 May 1941 following the collapse of organized resistance.

== Reconstitution and modern role (1945–present) ==
The regiment was re-established in 1945 as a recruit training formation. In 1965, it was permanently stationed in Tripoli, in the Peloponnese. Since then, the regiment has focused on training new personnel for service in the Hellenic Army, continuing its lineage as an active unit within the 4th Infantry Division. It will be reduced to a battalion-strength formation.

== Battle honours ==
- Greco-Turkish War (1897)
- First Balkan War (1912–1913)
- Second Balkan War (1913)
- Asia Minor Campaign (1919–1922)
- Greco-Italian War (1940–1941)
