= Battle of Sarantaporo =

Battle fought in the First Balkan War

Coordinates: 40.04°N 22.03°E

- Part of the First Balkan War
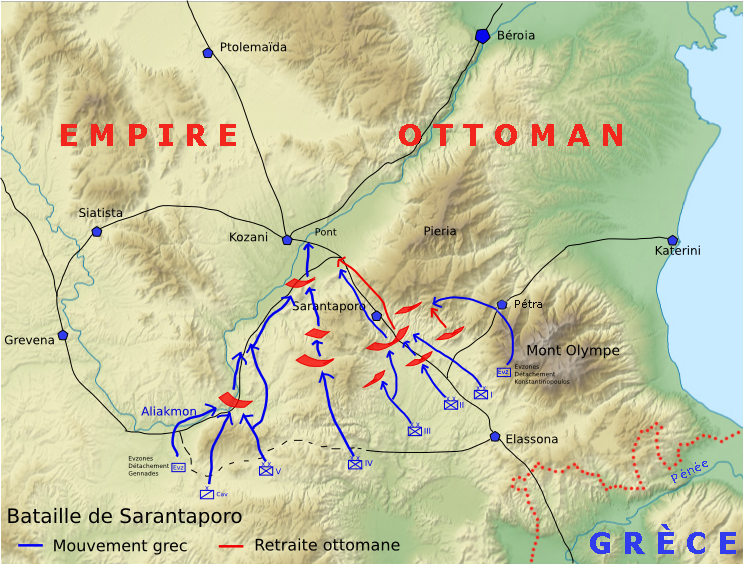
- Map of the battle.
| Date | 9–10 October 1912 (Note: All dates used in this article are Old Style which is 13 days before New Style.) |
| Location | Sarantaporo, Manastir Vilayet, Ottoman Empire (present-day Greece) |
| Result | Greek victory: Greek army captures Servia and Kozani |

Belligerents
| Greece | Ottoman Empire |

Commanders and leaders
| (Greece) Crown Prince Constantine | General Hasan Tahsin Pasha |

Units involved
| Army of Thessaly: 1st Infantry Division; 2nd Infantry Division; 3rd Infantry Division; 4th Infantry Division; 5th Infantry Division | VIII Corps: 22nd Infantry Division; Nasliç Division |

Strength
| 5 divisions | 2 divisions |

Casualties and losses
| 182 killed 1,000 wounded | 500 killed 1,000 wounded 701 prisoners of war 22–25 field artillery pieces |
- Location of the battle in present day Greece

The Battle of Sarantaporo, also variously transliterated as Sarantaporon or Sarandaporon (Greek: Μάχη του Σαρανταπόρου, Turkish: Sarandapor Muharebesi), took place on 9–10 October, 1912. It was the first major battle fought between Greek forces under Crown Prince Constantine and Ottoman forces under General Hasan Tahsin Pasha during the First Balkan War. The battle began when the Greek army attacked the Ottoman defensive line at the Sarantaporo pass, which connected Thessaly with central Macedonia.

Despite being perceived as impregnable by its defenders, the main body of the Greek forces managed to advance deep inside the pass, while auxiliary units broke through the Ottoman flanks. The Ottomans abandoned their defensive line during the night, fearing encirclement. The Greek victory at Sarantaporo opened the way for the capture of Servia and Kozani.

== Background ==
Following the conclusion of the Greek War of Independence, the Megali Idea (Great Idea) ideology came to dominate Greek foreign policy. The ultimate goal of the Megali Idea was the incorporation of all areas traditionally populated by Greeks into an independent Greek state. The disastrous Greek defeat in the short Greco-Turkish War of 1897 exposed major flaws in the Greek Army's organization, training and logistics. Upon his appointment in December 1905, Georgios Theotokis became the first postwar Greek prime minister to focus his attention on strengthening the army. He established the National Defense Fund which financed the purchase of large quantities of ammunition. In addition a new table of organization was introduced for the country's navy and army, the latter being augmented by numerous artillery batteries. Theotokis' resignation in January 1909 and the perceived neglect of the armed forces by his successor resulted in the Goudi coup seven months later. Rather than taking power for themselves, the putschists invited Cretan politician Eleftherios Venizelos to rule the country. Venizelos followed in Theotokis' footsteps by rearming and retraining the military, enacting extensive fortification and infrastructure works, purchasing new weapons, and recalling the reservists for training.

The climax of this effort was the invitation in 1911 of a British naval mission and a French military mission. The British mission was headed by Rear Admiral Lionel Grant Tufnell, who placed an emphasis on gunnery practice and fleet maneuvers, while his assistants introduced a new fuse for the Whitehead torpedo. The French mission under Brigadier General Joseph Paul Eydoux focused its attention on improving discipline and training senior officers in large formation operations. The Hellenic Military Academy was modeled after the École spéciale militaire de Saint-Cyr shifting its focus from artillery and engineer training towards that of infantry and cavalry.

After being informed of a Serbo-Bulgarian alliance, Venizelos ordered his ambassador in Sofia to prepare a Greco-Bulgarian defense agreement by 14 April 1912. This was due to fears that should Greece fail to participate in a future war against the Turks it would be unable to capture the Greek majority areas of Macedonia. The treaty was signed on 15 July 1912, with the two countries agreeing to assist each other in case of a defensive war and to safeguard the rights of Christian populations in Ottoman-held Macedonia, thus joining the loose Balkan League alliance with Serbia, Montenegro and Bulgaria. Fearing a new war in the Balkans, the Turks mobilized their armed forces on 14 September and began transferring units to Thrace; the Balkan League responded in kind. On 30 September, the League presented the Ottomans with a list of demands regarding the rights of its Christian population. The Ottoman Empire rebuffed the demands, recalled its ambassadors in Sofia, Belgrade and Athens and expelled the League's negotiators on 4 October. The Balkan League officially declared war against Ottoman Turkey, while Montenegro had already began military operations on 25 September.

== Prelude ==
Greece dispatched the Army of Epirus and the Army of Thessaly to its frontiers in Epirus and Thessaly respectively. The latter numbered 100,000 men, and was divided into seven divisions: namely the 1st, the 2nd, the 3rd, the 4th, the 5th, the 6th and the 7th Infantry Divisions, as well as a cavalry brigade and four independent Evzones battalions. The Army of Thessaly was commanded by Crown Prince Constantine. Facing the Greeks in Thessaly was the Ottoman VIII Corps under General Hasan Tahsin Pasha which included three divisions: the regular (nizamiye) 22nd Division and the reserve (redif) Nasliç and Aydın Divisions which, combined with the Ottoman garrisons in western Macedonia, totaled 35,000–40,000 men.

The Army of Thessaly crossed into Ottoman territory in the early morning hours of 5 October, finding most border posts to be abandoned, with the garrisons at Melouna Pass, Profitis Ilias and Tsouka resisting for several hours before retreating. The first major clashes took place the following day when the 1st and 2nd Greek Divisions attacked hastily organized defenses north of Elassona. Elassona was defended by three infantry battalions, two artillery batteries and half a squadron of cavalry. The battle for Elassona lasted for three hours, with the Ottomans retreating to avoid encirclement, thus giving the troops manning the main defensive line at Sarantaporo additional time to reinforce their positions. The Greeks went on to advance 20 kilometres (12 miles) into the Elassona plateau without encountering any resistance. Between 7 and 8 October, Greek troops regrouped in front of Sarantaporo and dispatched cavalry reconnaissance patrols towards the Ottoman positions, locating the headquarters of the Ottoman VIII Corps at Hania Viglas and those of a reserve division at Glikovo.

Situated between the Vigla and Amorves mountains, Sarantaporo was a narrow mountain pass, the only one connecting Thessaly with central Macedonia; it spanned some 7–8 km (4–5 miles). Having ceded Thessaly to Greece in the Convention of Constantinople (1881), the Ottomans had been methodically reinforcing their positions around Sarantaporo in anticipation of a future war. The Ottomans had organized their defenses under the guidance of German military advisors, placing their artillery batteries and infantry in sheltered, camouflaged trenches on the ravine's steep slopes, allowing them to accurately fire along its entire length. Considered to be nearly impenetrable it was dubbed "the graveyard of the Greek Army" by the Prussian Field Marshal Colmar Freiherr von der Goltz.

== Battle ==
At 7 a.m. on 9 October, the Greek infantry began its assault on Sarantaporo. The 1st, 2nd and 3rd Divisions attacked the Ottoman main line frontally, their advance hampered by accurate Ottoman rifle and artillery fire and the ruggedness of the terrain. In the meantime, the 4th Division conducted a flanking maneuver from the west with the intention of occupying the Porta Pass, and striking the rear of the Ottoman positions. The 5th Division advanced further to the west towards the village of Zampourda which was situated on the other bank of the Haliacmon River, with the intention of protecting the left flank of the Greek forces emerging from the Sarantaporo pass. The cavalry brigade moved on the extreme west along the road towards Servia, planning to block the bridge across the Haliacmon. Attacking from the east of the pass the Konstantinopoulos Evzone detachment overcame stiff resistance at Vlacholeivado and captured the village, but failed to advance further due to heavy fog. At 2 p.m., the main bulk of the Greek artillery was brought to the main line, joining the engagement. Despite suffering heavy casualties, the three divisions had halted some 500–700 metres (500–800 yd) from the Ottoman trenches intending to launch a final assault the following morning.

The 4th Division fought its way through the villages of Metaxas and Rachovo. Upon reaching the Porta Pass it engaged in a bloody clash with the defenders, securing its objective at 5 p.m. The 5th Division and the Gennadis Evzone detachment were confronted by four Ottoman reserve battalions at Lazarades which held their ground until sunset. The commander of the cavalry brigade ordered his unit to encamp at Loudani, refusing to advance further because of the resistance offered by the Ottomans at Lazarades. Fearing that they would be encircled by the Konstantinopoulos Evzone detachment, the Ottomans began to withdraw at 7 p.m., towards their second defensive line at Hani 739, under the cover of the night. Before retreating they fired a 20-minute artillery barrage on Greek positions along the entire frontline. Unaware of the Ottoman retreat the Greeks failed to use the opportunity and cut their access to the bridge across the Haliacmon. Upon reaching their second defensive line, the Ottomans became aware of the 4th Divisions' seizure of Porta Pass and panic spread in their ranks and many soldiers fled, abandoning their equipment. On the morning of 10 October, the 4th Division charged down the northern slope of the Rahovo Mountain, surprising the Ottoman infantry and artillerymen who abandoned over twenty Krupp guns and engaged in a disorganized retreat. The Greek cavalry's indecision once again enabled the fleeing Ottomans to safely reach Servia and Kozani.

== Aftermath ==
At 4 p.m. on 10 October, the 4th Division entered Servia, witnessing 75 to 90 severed human heads belonging to local Christians lined up on either side of one of its streets. Following the declaration of war local authorities had detained all the Christian dignitaries from Servia and the surrounding villages with the intention of massacring them, a plan that was thwarted by Ottoman officer Omer Bey. However, upon realizing the imminent defeat of the Ottoman troops at Sarantaporo, the town's Muslim population massacred 117 local Christians. By 11 October, the entirety of the Army of Thessaly had reached the banks of the Haliacmon, while the Greek cavalry entered Kozani unopposed, opening the way for the Greeks to advance towards the Greek majority city of Thessaloniki and assist the Serbs at Monastir. On 13 October, the Greek army transferred its general headquarters to Kozani; the following day King George I arrived in the city, ordering the army to march towards Thessaloniki and Veroia. Greek casualties in the battle of Sarantaporo numbered 182 killed and over 1,000 wounded, while the Ottomans lost approximately 500 killed, 1,000 wounded, 701 personnel taken prisoner, around 22 to 25 field artillery pieces captured and other significant material losses.

By May 1913, the numerically inferior Ottomans had suffered a series of serious defeats to the League's armies on all fronts. The League had captured most of the Ottoman Empire's European territories and was rapidly approaching Constantinople. On 30 May, the two sides signed the Treaty of London which granted the League's members all Ottoman lands west of Enos on the Aegean Sea and north of Midia on the Black Sea, as well as Crete. The fate of Albania and the Ottoman-held Aegean islands was to be determined by the Great Powers.

== Notes ==
Footnotes

Citations
