= 4th Infantry Division (Greece) =

4th Infantry Division IV Μεραρχία Πεζικού (IV ΜΠ) (ΔΙΚΕ)
- Flag and Emblem of the 4th Infantry Division
- Active: 1912–1941, 1951–today
- Country: Greece
- Branch: Hellenic Army
- Type: Training and Reserve
- Part of: Hellenic Army Supreme Military Support Command
- Garrison/HQ: Tripoli, Peloponnese
- Mottos: Freedom or Death; ΕΛΕΥΘΕΡΙΑ H ΘΑΝΑΤΟΣ
- Engagements: First Balkan War; Second Balkan War; World War I; Macedonian front; Greco-Turkish War (1919–1922); Battle of the Sakarya; Greco-Italian War

The 4th Infantry Division (Greek: IV Μεραρχία Πεζικού, IV ΜΠ, romanized: IV Merarchia Pezikou, IV MP) is a formation of the Hellenic Army. Founded in 1912 as an infantry division, it continues to exist today as a reserve and training formation, headquartered in Tripoli, Peloponnese.

== History ==
The division was established in 1912 at Nafplio, with Major General Konstantinos Moschopoulos as its first commander, and comprising the 8th, 9th and 11th Infantry Regiments. Moschopoulos commanded the division during the First Balkan War, where it fought in both the Macedonian and the Epirus fronts, as well as during the Second Balkan War against Bulgaria. After the Balkan Wars, the division (8th, 11th and 35th Regiments) returned to the Peloponnese under the newly formed II Army Corps.

The division participated in the Asia Minor Campaign, where it was almost destroyed in the Battle of Dumlupınar in August 1922, as it faced the brunt of the Turkish offensive. Reformed in Greece, it fought in the Albanian front during the Greco-Italian War and was disbanded after the German invasion of Greece in April 1941. The division was reformed after the war, and has remained at Tripoli ever since.

It was reformed in 1980 from the 94th Military Command.

== Organization ==
- Division HQ Company (ΛΣ/IV ΜΠ), at Tripoli
- 2/39 Evzone Regiment (2/39 ΣΕ), at Missolonghi
- 11th Infantry Regiment (11ο ΣΠ), at Tripolis
- Communications Training Centre (ΚΕΔΒ), at Kalamata
- Engineers Training Centre (ΚΕΜΧ), at Nafplio
- Supply and Transport Training Centre (ΚΕΕΜ), at Sparti
- Telecommunications Technicians Training School, at Pyrgos
- Engineer Corps School, at Loutraki
- Technical Corps Training Centre (ΚΕΤΧ), at Patras

=== 28 October 1940 ===
Commanded by Major-General Leonidas Stergiopoulos

- 8th Infantry Regiment
- 9th Infantry Regiment
- 11th Infantry Regiment
- Artillery Regiment IV
