= Konstantinos Koukidis =

Greek military personnel

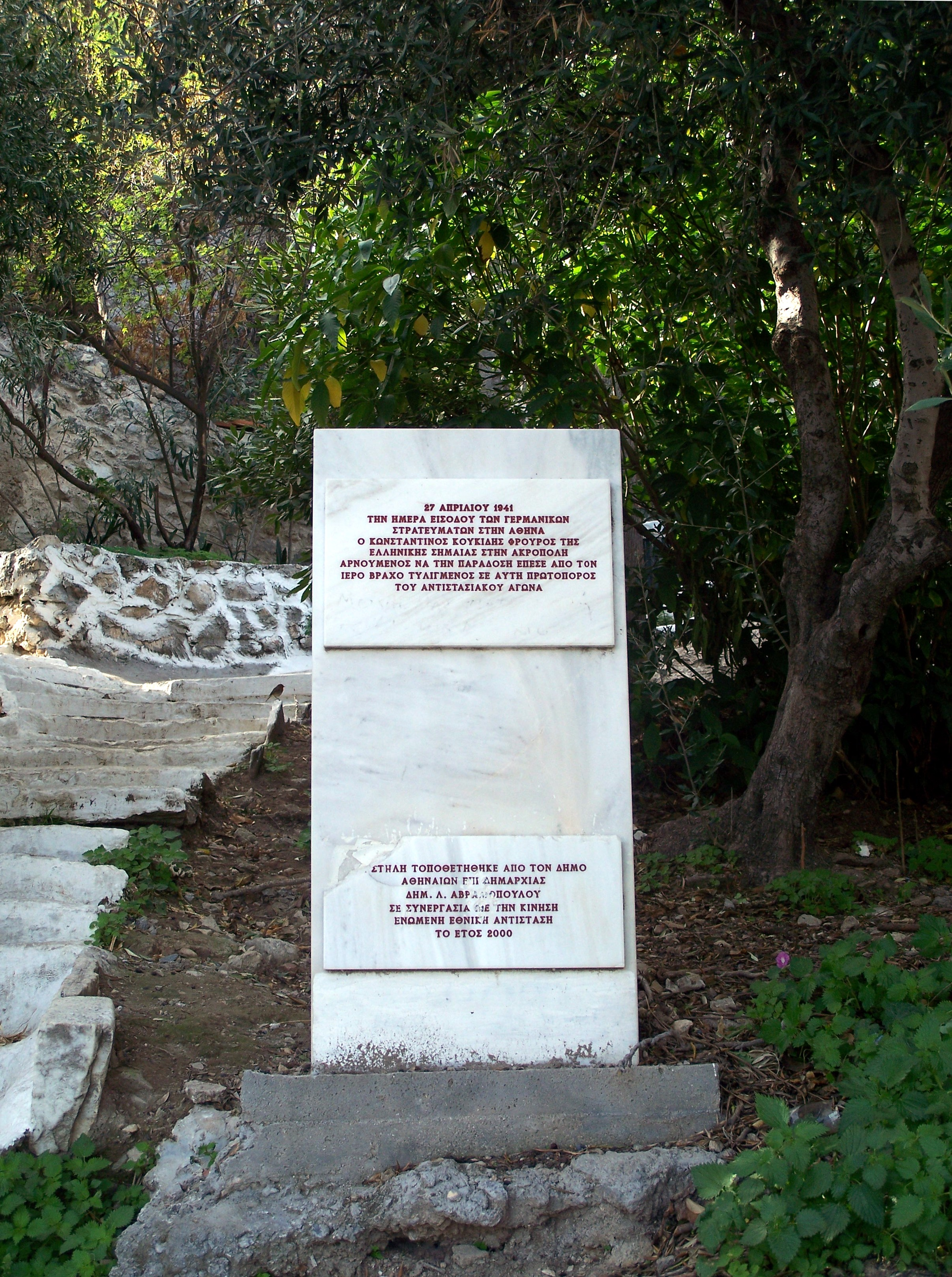
- Plaque in memory of Konstantinos Koukidis
- Born: 1922
- Died: 27 April 1941; Acropolis
- Cause of death: Suicide by jumping
- Known for: Alleged Evzone who resisted the Nazi invasion of Greece

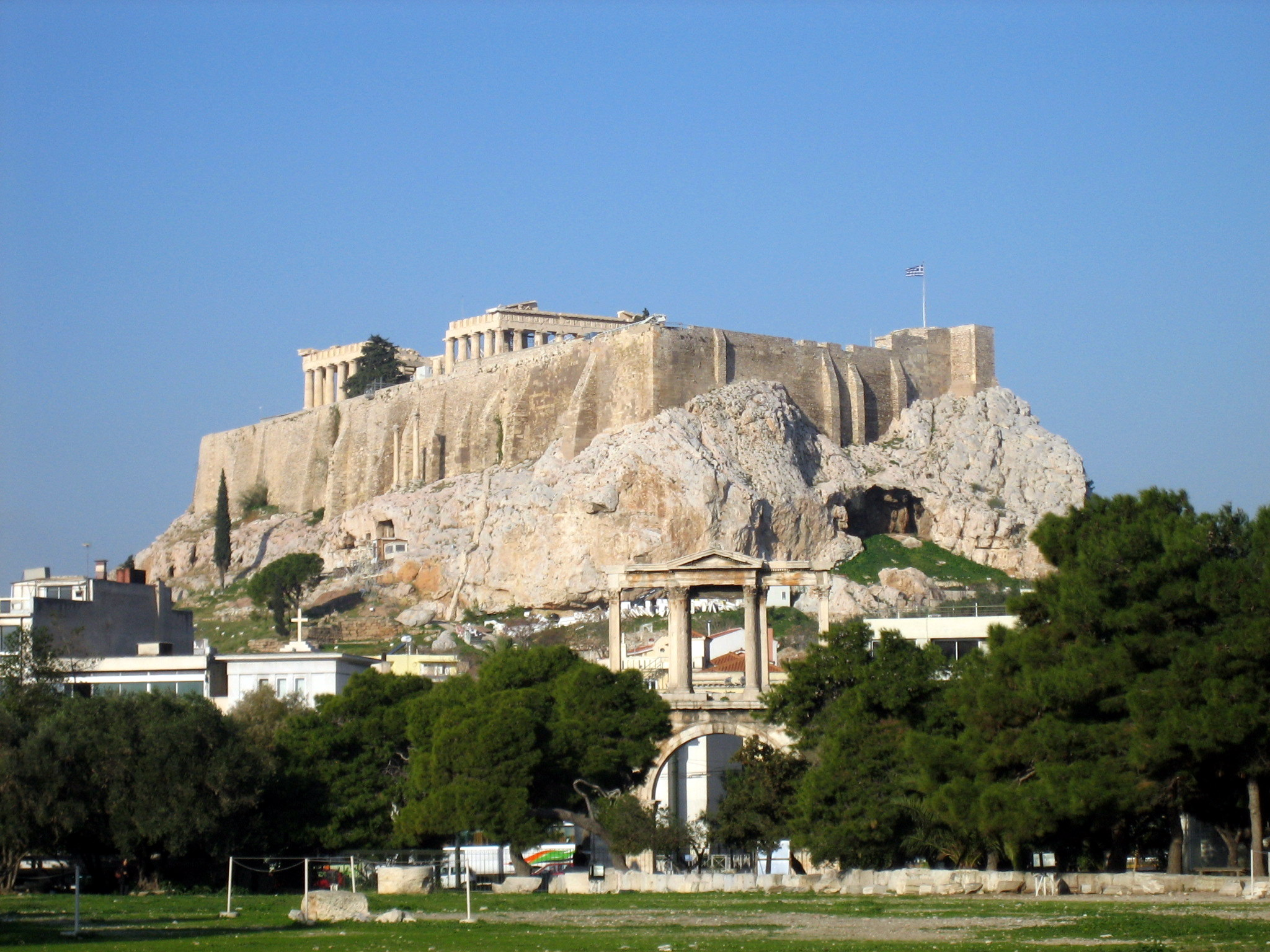
The Acropolis of Athens.

The name Konstantinos Koukidis (Greek: Κωνσταντίνος Κουκίδης) is used to refer to the alleged Greek Evzone or member of the National Youth Organisation who was on flag guard duty on 27 April 1941 at the Acropolis of Athens, the day Wehrmacht forces entered Athens and began the Axis occupation of Greece. After the first Germans climbed up the Acropolis, an officer ordered him to surrender, give up the Greek flag, and raise the Nazi swastika flag in its place. Koukidis instead supposedly chose to stay loyal to his duty by hauling down the flag, wrapping it around his body, and jumping from the Acropolis rock to his death.

The first correspondence about the event occurred on 9 May 1941, and it since has been sporadically mentioned through eye witnesses and personal memoirs of supposed friends of Koukidis, mostly every Ohi Day.

Despite that, in October 2000, then-mayor of Athens Dimitris Avramopoulos installed a commemorative plaque near the spot which the event supposedly took place, although he stated that there were no specific documentary evidence on Koukidis or his act, which modern historiography considers to be apocryphal.

== The narrative ==
According to popular narrative, Koukidis was a 17-year-old Evzone who had guard duty at the Acropolis on 27 April 1941, the day which the Wehrmacht entered Athens. According to another version, he was a member of the National Youth Organisation. Nazis ordered him to lower the Greek flag and to raise the Nazi flag. Koukidis did not obey, lowered the Greek flag and, covering himself with the flag, committed suicide from the Acropolis.

== References to the event ==
The first reference to the event took place on 9 May 1941, by the British newspaper Daily Mail. Archbishop of Athens Crysanthus also mentioned the event in his memoirs, as well as historian and SOE agent Nicholas Hammond in his published diary in 1972.

The entire story had been forgotten until 1982, when authors Kostas Chatzipateras and Maria Fafaliou mentioned Koukidis in their book Memoirs 40-41. In 1989, Greek Holocaust denier Konstantinos Plevris mentioned that the event is true and claimed that he had "the entire folder [of Koukidis and the event] from the Hellenic Army General Staff" in his possession. In 1994, a book released by Communist Party of Greece, Έπεσαν για τη ζωή (They Died for Life), mentioned the alleged sacrifice.

== Modern views ==
The head of the Hellenic Army General Staff History Department, Lt. General Ioannis Kakoudakis, in an interview for ET1 state television in 2000, and the military history magazine Πόλεμος και Ιστορία in 2001 mentioned that, after research took place in the archives of the Greek Armed Forces as well as in Greek public institutions, no evidence of Koukidis had been found.

The historian Hagen Fleischer claimed that the entire story about Koukidis traces its roots to a joke that was circulating the day the Wehrmacht entered Athens, and that the story had been publicized as a way to highlight heroes that did not become involved in internecine conflicts (i.e. Aris Velouchiotis).

== Public memory ==
The municipality of Athens, under mayor Dimitris Avramopoulos, erected in 2000 a commemorative plaque at the foot of the Acropolis, as well as in the Presidential Guard barracks. In his speech during the revelation of the monument, Avramopoulos mentioned that Koukidis is honored despite the fact that historical research does not lend credence to the actual existence of him or his supposed deed, and that the more important question is if the Greeks of today want him to exist.

== Sources ==
- Fleischer, Hagen (2006). "Authoritarian Rule in Greece (1936-1974) and Its Heritage". In Borejsza, Jerzy; Ziemer, Klaus (eds.). Totalitarian and Authoritarian Regimes in Europe: Legacies and Lessons from the Twentieth Century. New York: Bergham. ISBN 978-1571816412.
- IOS (22 October 2000). "Κωσταντίνος Κουκίδης: Ο ήρωας φάντασμα" [Kostantinos Koukidis: The Phantom Hero]. Eleftherotypia. p. 1. Archived from the original on 21 January 2022.

== See also ==
- Juan Escutia
