= Tsarouchi =

Shoe worn as part of the traditional uniform of the Greek guards known as Evzones

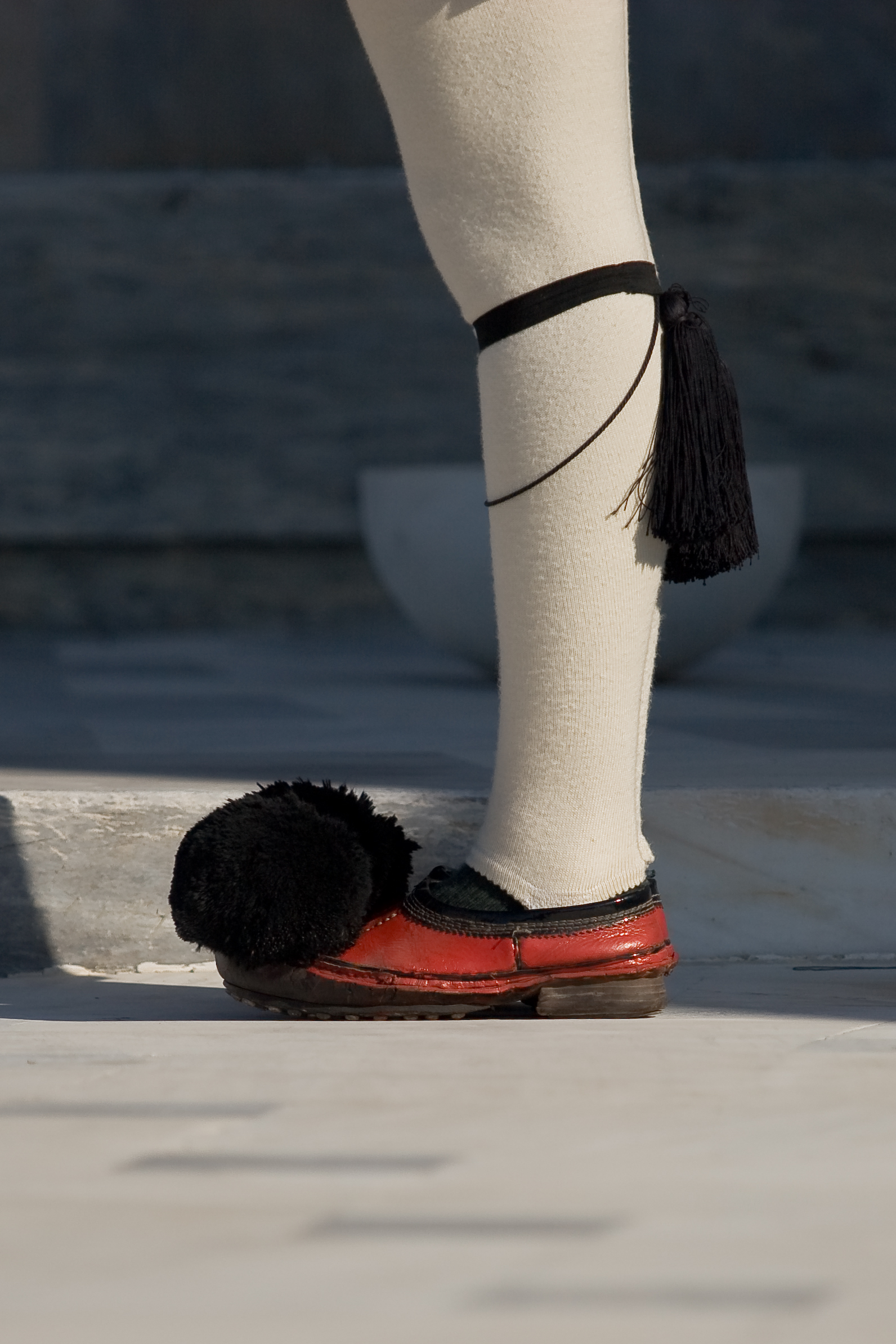
Tsarouchi shoe

A tsarouchi (Greek: τσαρούχι; plural: τσαρούχια, transliterated tsarouchia; from Turkish çarık) is a type of shoe, which is typically known nowadays as part of the traditional uniform worn by the Evzones of the Greek Presidential Guard.

== Description ==
Their origin is obscure and goes back to the Byzantine time, with influences from styles imported by neighbouring tribes, including the Turks. Originally, various types of similar shoes were worn all over the Balkans, but tsarouchia are mainly associated with the Greeks. They were the most common footwear worn by both urban and rural Greeks, mainly men, but also many women. After the Greek independence in early 19th century, their use was limited to isolated rural areas and nomadic populations, seen by westernised urbanites as a sign of uncouthness and backwardness. In a version with reinforced sole, they remained the issue boot for the Evzone units well into the 20th century, though after the First World War were gradually replaced in active service by the standard laced boot. Tsarouciia provide a clear link with the origin of the Evzone uniform in the traditional Greek costume, and with the fact that Evzones were largely enlisted from rural mountainous regions of Greece. Nowadays they are almost exclusively used by the presidential guard and in various traditional festivals and dances along with other traditional Greek garments.

Tsarouchia are typically made of a number of pieces of stiff leather hand-sewn together, in the moccasin fashion. They have a characteristic upturned toe, usually covered by a large woolen pompon, which often occurs in Turkey as well. The latter was a relatively late addition, originally a way of making the shoe's toe waterproof, but increasingly becoming an essential feature of their decoration. Simpler versions also exist, made from one piece of leather held in shape with thongs (a very common type found everywhere in the Balkans and Anatolia, e.g., Opanak or Charvuli) and without any decoration.

Tsarouchis (Τσαρούχης) is also a Greek surname, with Yannis Tsarouchis being the most famous person bearing it.

Aromanians from Balkans have a similar word for shoes, "tsâruhi". Countryside tsâruhi were made out of leather piece.

== See also ==
- List of shoe styles
