= Tomb of the Unknown Soldier (Athens) =

Symbolic tomb memorializing unidentified fallen Greek soldiers

- Μνημείο του Αγνώστου Στρατιώτη
- Greece
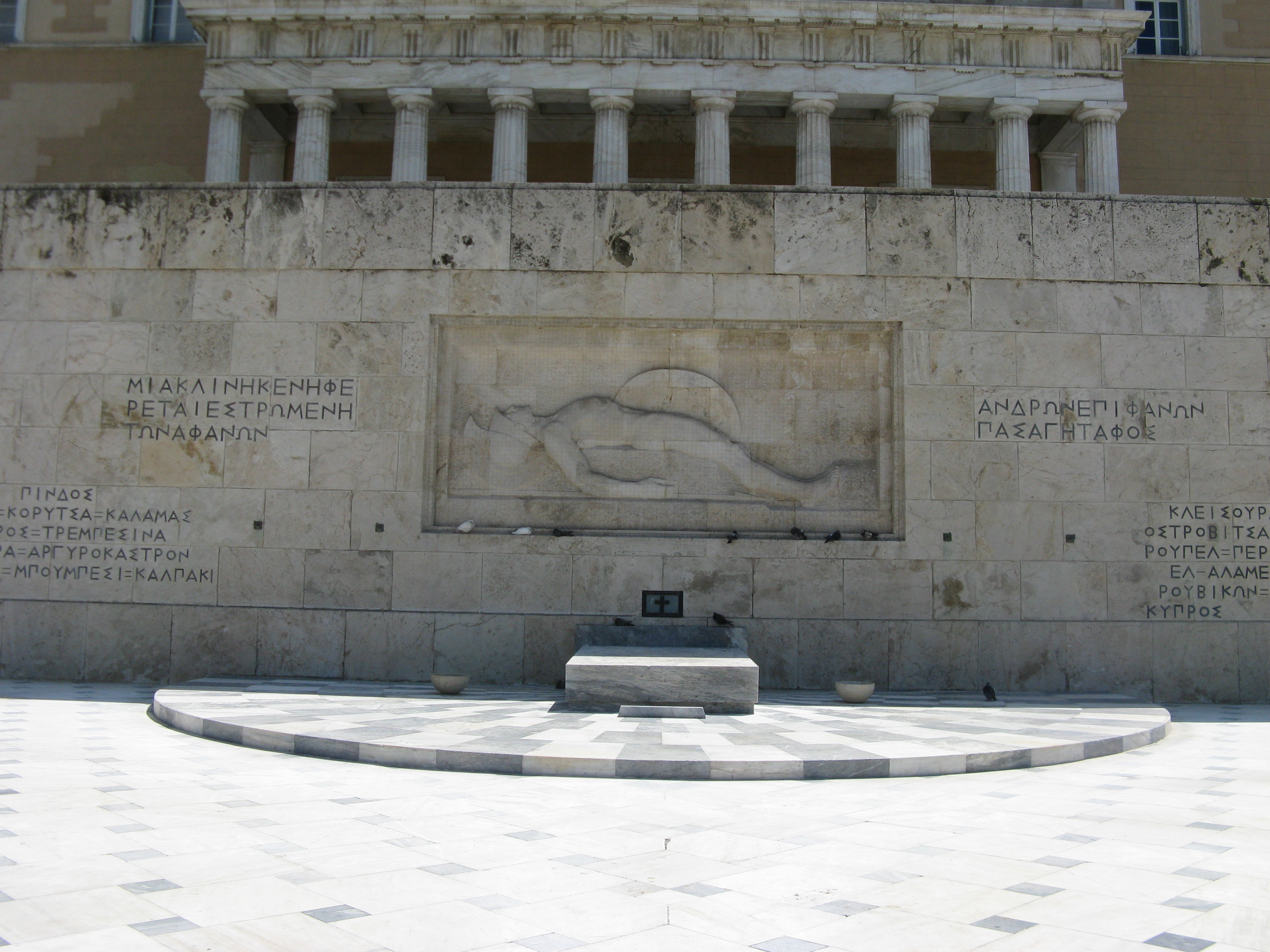
- The Tomb in Athens
- For Greeks who died in war
- Unveiled: March 25, 1932
- Location: 37°58′31″N 23°44′11″E; Syntagma Square, Athens
- Designed by: Emmanuel Lazaridis

The Tomb of the Unknown Soldier (Greek: Μνημείο του Αγνώστου Στρατιώτη, romanized: Mnimío tou Agnóstou Stratióti) is a war memorial located in Syntagma Square in Athens, in front of the Old Royal Palace. It is a cenotaph dedicated to the Greek soldiers killed during war. It was sculpted between 1930 and 1932 by sculptor Fokion Rok.

The tomb is guarded by the Evzones of the Presidential Guard.

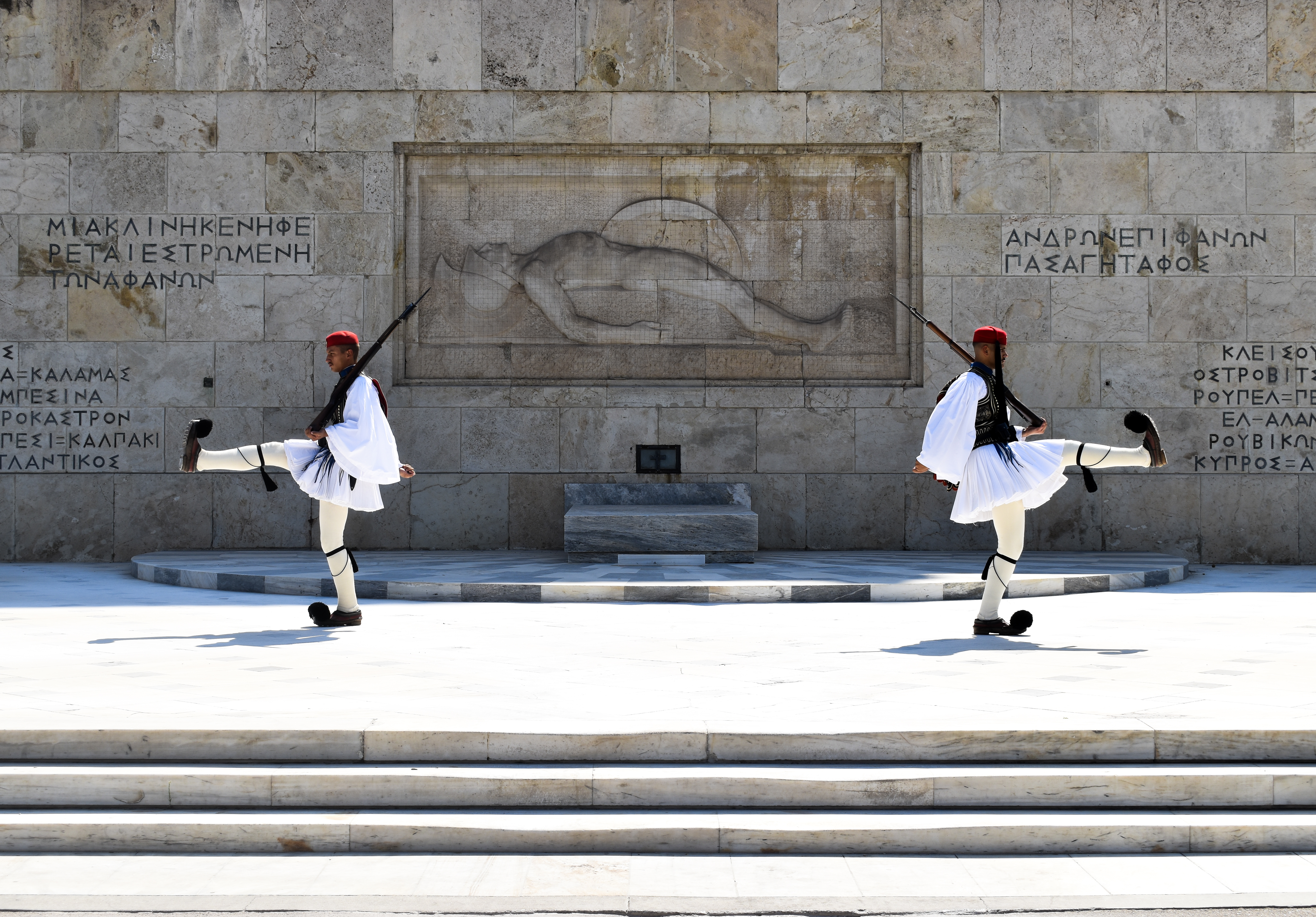
Two evzones of the Presidential Guard guarding the tomb in 2024

== Construction ==
The decision to build a monument was taken by army general and “constitutional dictator” Theodoros Pangalos. In his capacity as Army Minister, an advertisement was placed in the Espera newspaper, requesting a "submission for a study of the construction of a tomb of the Unknown Soldier, in front of the Old Royal Palace, suitable for this purpose". On 9 October 1926, the Army Ministry approved and granted by majority the study made by architect Emmanuel Lazaridis.

The location of the monument at the Old Palace was suggested both by the architect himself and by Pangalos, who wished for the Army Ministry to be housed in the building. However in 1929, after fervent reaction and continuous meetings, Eleftherios Venizelos, setting aside his disagreements with Pangalos, decided that the best location would be the original one in Syntagma Square, reasoning that the Monument ought to be in the city centre, much like the Arc de Triomphe in Paris.

The construction committee had given all responsibility for the construction to Lazaridis. Initially, he had worked with sculptor Thomas Thomopoulos who had proposed as a central sculpture a representation of the Gigantomachy with an angel (representing Greece) lovingly receiving the dead soldier. Despite Lazaridis initially agreeing to this design, Thomopoulos's sculpture was never built due to lack of funds.

In 1930, Lazaridis instead assigned Fokion Rok as sculptor with a unanimous decision of the construction committee. The committee then approved a new proposal for the sculpture, a gunner lying on the ground. This design was deemed appropriate owing to its calmness and simplicity.

For the construction, a large-scale excavation and levelling of terrain took place.

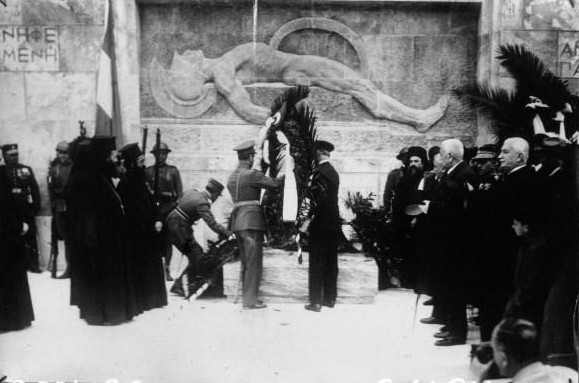
Inauguration in 1932, with the presence of Turkish delegation

The Tomb was unveiled on 25 March 1932 by then Prime Minister Andreas Michalakopoulos, with the participation of many foreign delegations, followed by a parade of the monument guard. At the same time, a torch was brought from the monastery of Agia Lavra to light the eternal flame in the centre of the cenotaph.

== Style and inscriptions ==
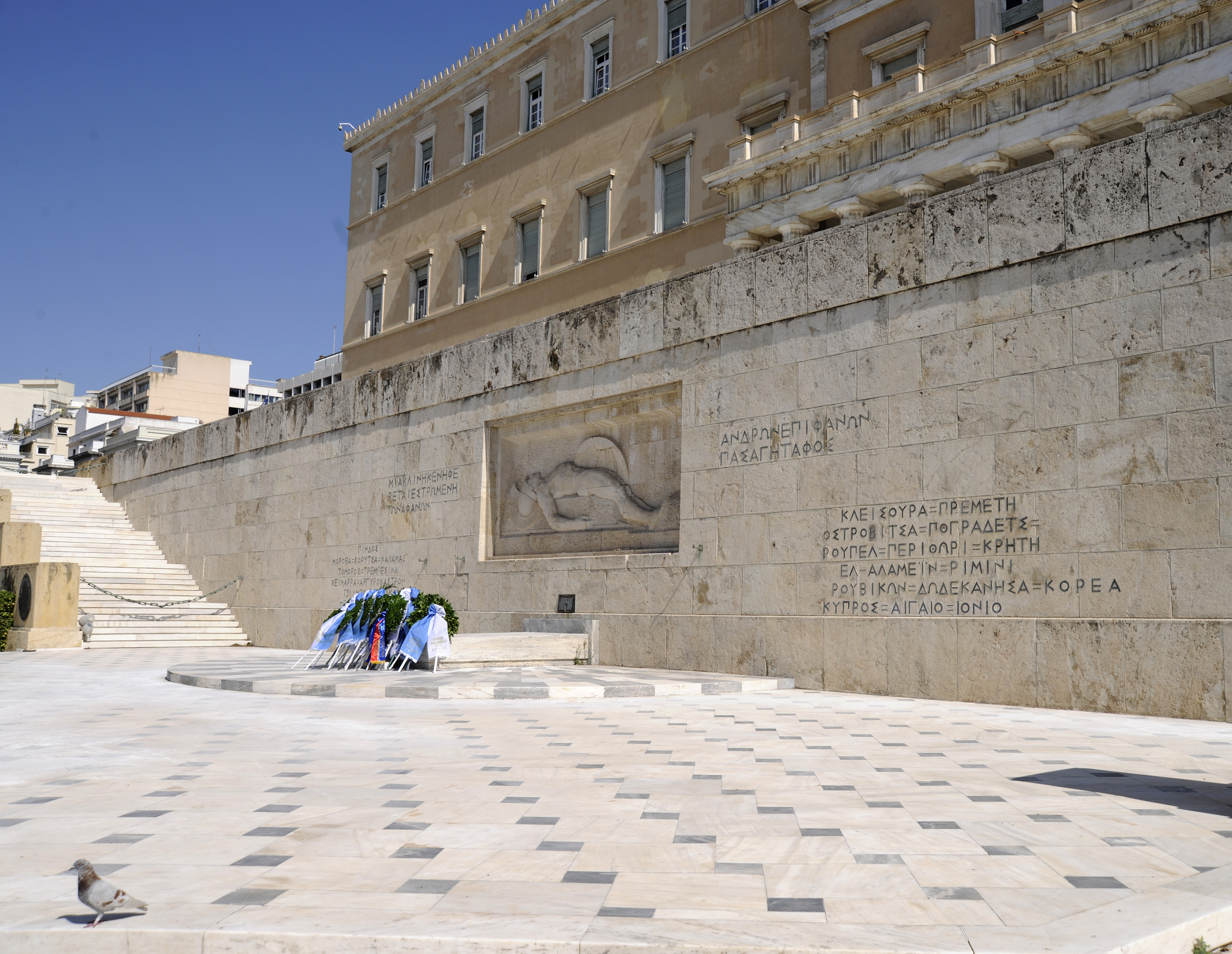
General view

The Tomb is in the French urban and classical tradition, combined with the modern spirit of Art Deco and with symbolic references to Ancient Greece. The main issue was the integration of the Tomb with Syntagma Square and with the neoclassical Palace and the contribution to the redevelopment of the square.

The Tomb is a large-scale Π-shaped retaining wall of limestone. The sculpture is at the centre of the wall. To the left and to the right there are two side staircases while in the centre there is a rectangular raised grave. The stairs of the monuments are purely decorative, as the steps are for observation during ceremonies.

The sculpture represents the naked male figure of a dead warrior lying on the ground. He holds a circular shield in his left hand and wears an Ancient Greek-style helmet. The representation of the body gives the impression that the Unknown Soldier is ready to arise at any moment.

To the left and right of the sculpture are phrases from the works of Thucydides. To the left, "ΜΙΑ ΚΛΙΝΗ ΚΕΝΗ ΦΕΡΕΤΑΙ ΕΣΤΡΩΜΕΝΗ ΤΩΝ ΑΦΑΝΩΝ" ("There's one empty bier made up for the unidentified [fallen] ones"); to the right, "ΑΝΔΡΩΝ ΕΠΙΦΑΝΩΝ ΠΑΣΑ ΓΗ ΤΑΦΟΣ" ("The whole earth is the sepulchre of famous men"). Both are quotes from History of the Peloponnesian War. Over the main sculpture in smaller writing, one reads "ΕΙΣ ΑΦΑΝΗ ΣΤΡΑΤΙΩΤΗ" ("To an unknown soldier").

The names of battles where many Greek people died in recent history are written into the limestone walls around the sculpture.

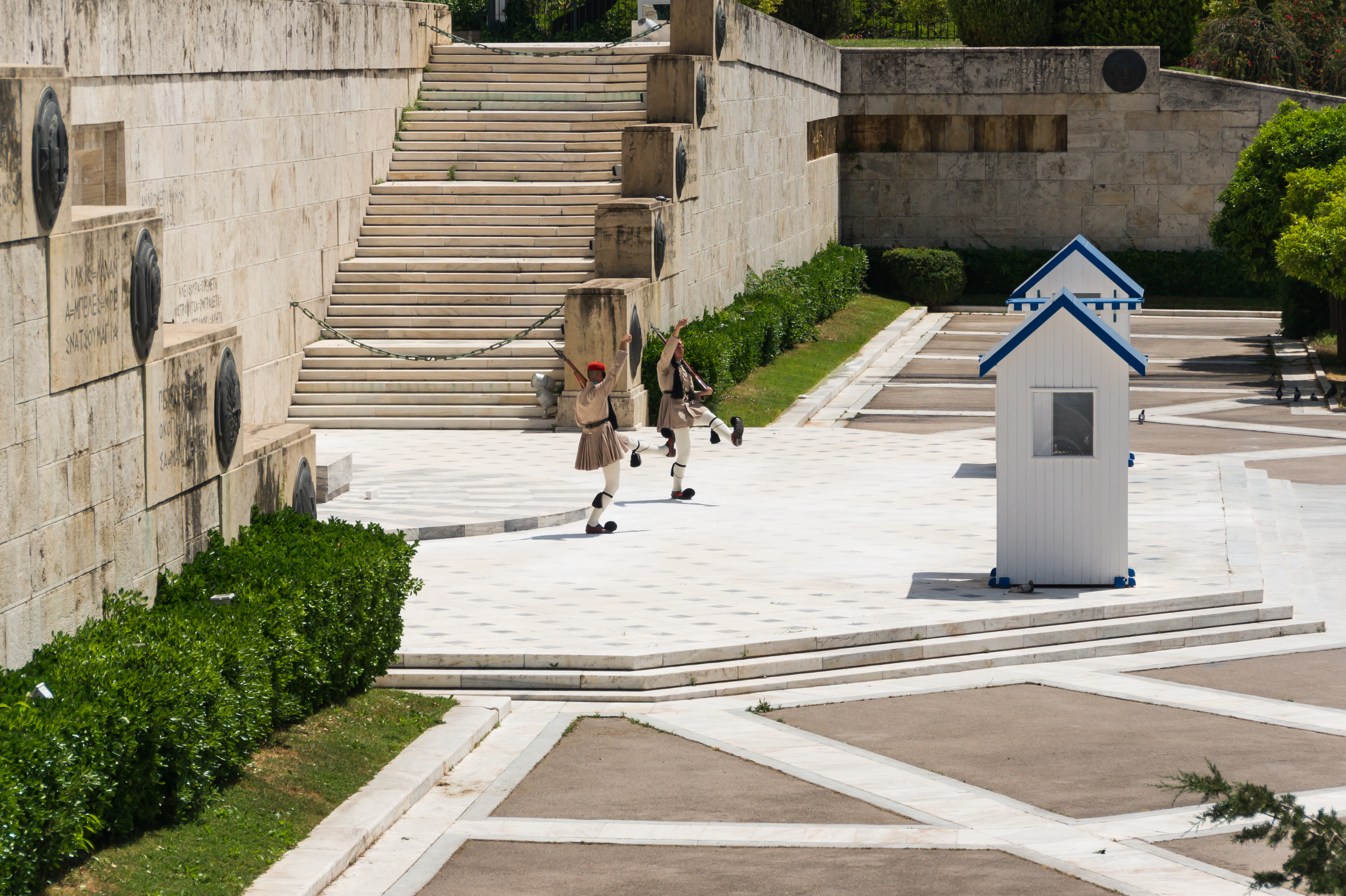
Side view, showing the steps with inscribed locations

To the left of the monument, descending by the steps, are inscribed the names of battle locations of the First and Second Balkan War and World War I: Elassona, Sarantaporo, Lazarades, Porta Pass, Katerini, Sorovich, Yenidje, Thessaloniki, Ostrovon and Korytsa, Pesta, Gribovo, Pente Pigadia, Preveza, Aetorrachi, Manoliassa, Bizani, Driskos, Kilkis–Lachanas, Belles, Kresna-Tsoumagia, Petsovo, Nevrokopi, Banitsa, Machomea, Golobilo, Sborsko, Preslap, Erigon, Ravine, Monastiri, Skra, Strymon, Doiran, Belles, Grankorone and Tzena.

To the right of the monument, descending by the steps, are inscribed the names of battle locations of the Russian Civil War in Ukraine and Greco-Turkish War: Cherson, Sermikas, Odissos, Sevastoupolis, Artaki, Aidinio, Proussa, Philadelphia, Toumlou Bunar, Koutacheia, Dorilaion, Afyonkarahisar, Sangarios and Kale-Groto.

To the left and right of the figure of the dead soldier are the names of battle locations of World War II and later engagements in which Greeks died: Pindus, Morova, Korytsa, Kalamas, Tomoros, Trebeshina, Cheimarra, Argyrokastron, (Hill) 731, Boubesi, Kalpaki, Kleisoura, Premeti, Ostrovitsa, Pogradec, Roupel, Perithori, Crete, El Alamein, Rimini, Roubikonas, Dodecanese, Korea, Cyprus, Aegean and Ionion.

== Gallery ==
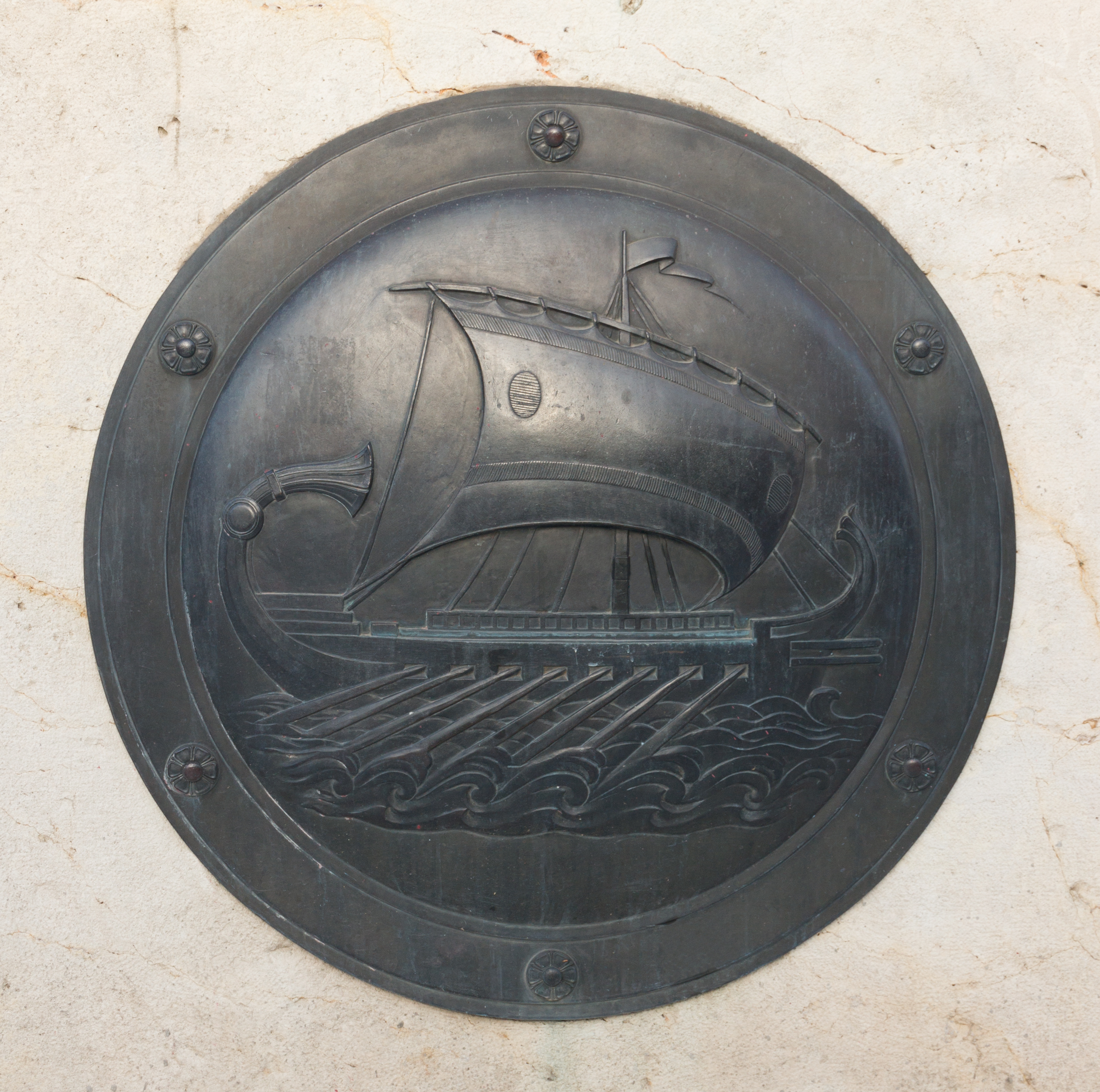
Decorative shield

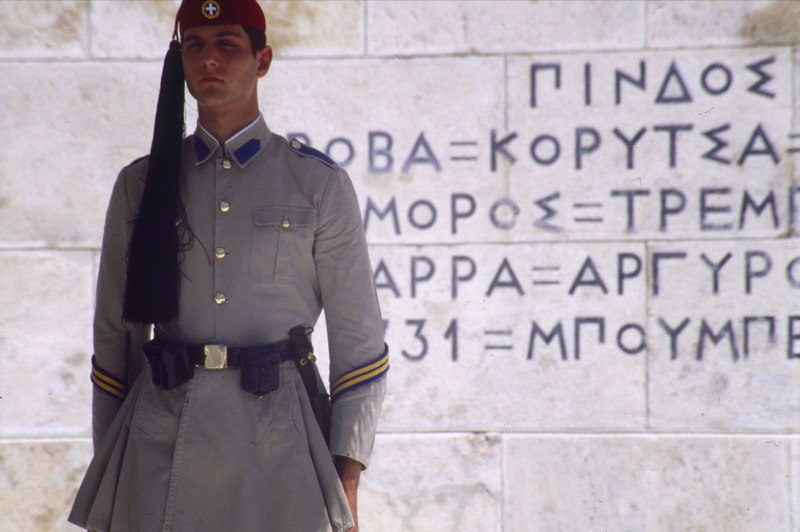
Battle locations are inscribed on the monument

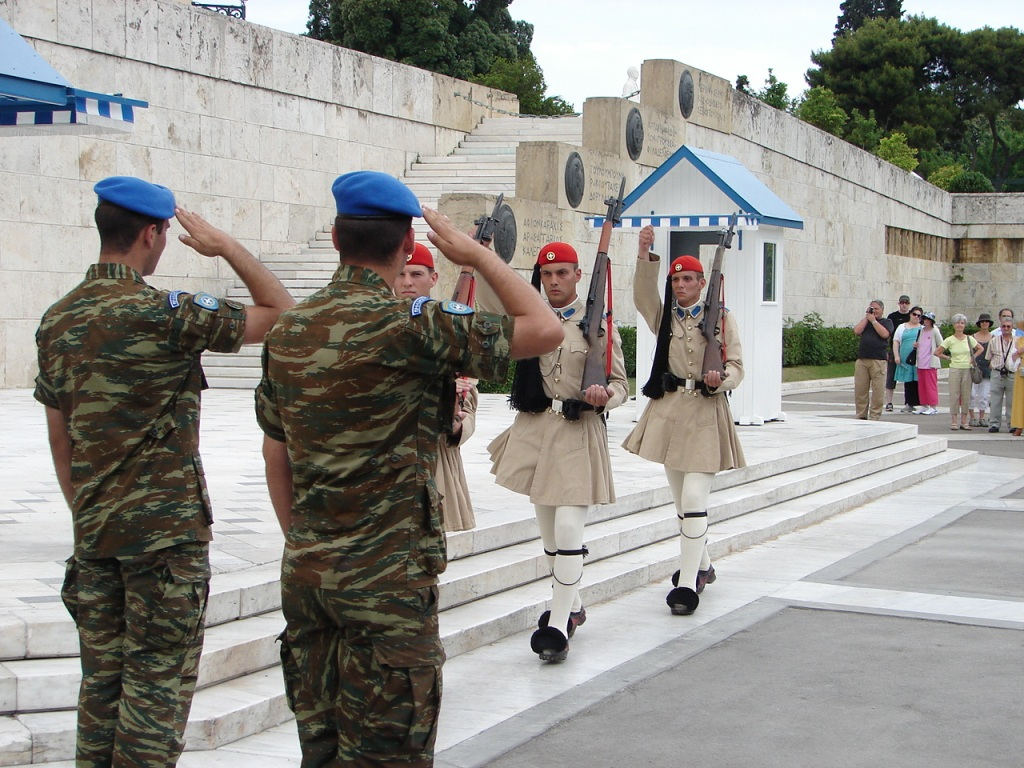
Changing of the guard

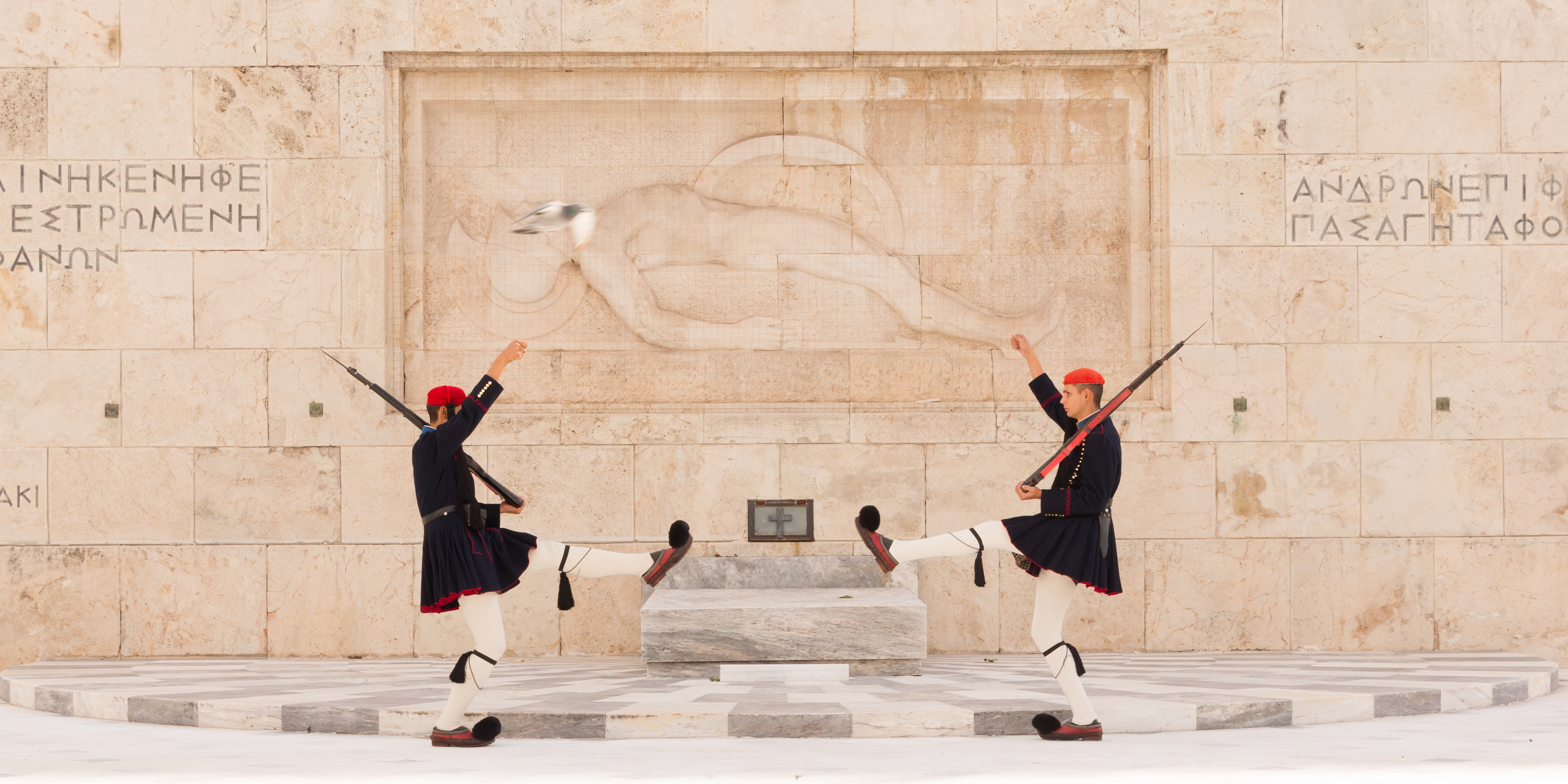
Changing guard
