= Evzones =

Unit type of the Hellenic Army

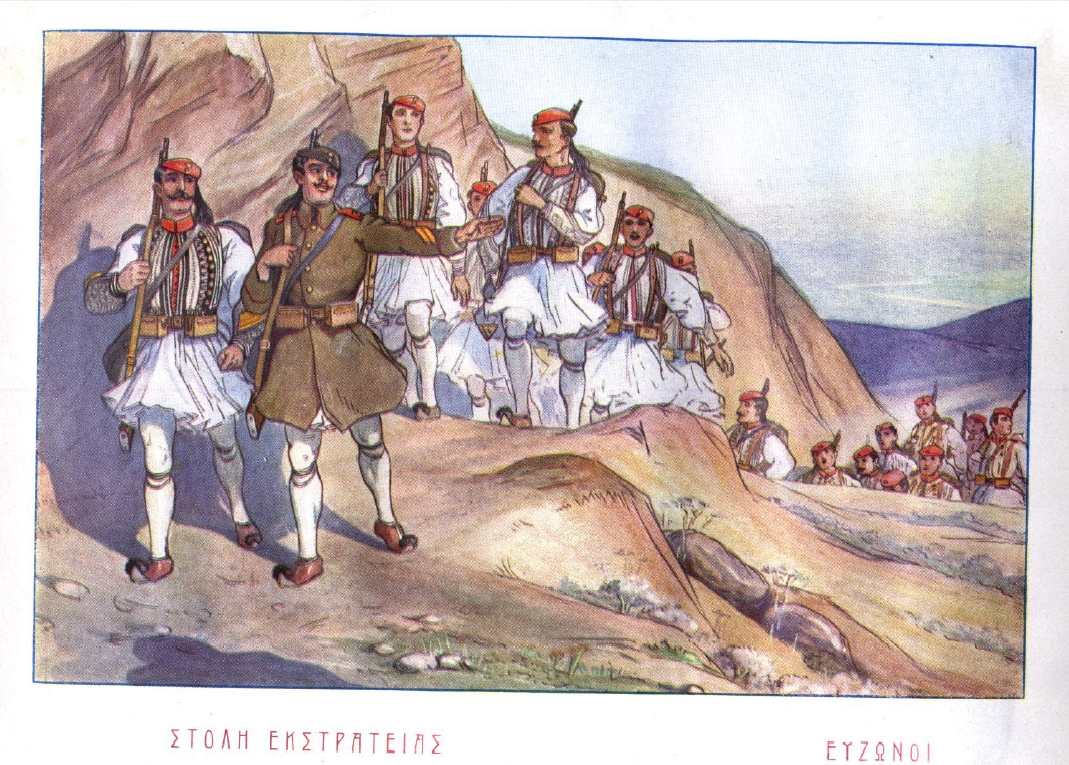
Evzones of the Hellenic Army, c. 1900

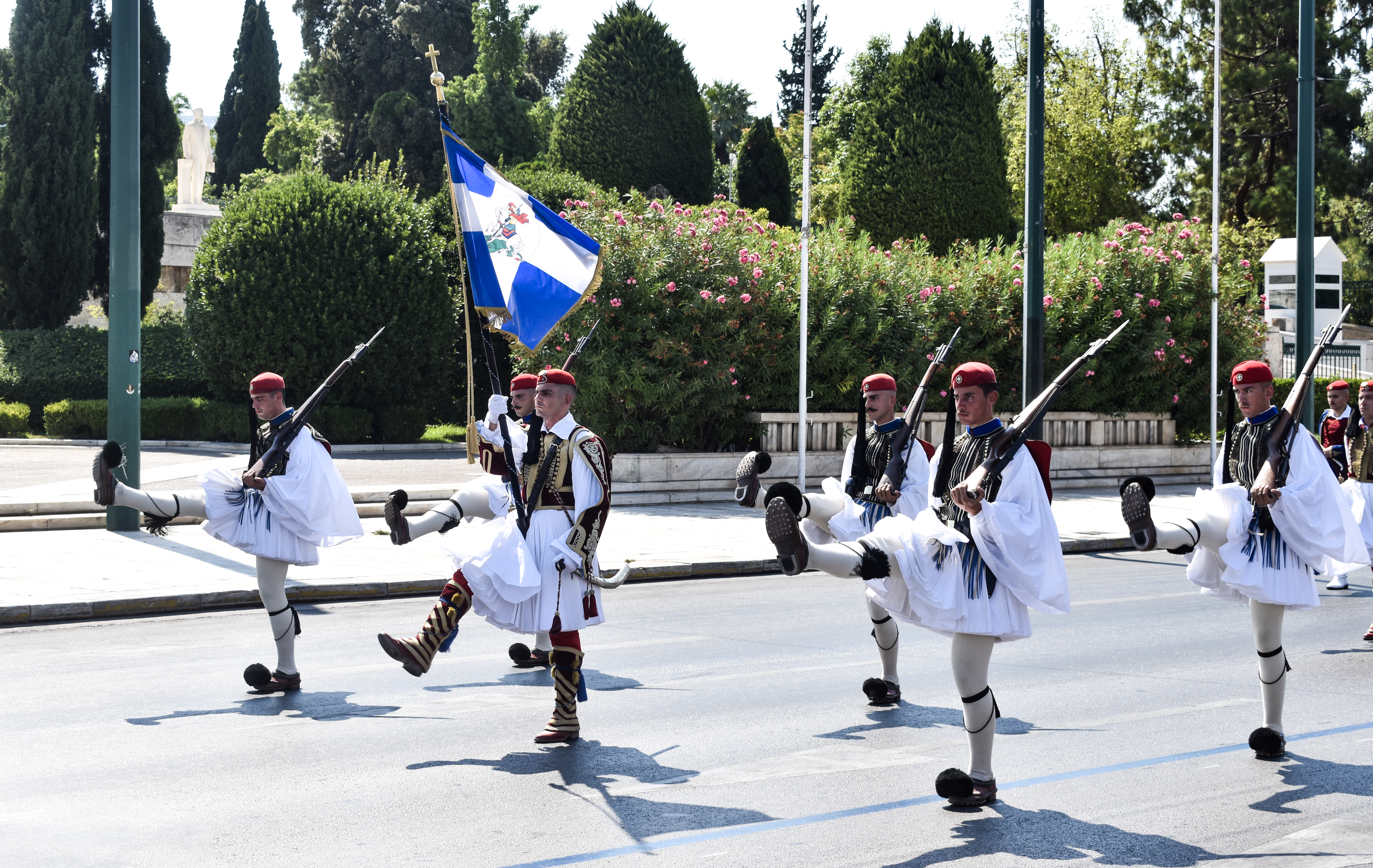
The Presidential Guard during the Grand Change of the Guard at Syntagma Square, 2024

The Evzones or Evzonoi (Greek: Εύζωνες, Εύζωνοι, pronounced [ˈevzones, ˈevzoni]) were a type of light infantry units in the Hellenic Army. Today, they are the members of the Presidential Guard (Greek: Προεδρική Φρουρά, romanized: Proedrikí Frourá), a ceremonial unit that guards the Greek Tomb of the Unknown Soldier (Greek: Μνημείο του Άγνωστου Στρατιώτη, romanized: Mnimeío tou Agnostou Stratioti) and the Presidential Mansion in Athens. An Evzone (Greek: Εύζωνας) is also known, colloquially, as a Tsoliás (Greek: Τσολιάς; pl. Τσολιάδες, Tsoliádes). Evzones are known for their distinctive uniform, which evolved from the clothes worn by the klephts who fought the Ottoman occupation of Greece. The most visible item of this uniform is the fustanella, a kilt-like garment. Their distinctive dress turned them into a popular image for the Greek soldier, especially among foreigners.

== Etymology ==
The word evzōnos (Greek: εὔζωνος) is first attested in Homer's Iliad and derives from εὖ and ζώνη, meaning "well-girt". The word was used by ancient writers for centuries to describe light infantry (better known as psiloi or gymnitai).

== History ==
=== Light infantry in the early regular army ===
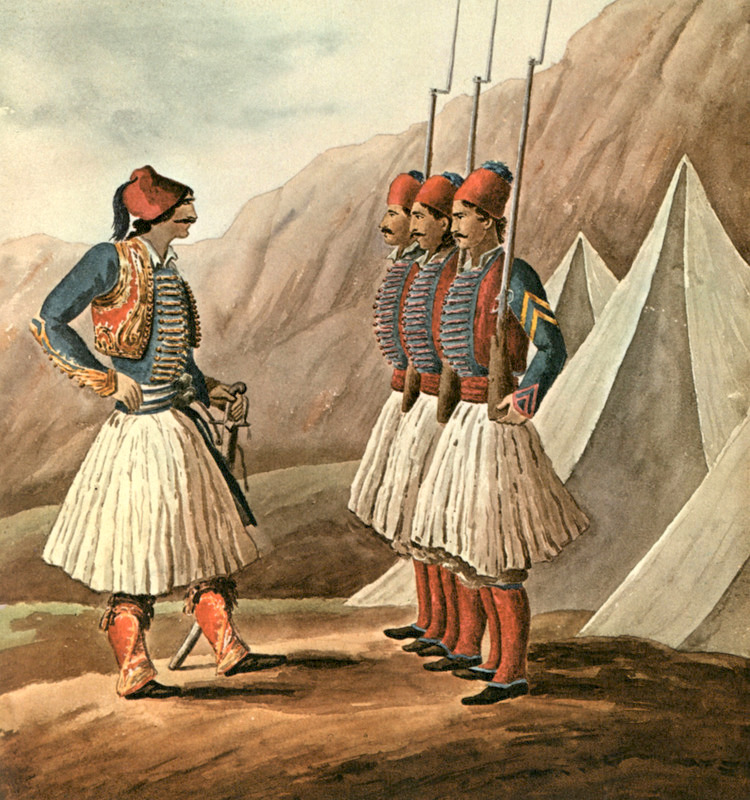
Men of the light infantry battalions established by Governor Ioannis Kapodistrias

The term "Evzones" was revived in modern practice as a Greek version of the European-style light infantry (such as the German Jäger, French Chasseurs, or British Riflemen) in 1824 during the Greek War of Independence, when the first attempts to form a regular, European-style army were undertaken by the Greek rebels. The first regular infantry battalion comprised six companies, one of which was designated as an "Evzone Company" (Λόχος Εὐζώνων).

The uniform now associated with the Evzones was not used at the time; but a uniform derived from the traditional costume of the fustanella, had already been adopted by the British-sponsored Greek Light Infantry Regiments raised during the Napoleonic Wars. A similar uniform was adopted when Governor Ioannis Kapodistrias reformed the nascent Hellenic Army in 1828 and formed the so-called "Light Battalions" (Ἐλαφρὰ Τάγματα)—five from Western Continental Greece and eight from Eastern Continental Greece—in an attempt to instill discipline and gradually regularize the irregular groups ("klephts") that had provided the bulk of the Greek forces during the War of Independence. The men of these battalions wore the traditional costume, although they were not designated as Evzones. Following the assassination of Kapodistrias in 1831 and the ensuing political infighting, the Light Battalions effectively disbanded, and their men became armed brigands under the command of the chieftains of the old irregular groups.

=== Reign of King Otto: light infantry and Mountain Guard ===
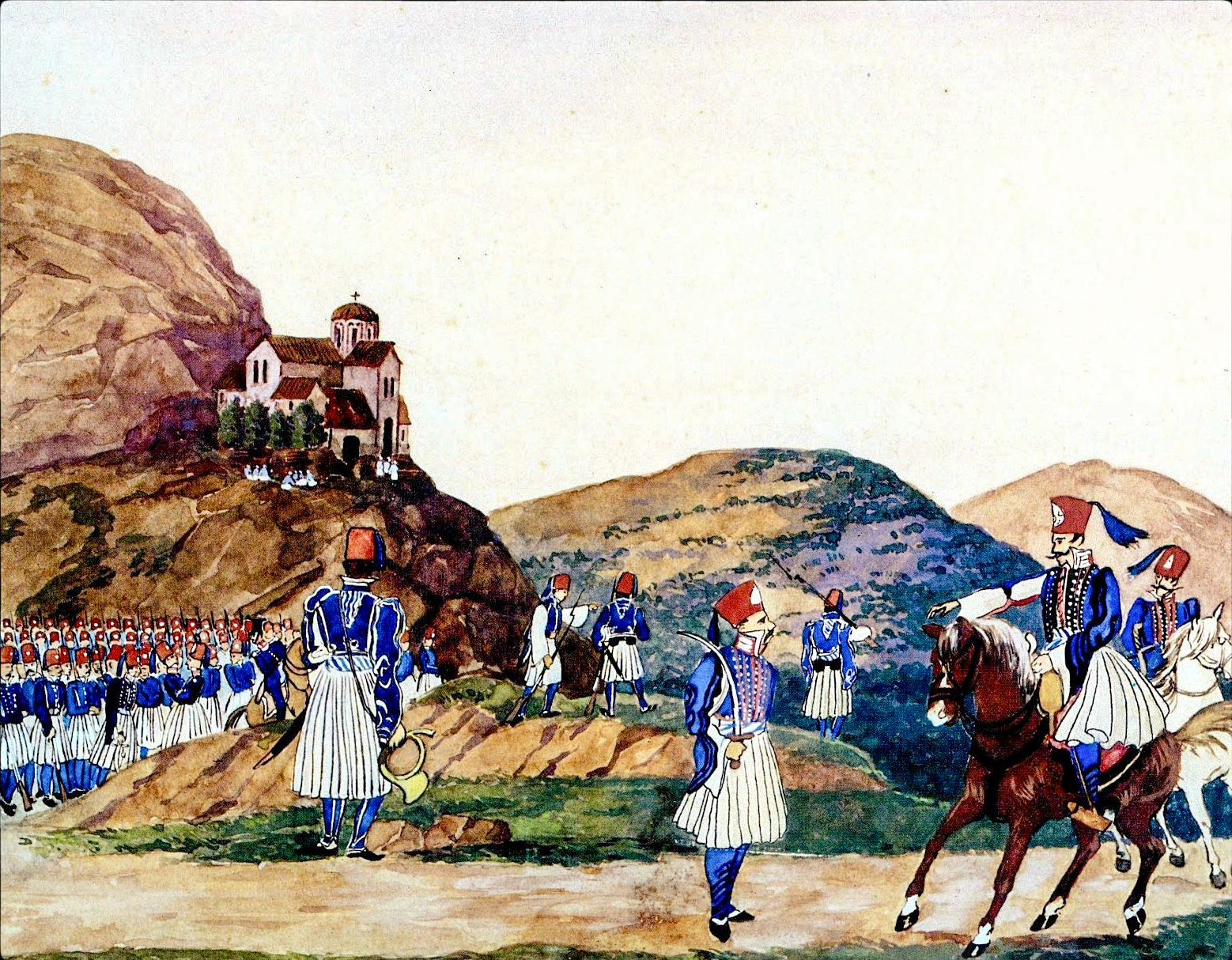
Rumeliote light infantry in 1838

In 1833, after the arrival of King Otto (r. 1832–1862) to Greece, the Hellenic Army was organized along new lines by the Bavarian officials who had come with Otto. In February 1833, the infantry was organized into eight regular infantry battalions, of 728 men and six companies each: one of grenadiers, four line infantry companies, and one light infantry company. The latter received the name "Evzones" ("Voltigeurs" in the Bavarian terminology), but their uniform was of European style, identical to the rest of the infantry, apart from the use of green as their distinctive colour in the piping, epaulettes and decoration of their uniforms.

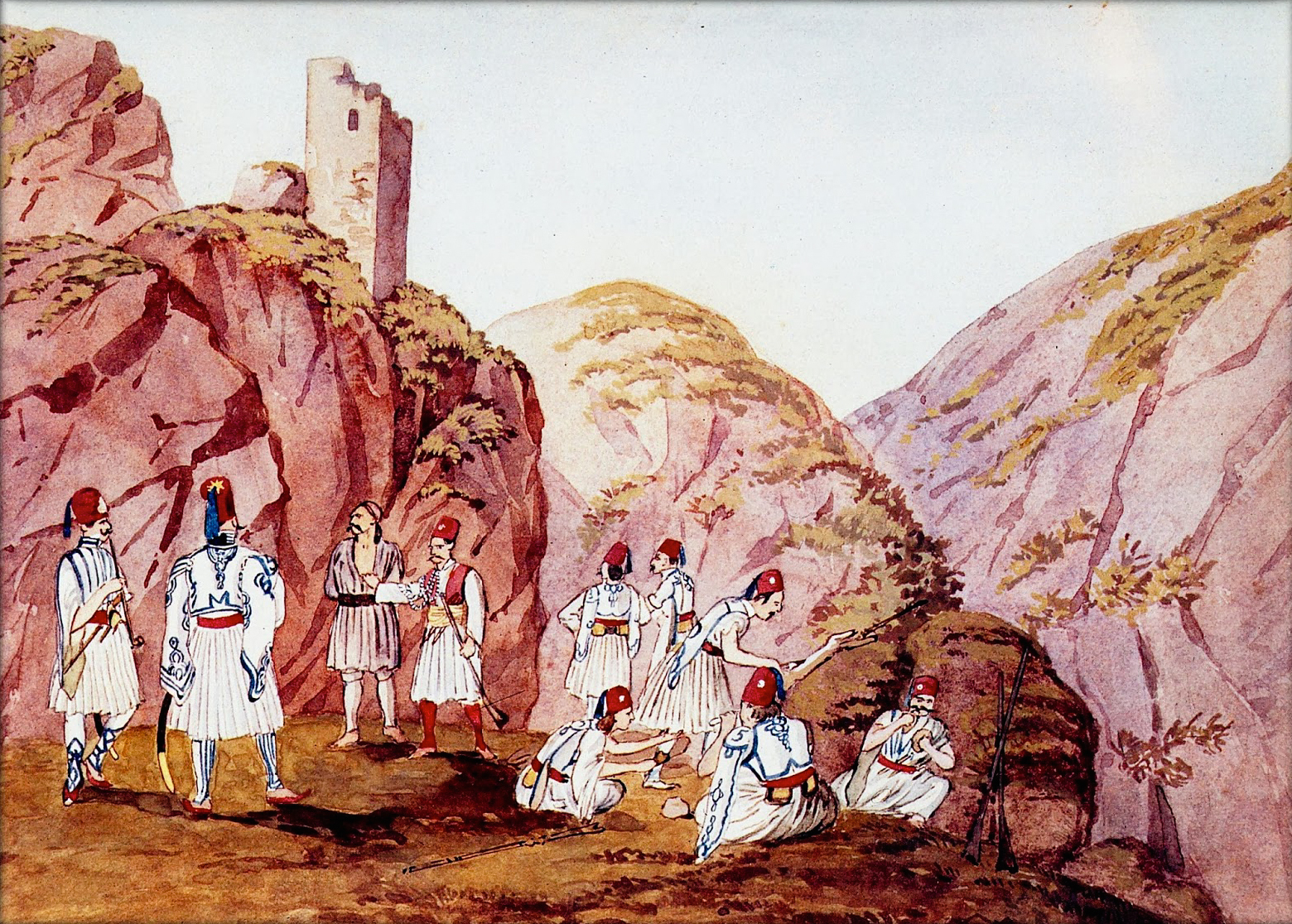
Men of the Mountain Guard battalions with a captive

In March 1833, ten independent battalions of light infantry (termed Ἀκροβολισταί, "Skirmishers", or Κυνηγοί, "Hunters" in Greek) of 204 men and four companies were established. However, because the Western European-style uniforms prescribed for these units were unpopular with many veterans of the War of Independence, recruitment remained very low. In the end, the attempt was given up and in 1836, four Light Infantry Battalions were formed instead, who were allowed to wear a uniform based on the traditional Greek dress. These battalions had six companies each, but with 162 men per company instead of the 120 men in the regular infantry battalions. In January 1838, the four Light Infantry Battalions were merged into two regular infantry battalions (while one of the original four line battalions was disbanded), and replaced by eight "Mountain Guard" battalions (Τάγματα Ὁροφυλακής). Assigned the role of border guards, the Mountain Guard battalions had four companies with 299 men and 16 officers. In February 1838, they were subordinated to three Mountain Guard Headquarters, commanded by a colonel or lieutenant colonel.

In another reorganization in 1843, the regular infantry battalions were reduced to two Line Infantry Battalions of eight companies (including one Evzone company) of 140 men each, and two Skirmisher Battalions of four companies each. At the same time, an additional three light companies were established, which in 1844 were amalgamated into the "Supplementary Mountain Guard Corps" (Παραπληρωματικό Σώμα Ὁροφυλακής). The entire Mountain Guard was then placed directly under the command of the Ministry of Military Affairs, abolishing the Mountain Guard Headquarters. In October 1852, the Mountain Guard was reorganized into four two-battalion regiments.

In August 1854, the Mountain Guard was disbanded and its units converted into three Skirmisher Battalions, while the regular infantry battalions were increased to six. In 1860, the infantry was homogenized into ten infantry battalions of six 120-man companies (one Evzone company), plus ten reserve battalions.

=== Establishment of the Evzone Battalions ===
On 12 December 1868, King George I (r. 1863–1913) signed a Royal Decree authorizing the creation of four independent (αὐθύπαρκτα) Evzone Battalions (Τάγματα Εὐζώνων), "forming part of the Army's regular strength and intended especially for service on the frontier, and in providing assistance to the Gendarmerie". Each battalion was to be commanded by a lieutenant colonel or a major, with a staff of 4 officers and 6 NCOs, and comprising four companies of 122 officers and men each. Their personnel were to be exclusively career and volunteer soldiers, rather than draftees. Prospective recruits had to be of good health and character, over 17 and under 40 years of age, and preferably unmarried. On the same day, due to the precarious security situation, the King also provisionally authorized the creation of eight further Evzone Battalions, numbered 5–12, as well as the increase of each Evzone company's strength to 170. In addition, on the same day a special detachment, initially named Agema (Ἂγημα), the precursor of the modern Presidential Guard, composed of two Evzone infantry companies and a cavalry company, was formed.

=== Eastern Crisis of 1877–1878 ===
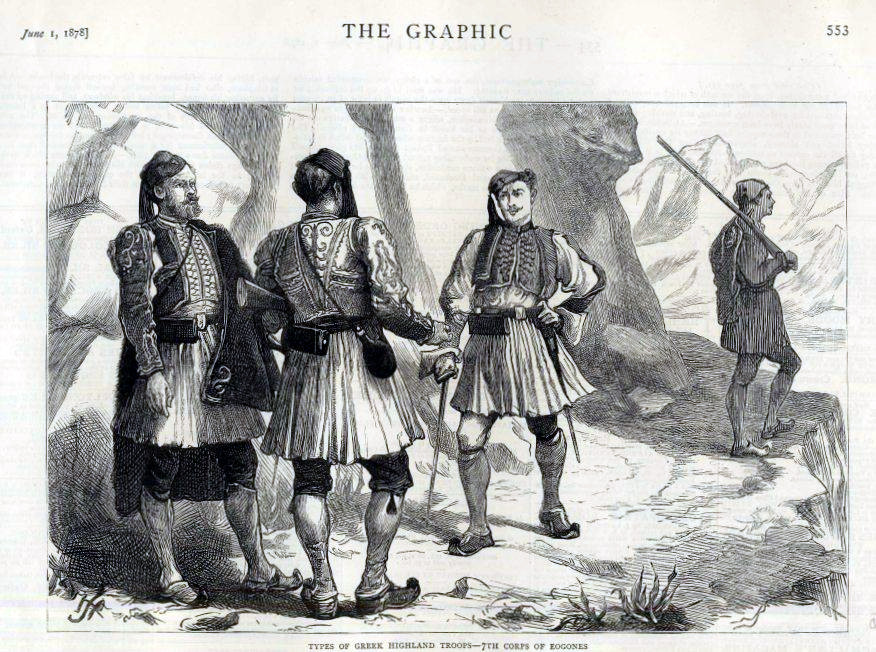
Greek Evzones in 1878

During the Great Eastern Crisis, in 1877, the Hellenic Army was reorganized, with two square infantry divisions being established. The 1st Evzone Battalion at Kravasaras was subordinated to the Patras Brigade, and the 2nd Evzone Battalion at Karpenisi to the Corfu Brigade, with the two brigades comprising the Peloponnese Division. The 3rd Evzone Battalion at Ypati was subordinated to the Athens Brigade, and the 2nd Evzone Battalion at Gardiki to the Missolonghi Brigade, with the two brigades comprising Continental Greece Division.

The 1878 reorganization greatly increased the size of the army, but the Evzone battalions were not affected, with a peacetime strength of 1,968 men (out of 10,400) and an intended wartime strength of 4,160 men (out of 21,000 men). In 1880, another reorganization increased the Evzone units to 11 independent battalions of four companies each, and one training battalion. However, the 1881 army regulations again revised the number to nine Evzone battalions. In 1885, during a reorganization of the infantry, the Evzone battalions of the active army were reduced to eight, but two reserve battalions were established.

=== Greco-Ottoman crisis of 1885–1886 ===
The Hellenic Army was mobilized during the diplomatic crisis with the Ottoman Empire that followed the de facto annexation of Eastern Rumelia to the Principality of Bulgaria in 1885. In May 1886, clashes broke out between Greek and Ottoman troops in Thessaly, and at Koutra, 300 men of the 5th Evzone Battalion surrendered to the Turks. The two captains responsible for the Koutra incident were court-martialled and condemned to death in August 1887, although the death sentence was immediately commuted by the King.

The eight Evzone battalions were retained by to the 1887 regulations issued by the French military mission, but two of them were skeleton formations in peacetime, with only their professional personnel assigned to them.

=== Greco-Turkish War of 1897 and aftermath ===
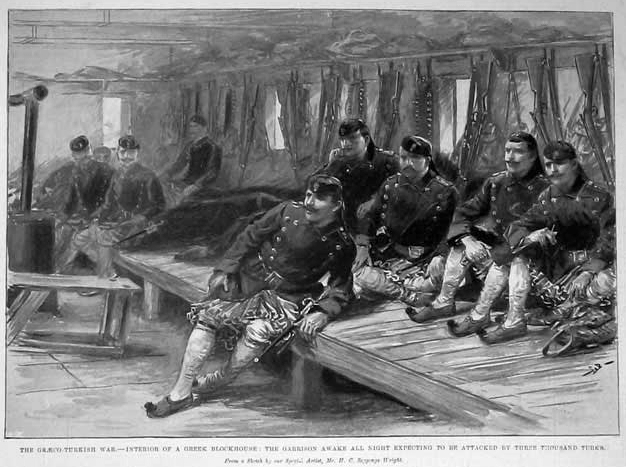
Evzones in a blockhouse during the Greco-Turkish War of 1897

In total, ten Evzone battalions (1st–9th, 11th) fought in the disastrous 1897 war with Ottoman Turkey. The 2nd, 4th, 5th, 6th, 7th, 8th, and 11th Battalions, comprising 6,996 men, fought in the Army of Thessaly, while the 1st, 3rd and 11th Battalions with 4,494 men were subordinated to the Army of Epirus.

In the aftermath of the war, various reorganization attempts were undertaken, and the number of Evzone battalions varied considerably. In June 1900, two Evzone regiments were established by combining some of the hitherto independent battalions: the 1st Evzone Regiment (1ο Σύνταγμα Ευζώνων) comprised the 6th, 8th, and 9th Evzone Battalions, and the 2nd Evzone Regiment (2ο Σύνταγμα Ευζώνων) the 1st and 4th Evzone Battalions. The new army regulations composed in 1903–04 combined the 1st and 2nd Evzone Regiments in the 1st Brigade under the 1st Infantry Division, with an additional Evzone Battalion (1st–3rd) attached to each of the three infantry divisions.

This structure was not of long duration, however, as in 1904, a new, more homogeneous divisional structure was adopted, with four regular infantry regiments and two Evzone battalions for each of the three infantry divisions. 1st Division now comprised the 4th and 6th Evzone Battalions, 2nd Infantry Division the 1st and 2nd Evzone Battalions, and 3rd Infantry Division the 3rd and 7th Evzone Battalions. The 1910 army regulations envisaged again nine Evzone Battalions (alongside 18 infantry regiments), but the 1912 regulations reduced them again to six, each of four companies and two machine gun squads.

=== Balkan Wars, World War I, Asia Minor and World War II ===
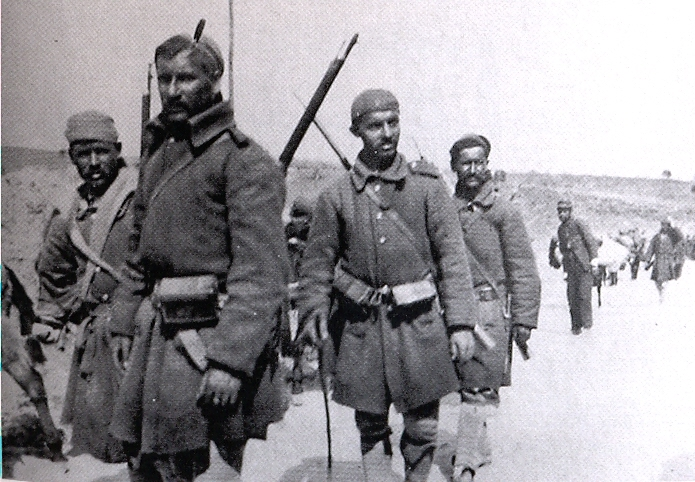
Evzones in campaign uniform during the Balkan Wars

In the mobilization prior to the outbreak of the Balkan Wars in 1912, four more Evzone battalions were raised. They operated independently on the vanguard or the flanks of the army. They distinguished themselves for their fighting spirit suffering high casualties, especially among officers.

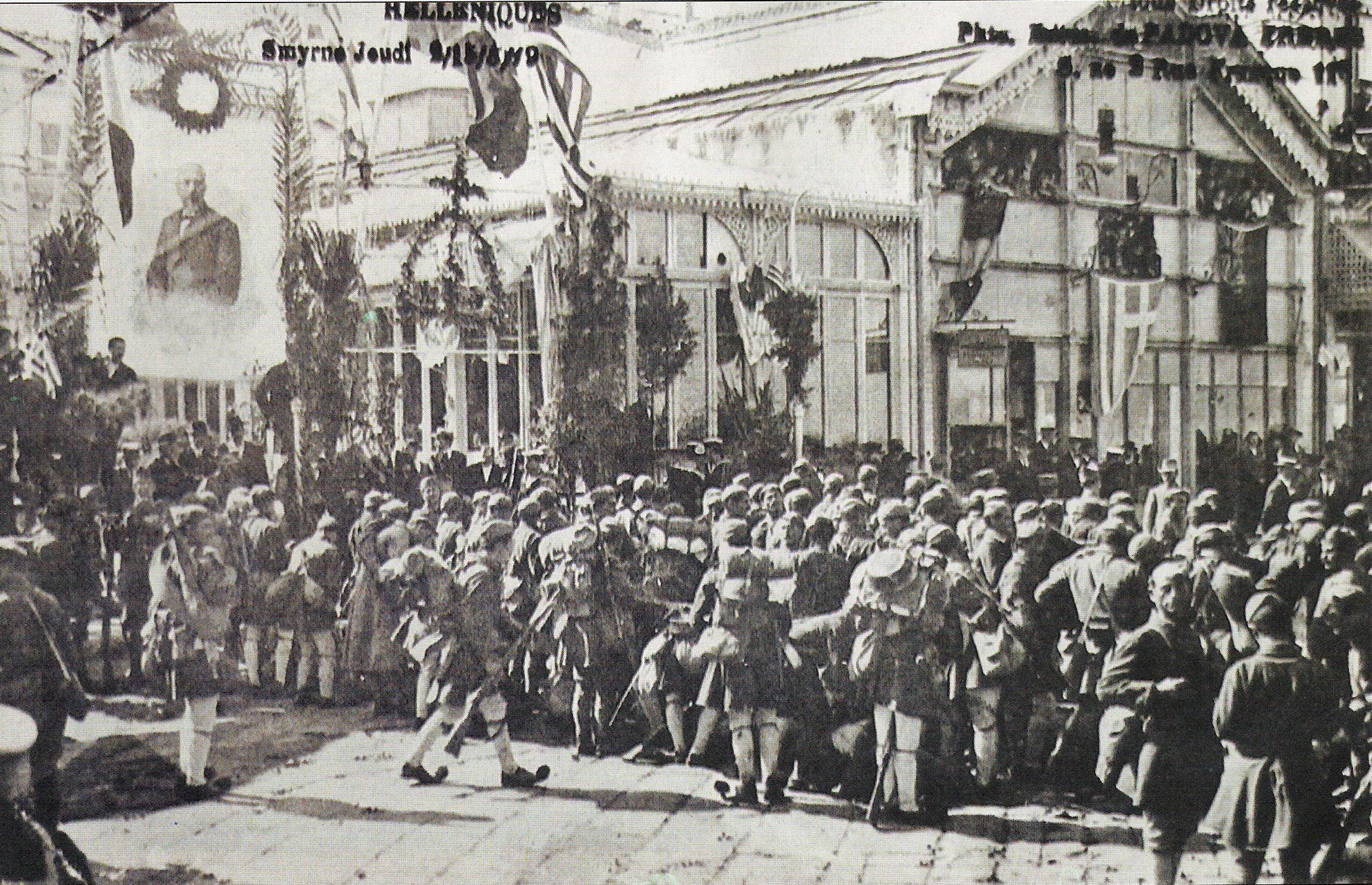
Evzones landing at Smyrna, May 1919

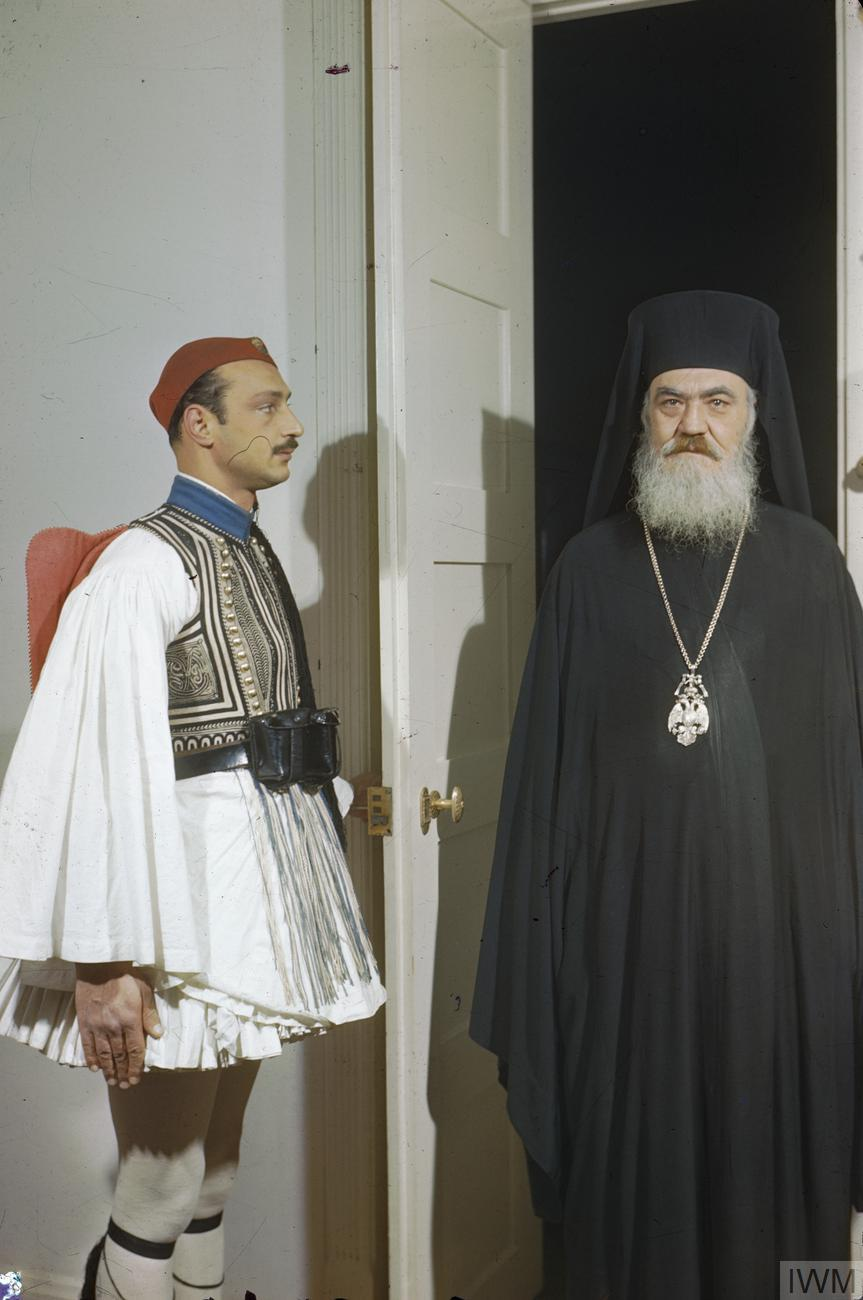
An Evzone of the Royal Guard with Regent Damaskinos of Athens, 1945

Subsequently the Evzone units were increased to five regiments, which fought with distinction as elite shock troops in the First World War, the Greco-Turkish War (1919–1922) and the Greco-Italian War.

During the German invasion in 1941, a memorable event is said to have occurred: on April 27, as the German Army was entering Athens, the Germans ascended to the Acropolis of Athens and ordered the young Evzone who was guarding the flag post, Konstantinos Koukidis, to haul the Greek flag down and replace it with the swastika flag. The young soldier supposedly did so, but refused to hand over the Greek flag to the Germans, and instead wrapped himself in it and leapt from the Acropolis to his death. However, the event has not been confirmed by historic research, and no evidence of the existence of an Evzone or other soldier by the name Konstantinos Koukidis had been found in the archives of the Greek Armed Forces as well as in Greek public institutions.

After the occupation of the country, in 1943, the collaborationist government raised a number of "Security Battalions" (Τάγματα Ασφαλείας), which were dressed in the Evzone uniform and participated in operations against the EAM-ELAS partisans. They were derisively known as Γερμανοτσολιάδες ("German Evzones") or Ταγματασφαλίτες ("Security Battalionists"), and were disbanded after liberation in 1944.

=== Post-war history ===
After the war, the reconstituted Hellenic Army did not re-establish the Evzone regiments, possibly due to their association with the collaborationist Security Battalions. Their elite status and role being assumed by the newly established Mountain Raiding Companies. The traditions and distinctions of the Evzones are, however, maintained by a special ceremonial unit, which has served under several names: Palace Guard (Ανακτορική Φρουρά), Flag Guard (Φρουρά Σημαίας), Tomb of the Unknown Soldier Guard (Φρουρά Μνημείου Αγνώστου Στρατιώτη), Royal Guard (Βασιλική Φρουρά) and after 1974, with the abolition of the Greek monarchy, the Presidential Guard (Προεδρική Φρουρά). Several modern regular Army Infantry units have been given the numbers and names of the post-1913 Evzone regiments, but these names are only honorific.

== Former units ==
The historical units were numbered and known as Τάγμα Ευζώνων ("Evzone Battalion") or Σύνταγμα Ευζώνων ("Evzone Regiment"). The first Evzone Regiment was formed in 1912, shortly before the outbreak of the Balkan Wars. The "traditional" and well-known Evzone regiments, which fought in World War I, the Asia Minor Campaign, and World War II, were formed after the Balkan Wars by the Royal Decree of 23 December 1913. Since the regiments were distinctive, elite units, they had dual numbers—the first, numbering them in the Evzones order of seniority, the second, in the overall infantry hierarchy. Thus the 5/42 Evzone Regiment was the 5th Evzone regiment, but also the 42nd infantry regiment.

- 1/38 Evzone Regiment, the former 1st Evzone Regiment, based in Karditsa and recruited in Thessaly
- 2/39 Evzone Regiment, based in Missolonghi and recruited in Aetolia-Acarnania
- 3/40 Evzone Regiment, based in Arta and recruited in Epirus
- 4/41 Evzone Regiment, based in Veroia and recruited in western Macedonia
- 5/42 Evzone Regiment, based in Lamia and recruited in Central Greece

== Uniform ==
In 1833, the uniform of the Evzones (as in all infantry companies of the line battalions) was in the unpopular Bavarian style of blue trousers, tailcoats and shako. As light infantry the Evzones were distinguished only by green braid and plumes. In 1837, a new uniform was created; based on the traditional fustanella style worn by the klephts, armatoli, and many of the best-known fighters of the Greek War of Independence. At first, it was only issued to the native light infantry battalions, but its popularity led to its adoption as the official uniform of the Evzones in 1868.

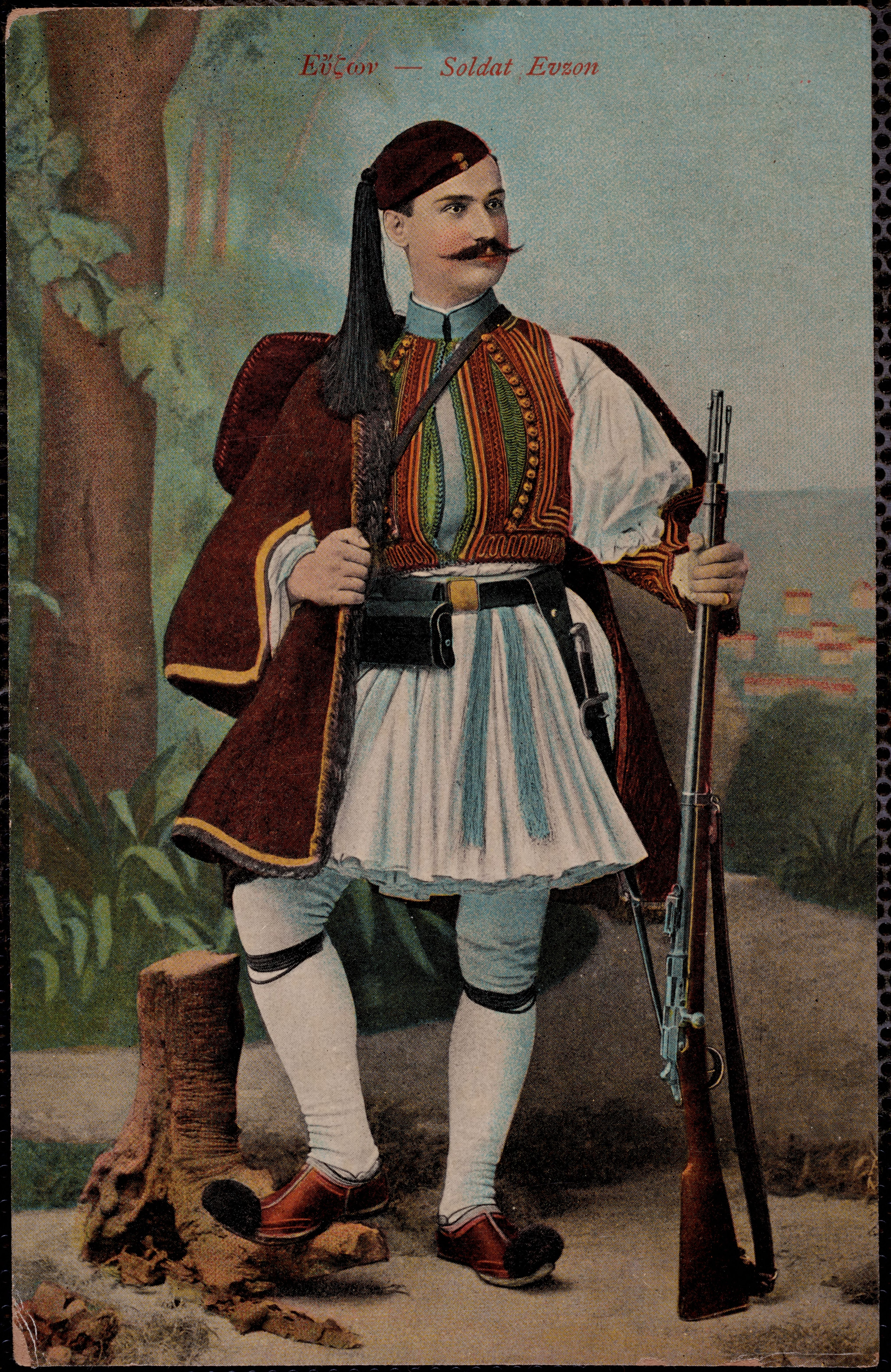
Εύζων = Soldat Evzon, [ca. 1907–1915]. Nicholas Catsimpoolas Collection, Boston Public Library

In the 1868 regulations, officers and warrant officers continued wearing the regular Army uniform, but the other ranks of the Evzone battalions were issued a special uniform with a white wool jacket (Greek: φέρμελη) with dark blue cord embroidery (Greek: γαϊτάνια), with the battalion number embroidered in crimson at the end of each sleeve. The jacket was also decorated with two rows of twelve yellow metal buttons on the chest, and eight on the sleeves. A fez (φέσιον) with a silk tassel, bearing the national cockade and the royal crown was worn; plus a knee-length fustanella of white cloth, closed by a belt of cotton in blue and white stripes. The number of pleats of the fustanella is rumored to be equal to the duration of Ottoman occupation i.e. 400. On the legs were worn tsarouchia, with white wool leggings and garters; the former decorated in dark blue embroidery. For bad weather, an "iron-coloured" knee-length cape was issued.

During the remainder of the 19th century, the dress of the separate line battalions of Evzones appears to have differed slightly in detail between units. After a few minor changes over the years, it became the familiar uniform seen worn today by the Presidential Guard. In 1910 a new field service uniform was adopted, substituting a khaki farion cap and khaki doulama jacket for the respectively red and dark blue garments previously worn. The long white woollen hose and turned-up tsarouchia shoes were still retained, although sometimes replaced on campaign by the standard khaki trousers and leather boots of the line infantry. The khaki and off-white field uniform of 1910 was still being worn during the Greek-Italian War of 1940–41, although without the red collar piping and shoulder straps of the earlier uniform. The traditional black fez tassel, and large pompoms on the footwear, were usually removed before battle.

== Sources ==
- Lefkoparidis, Xenofon, ed. (1965a). Στρατηγοῦ Π. Γ. Δαγκλῆ: Ἀναμνήσεις-Ἒγγραφα-Ἀλληλογραφία. Το Ἀρχείον του [General P. G. Danglis: Memoirs-Documents-Correspondence. His Archive] (in Greek). Vol. A. Athens: Βιβλιοπωλείον Ε. Γ. Βαγιονάκη.
- Myles, Gus (2014). Επιχείρηση ΜΑΝΝΑ [Operation MANNA] (in Greek). Athens: AO. ISBN 978-960-9484-53-4.
- Mylonas, Yiannis (1998). Οι Εύζωνοι (in Greek). Athens: Ioannis Floros. ISBN 960-7178-39-4.
- Η ιστορία της οργάνωσης του Ελληνικού Στρατού, 1821–1954 [History of the Organization of the Hellenic Army, 1821–1954] (in Greek). Athens: Hellenic Army Historical Directorate. 2005. ISBN 960-7897-45-5.
