= Presidential Guard (Greece) =

Ceremonial guards

- Προεδρική Φρουρά
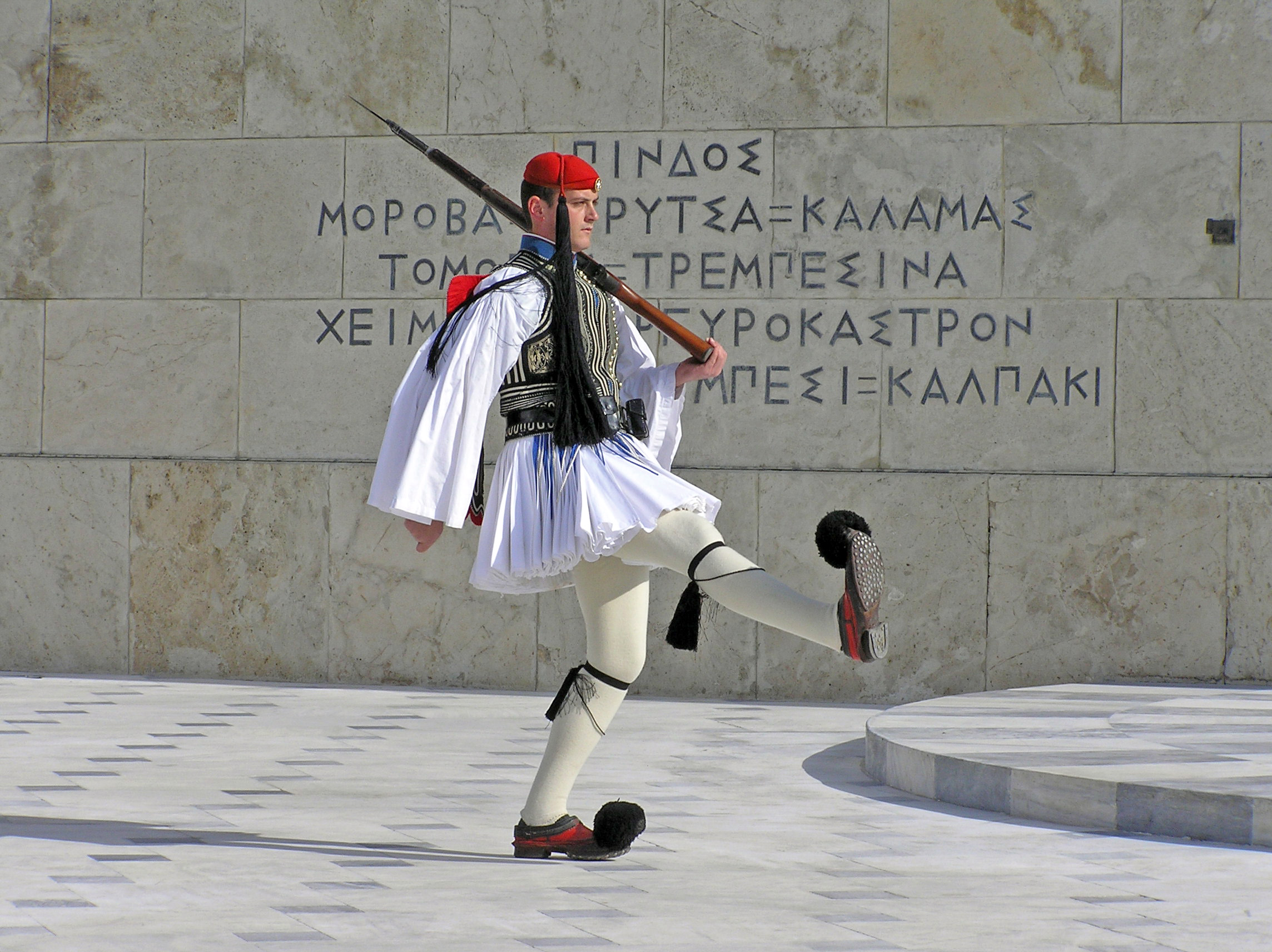
- Evzone guarding the Tomb of the Unknown Soldier in Athens wearing the full dress uniform
- Active: 24 December [O.S. 12 December] 1868 – present
- Country: Greece
- Branch: Hellenic Army
- Type: Infantry, ceremonial guards; formerly including cavalry
- Size: Battalion
- Garrison/HQ: Georgios Tzavellas Camp, Athens
- March: Evzonaki
- Rifle: M1 Garand (ceremonial duties); Heckler & Koch G3 (service)

Insignia
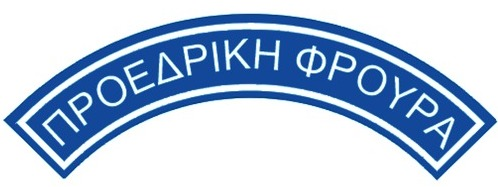
- Shoulder patch (service uniform)

The Presidential Guard (Greek: Προεδρική Φρουρά, romanized: Proedrikí Frourá) is a ceremonial infantry unit that guards the Tomb of the Unknown Soldier and the Presidential Mansion in Athens, Greece. The unit is distinguished as the last unit of Evzones in the Hellenic Army, and is closely associated with the traditional Evzone's uniform, which evolved from the clothes worn by the klephts in the Greek War of Independence. The most visible item of this uniform is the fustanella, a kilt-like garment. In 1868–1914 and 1937–1973 (with interruptions), the guard also included a cavalry company.

== History ==
The present Presidential Guard was first established by Royal Decree on 24 December [O.S. 12 December] 1868, as an independent battalion-sized unit, called the Agema (Greek: Ἂγημα, "escort"), and comprising a staff, two Evzone infantry companies, and one cavalry company. The commander was to be a colonel or general officer, with a major as his deputy; the staff was further complemented by five junior officers and 15 NCOs and adjutants. Each infantry company comprised 4 officers and 115 NCOs and men, and the cavalry company 4 officers and 96 NCOs and men. All NCOs were to be of excellent conduct, with at least four years service in the Army or the Gendarmerie, literate, and at least 1,64 m in height. To add to its prestige, all NCOs and men of the Agema ranked one rank higher than their nominal rank, so that all ordinary soldiers were equivalent to a lance corporal. In addition, it was given the right to stand always to the right (the position of honour) of all other units deployed in a line, was removed from the authority of any other military jurisdiction other than that of its commander, and was assigned 50 ordinary soldiers to take care of all menial tasks and to serve as orderlies to the officers.

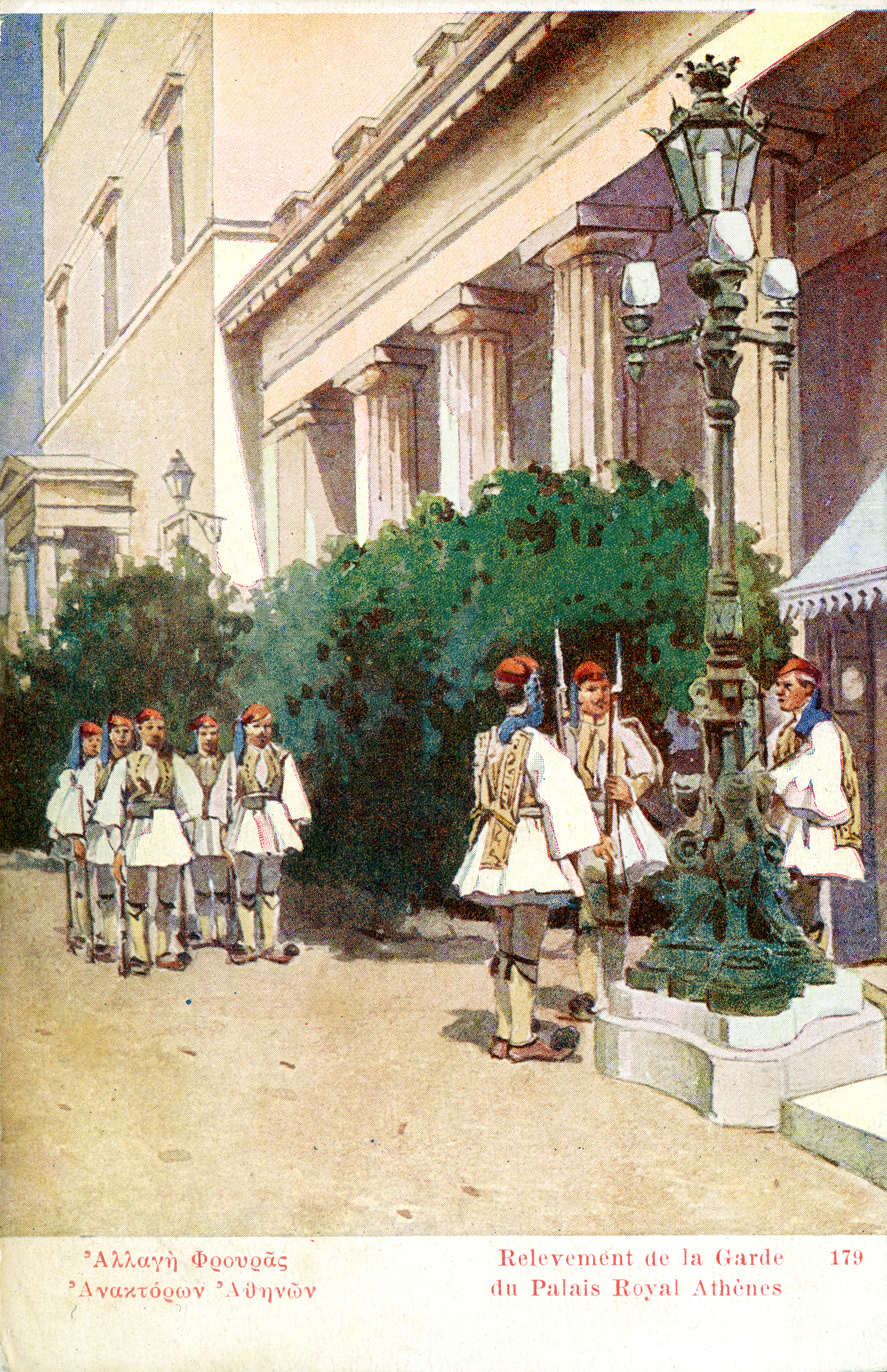
Change of the guard at the Old Royal Palace, early 20th century

Its composition remained unaltered during the reign of King George I (r. 1863–1913), but under his successor, King Constantine I (r. 1913–1917, 1920–1922), a Royal Decree on 21 March 1914 reorganized it as the Palace Guard (Ἀνακτορική Φρουρά), comprising just two platoons, one of Evzones, and one of Cretans. Due to the National Schism, where the Cretans supported the King's opponent, the Cretan-born Eleftherios Venizelos, the Cretan platoon was abolished in 1916.

On 24 March 1924, with King George II (r. 1922–1924, 1935–1946) having already left the country, the monarchy was abolished and the Second Hellenic Republic proclaimed. Law 4321 of 1926 established a Guard Company of the President of the Republic (Λόχος Φρουρᾶς τοῡ Προέδρου τῆς Δημοκρατίας) of c. 250 men as replacement for the Palace Guard. Following the restoration of the monarchy under George II in 1935, the Presidential Guard Company was again renamed to Palace Guard and then Royal Guard (Βασιλική Φρουρά). By 1937, the Royal Guard Cavalry Company (Ἴλη Βασιλικῆς Φρουρᾶς) had also been reconstituted.

Following the Battle of Greece in April 1941 and the onset of the occupation by the Axis powers, King George II and the government left the country, but the guard remained in Athens; numbering some 150 men, it continued to guard the Tomb of the Unknown Soldier, under the designation of Flag Guard (Φρουρά Σημαῖας) and Guard of the Unknown Soldier (Φρουρά Ἀγνώστου Στρατιώτη). It retained the name of Flag Guard even after liberation in 1944, since the issue of the monarchy was left open. Only with the referendum of 1946 was the monarchy confirmed, and King George II returned from exile, whereupon the guard resumed the designations of Palace Guard and Royal Guard. During the Greek Civil War, its strength was increased to 300 men, being reduced after to 250.

In 1973, following the abolition of the monarchy by the dictator Georgios Papadopoulos, the guard was renamed as the Presidential Guard (Προεδρική Φρουρά). The Guard's Cavalry Company was permanently disbanded shortly after. Following the restoration of democracy in 1974, the guard retained the name of Presidential Guard, which it bears to this day.

In 2018, the Saint George of Ioannina (a Neomartyr), also called Fustanellas (Φουστανελάς) meaning wearing the fustanella, proclaimed patron Saint of Presidential Guard.

== Present ==
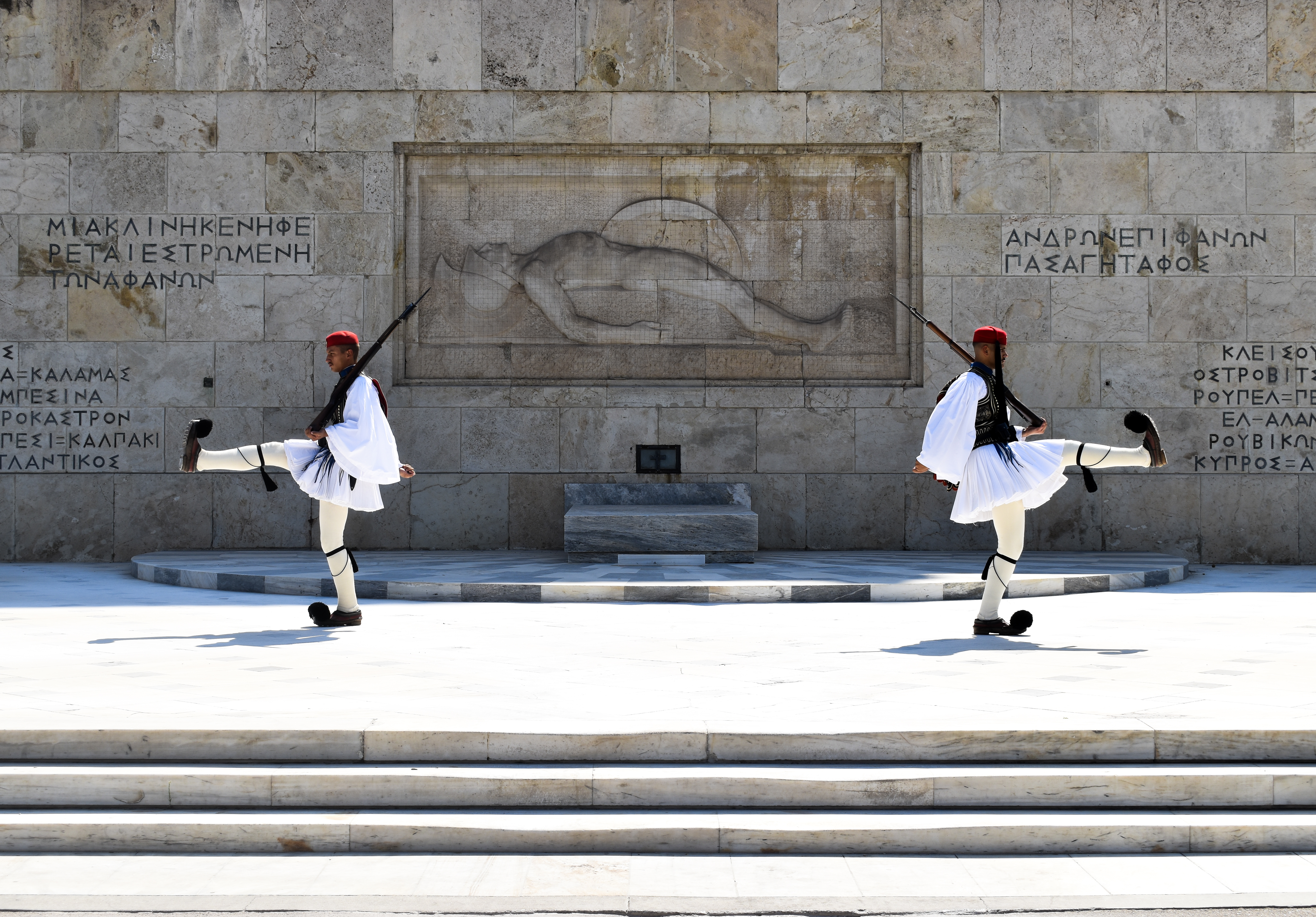
Two evzones at the Tomb of the Unknown Soldier during the Grand Change, 2024

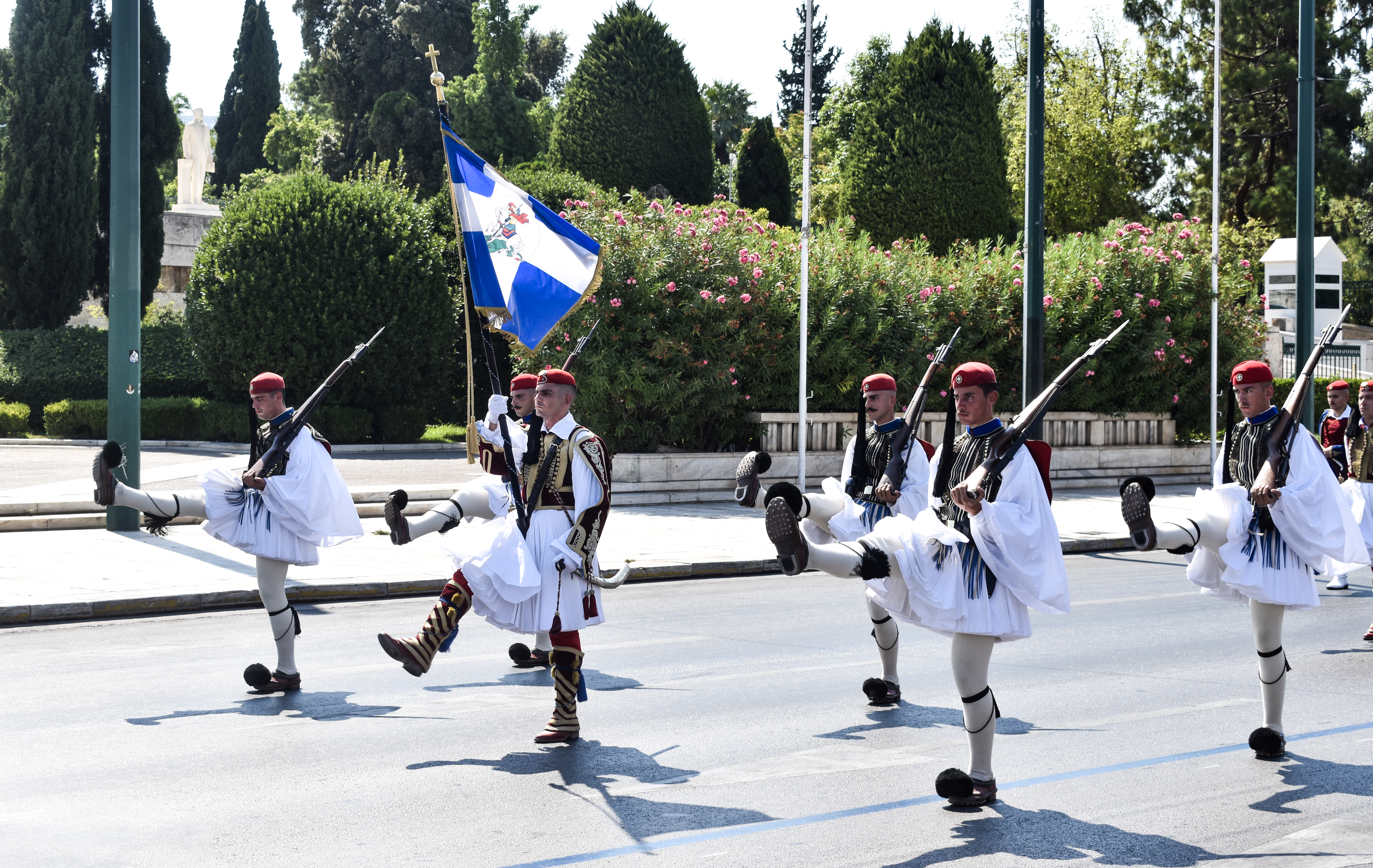
March during the Grand Change, 2024

The Presidential Guard is a purely ceremonial unit, charged with providing permanent ceremonial guard detachments of two Evzones each for the Tomb of the Unknown Soldier and the entrance to the Presidential Mansion, and one Evzone for its own barracks, the Georgios Tzavellas Camp, situated directly in front of the Presidential Mansion. It also provides personnel for the solemn raising and lowering of the Greek flag on the Acropolis of Athens on Sundays and official holidays. In addition, they pay tribute to the foreign delegations that visit the Greek president, they receive the Holy Fire from Jerusalem on Easter and they participate on event concerning celebration of national holidays in Greece and abroad, most notably during the Greek Independence Day celebrations on 25 March in New York and Chicago. Detachments of the Guard have also occasionally participated in Greek Independence Day celebrations in Melbourne, Philadelphia, and elsewhere.

The Guard takes precedence in all military parades. Their march style consists of normal march time, and at intervals, for several paces, striking the ground forcefully with the right foot. Their standard marching music is the "Evzonaki" ("little Evzone") (Greek: Ευζωνάκι) march, played at 48 beats/min. Guards on duty perform their movements in a very slow and highly stylized manner. They switch positions with each other every fifteen minutes and remain completely motionless and at attention in the meantime. Since the Guards are required to be totally still at all times, there is one Evzone in normal fatigues uniform and police surveillance to ensure that no one approaches or harasses the Guards while on duty. The "little changes" take place every hour on the hour, and involve the two incoming and two outgoing sentries, and a supervising "Corporal of the Change". The Grand Change takes place at 11 am on Sunday mornings, and involves the whole Guard with its officers and a military band, all marching from the Guard Barracks to the Tomb for the Change, and back. The Grand Change is a popular Sunday morning spectacle for Athenians and tourists alike.

During a demonstration in front of the Parliament in 2001, a Molotov cocktail was thrown at one of the guardhouses. The wooden construction was engulfed in flames. The Evzone on guard next to it remained in place until an officer gave him the order to move. With a scorched and partly smoking uniform on one side, the Evzone did so.

In January 2010, a makeshift bomb was placed 20 meters from where the Evzones guard the Tomb of the Unknown Soldier, at Syntagma Square. Although the police informed the Evzones of the imminent threat, the Guards refused to leave their posts and remained on guard while the bomb exploded.

All Evzones are volunteers drawn from the Hellenic Army's Infantry Corps. Prospective Evzones are initially identified at the Infantry Recruit Training Centres during Basic Training; there is a minimum height requirement of 1.87 metres (6 feet 2 inches) to join.

== Uniform ==
=== Ceremonial uniforms ===
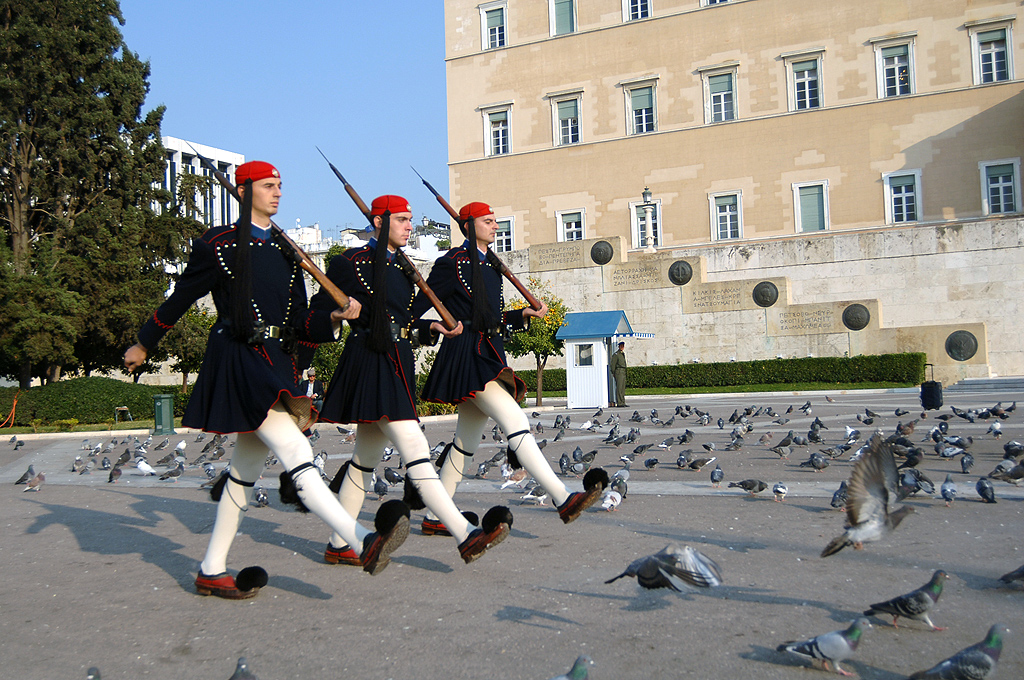
Evzones in winter everyday dress arrive for the change of the guard, 2009

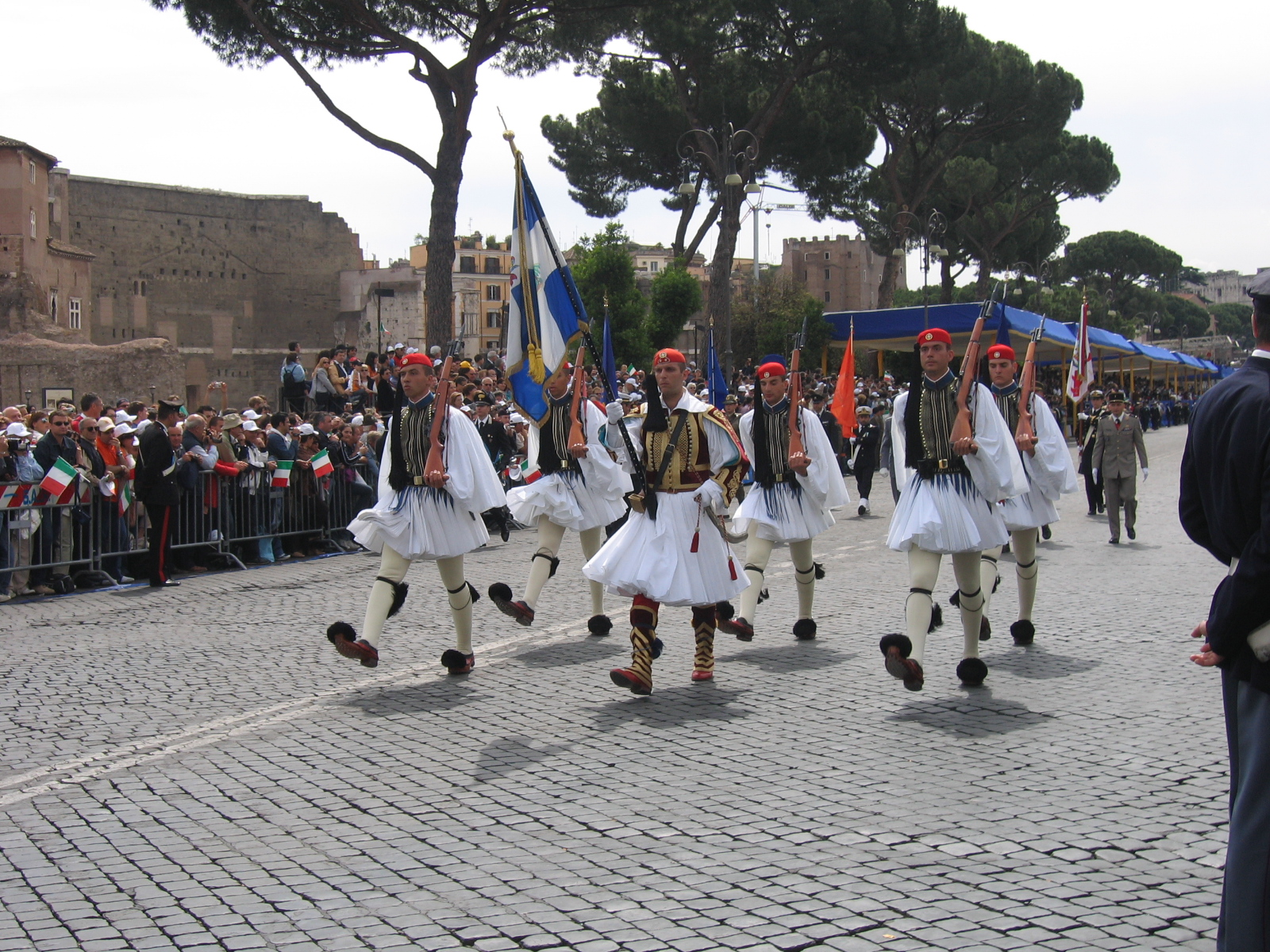
Evzone regimental standard party during the Italian Republic Day parade, 2006

The present-day ceremonial uniform consists of the following items:

- Farion (φάριον), a scarlet fez with a long black silk tassel, with the national emblem on the front.
- Doulamas (plural: doulamades) (ντουλαμάς, plural: ντουλαμάδες), a long tunic which is the everyday uniform. There are winter and summer versions. The basic color of the winter doulamas is navy blue and it closely resembles the service uniform worn until 1910, while the summer version is light khaki, and similar in design to the field uniform adopted by the Evzone regiments after that date.
- Foustanella (φουστανέλα), a cotton kilt made from 30 meters (98 feet) of white cloth, with supposedly 400 pleats (πιέτες) representing the 400 years of Ottoman occupation. The foustanella derives from the traditional uniform of Continental Greece.
- Ypoditis (υποδήτης), a white shirt with very wide sleeves.
- Fermeli (φέρμελη), the waistcoat. Various traditional designs are embroidered on it in white or gilt thread. Yellow stripes on the lower sleeves indicate the military rank of the wearer. Sergeants have two stripes and corporals have one.
- Krossia (κρόσσια), fringes in blue and white, the colors of the Greek flag.
- Epiknimides (επικνημίδες) or Knemidodetes (κνημιδοδέτες), unofficially called kaltsodetes (καλτσοδέτες), the garters. They are made of black silk.
- Periskelides (περισκελίδες), white woollen stockings, two on each leg.
- Anaspastos (ανάσπαστος), inside garter which holds the periskelides in position.
- Tsarouchia (τσαρούχια, singular: τσαρούχι), red leather clogs with black pompons (φούντες, fountes; singular: φούντα, founta). Under the sole, depending on the size, there are 60 to 120 nails. On average each tsarouchi weighs approximately 1.5 kilos (3.5 pounds).
- A black leather cartridge belt which has a bayonet belt holder case.
- When it is very cold the Evzones wear a dark blue cape (κάπα). This was formerly part of the field uniform until replaced by a khaki version in 1910.

They are armed with a M1 Garand semi-automatic rifle, with bayonet.

Everyday uniform consists of the farion, doulamas, stockings, garters, and tsarouchia. Formal dress, which is worn on Sundays, on important national holidays, at the reception of foreign dignitaries and on other special occasions, consists of the farion, ypoditis, foustanela, fermeli, krossia, stockings, garters and tsarouchia.

The first king of modern Greece, Otto, often wore this uniform in public. Today, many Greek boys dress up as tsoliades on Greek Independence Day.

=== Island and Pontic variants ===
Members of the Guard can also sometimes be seen in a royal blue and red uniform based on the traditional male costume of the Aegean Islands or in a uniform based on the black traditional habit once worn by the Pontic Greeks. These variants are worn on ceremonial occasions where there is a requirement for Evzones to undertake "unarmed" duties (such as flag-raising ceremonies, commemorations), usually alongside armed Evzones dressed in the formal ceremonial uniform.

While predominantly Cretan in origin - it is sometimes, incorrectly, called the Cretan Uniform (Greek: Κρητική Στολή; Kritikí Stolí) - the Island Uniform (Greek: Νησιωτική Στολή; Nisiotikí Stolí) incorporates elements from various costumes of the Aegean Islands. It consists of a tassel-less fez (Greek: φάριον; fárion), Cretan-style coat in blue with a red vest and white shirt, the distinctive blue islander breeches (Greek: βράκα; vráka), Cretan-style belt with a Cretan knife and white leather thigh-high boots (Greek: στιβάνια, stivánia). An Evzone wearing the Island uniform is also called a Vrakofόros (Greek: Bρακοφόρος, literally a "wearer of breeches").

The Pontic Uniform (Greek: Ποντιακή Στολή; Pontiakí Stolí) is only worn on May 19, in commemoration of the Greek genocide.

=== Officers' uniform ===
The uniform of the officers is closer to the original dress worn by the klephts. Its main differences are the longer foustanella, the more elaborate fermeli in tyrian purple with gold embroidery, whose sleeves are worn closed on the arms instead of being fastened to the coat, red-and-gold gaiters (Greek: τουζλούκια; touzloúkia) that cover the whole lower leg worn over red trousers, and red boots (Greek: σταβάλια; stavália). Their rank is indicated below the national emblem on the farion, and they are armed with a pála, a kilij-style sword, replica of the sword used by the chieftains during the Greek war of independence.

The uniforms (of the officers and the soldiers) are completely handmade. They are sewn and maintained by civilian personnel of the Presidential Guard in workshops in the camp.

=== Service uniform ===
The Evzones wear the regular Hellenic Army uniform when not in guard service. They are distinguished from the other Army units by an azure beret and blue embroidered patches on the shoulders which have white letters that form the words: ΠΡΟΕΔΡΙΚΗ ΦΡΟΥΡΑ (Proedriki Froura, "Presidential Guard").

=== Uniforms gallery ===
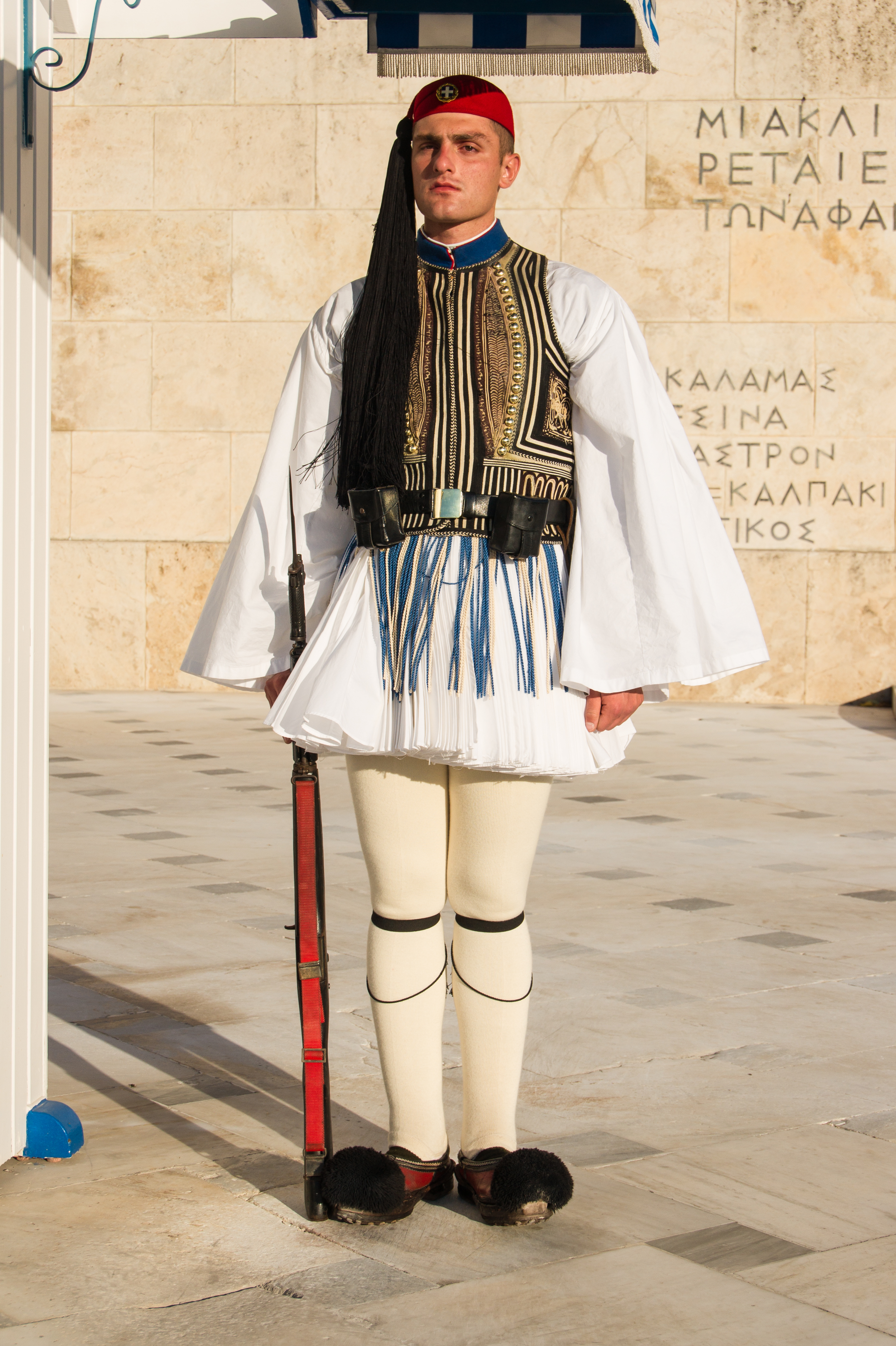
Full dress ceremonial uniform

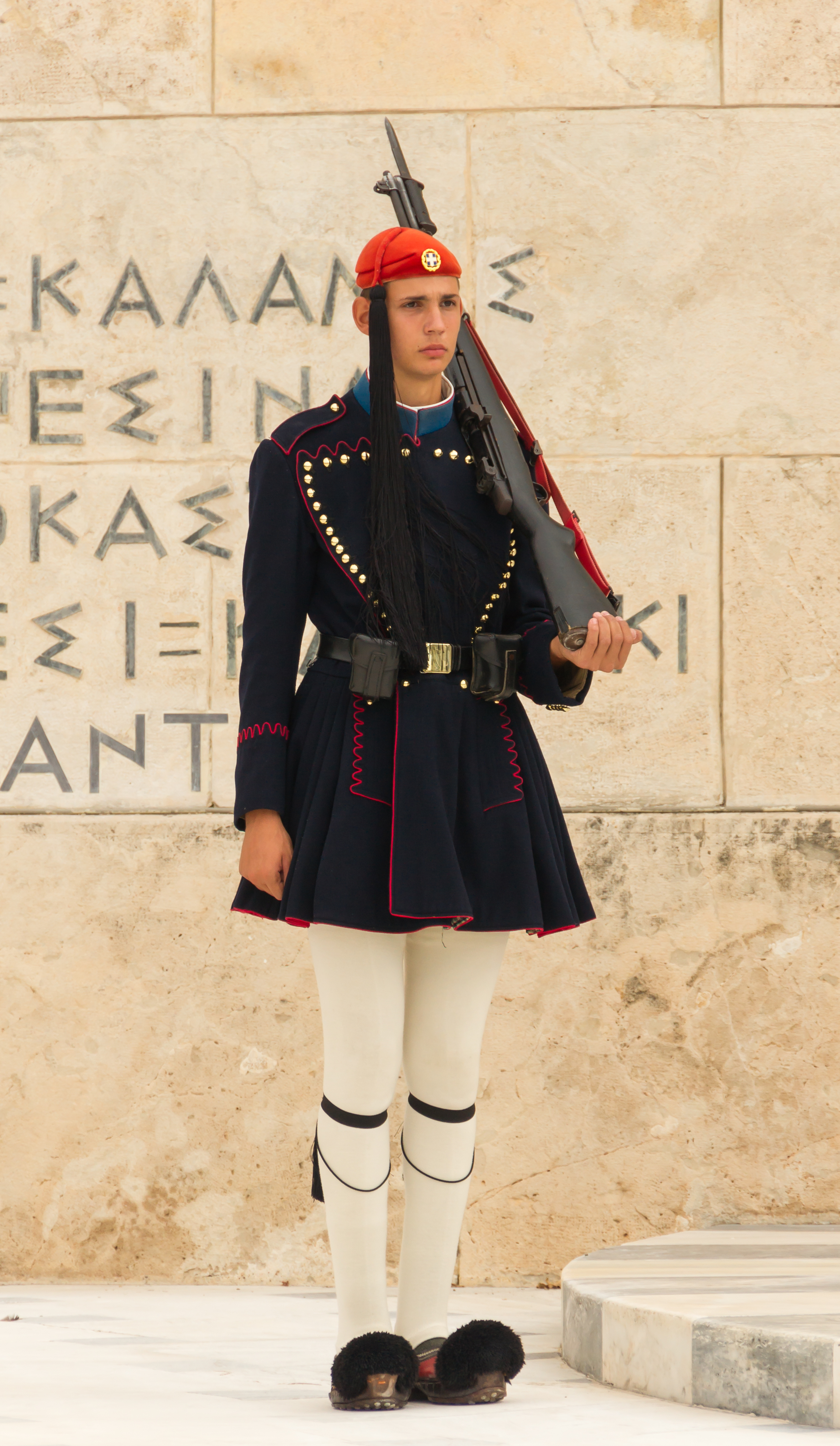
Winter everyday ceremonial uniform

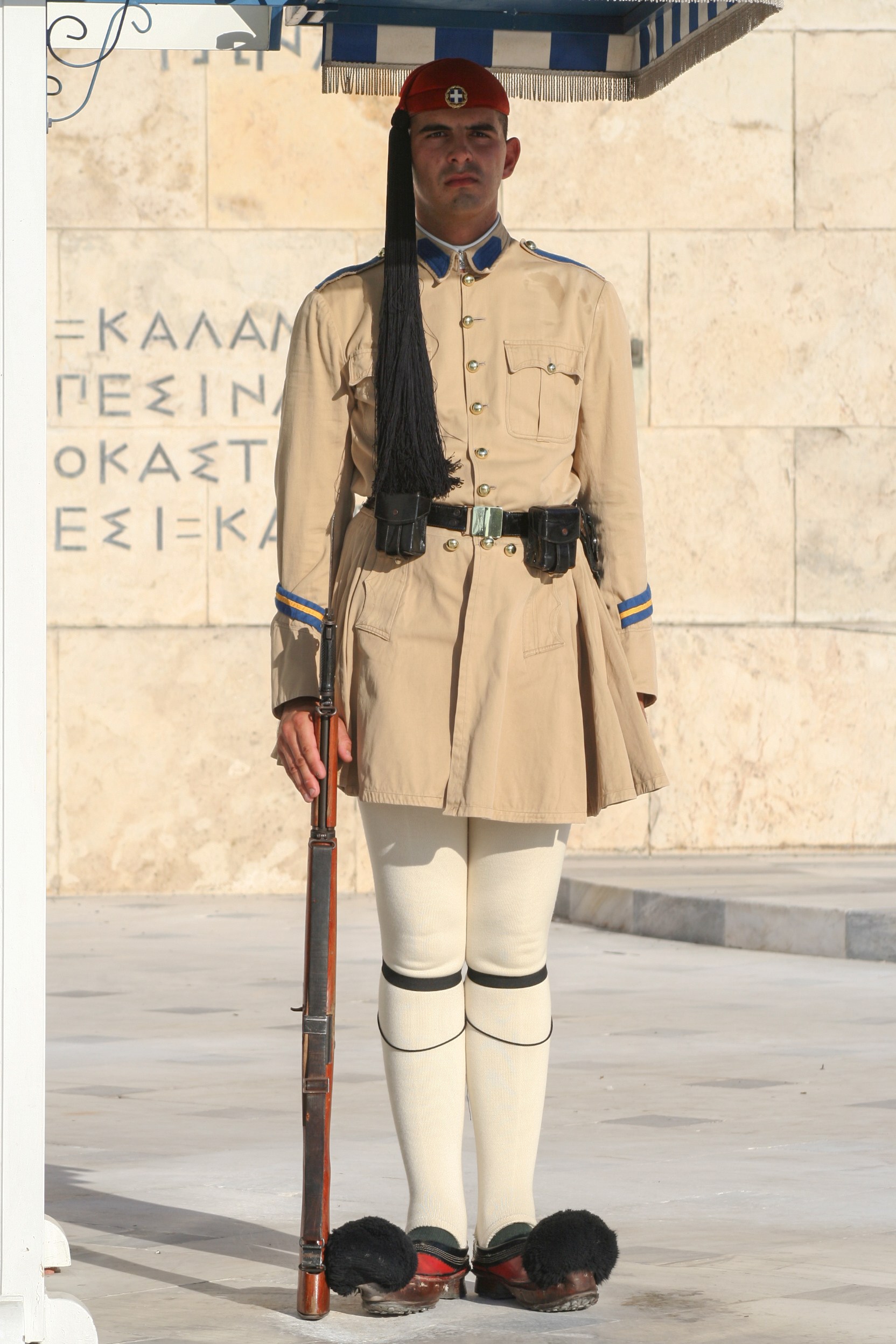
Summer everyday ceremonial uniform

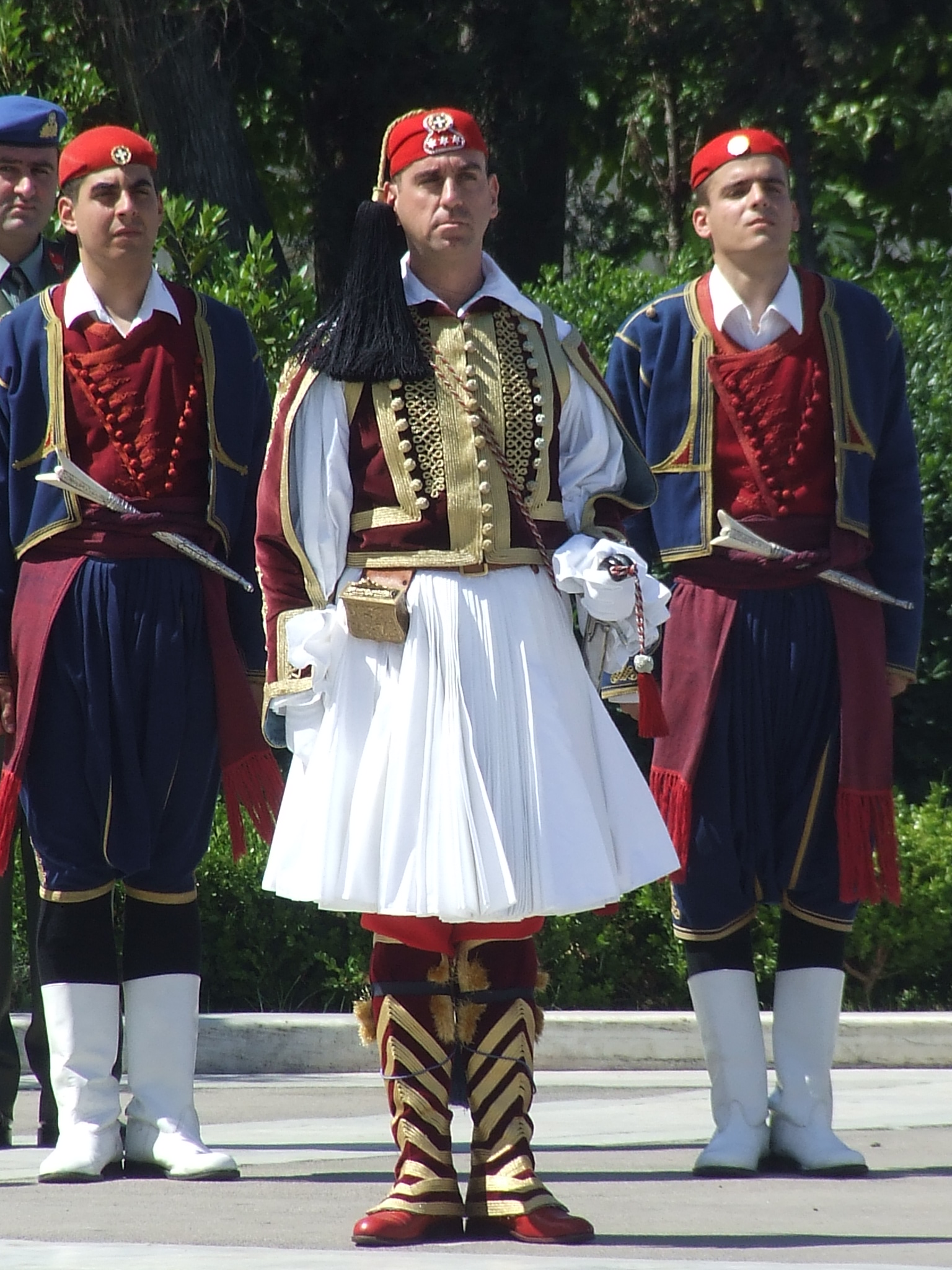
Officer dress ceremonial uniform and Evzone islander uniform

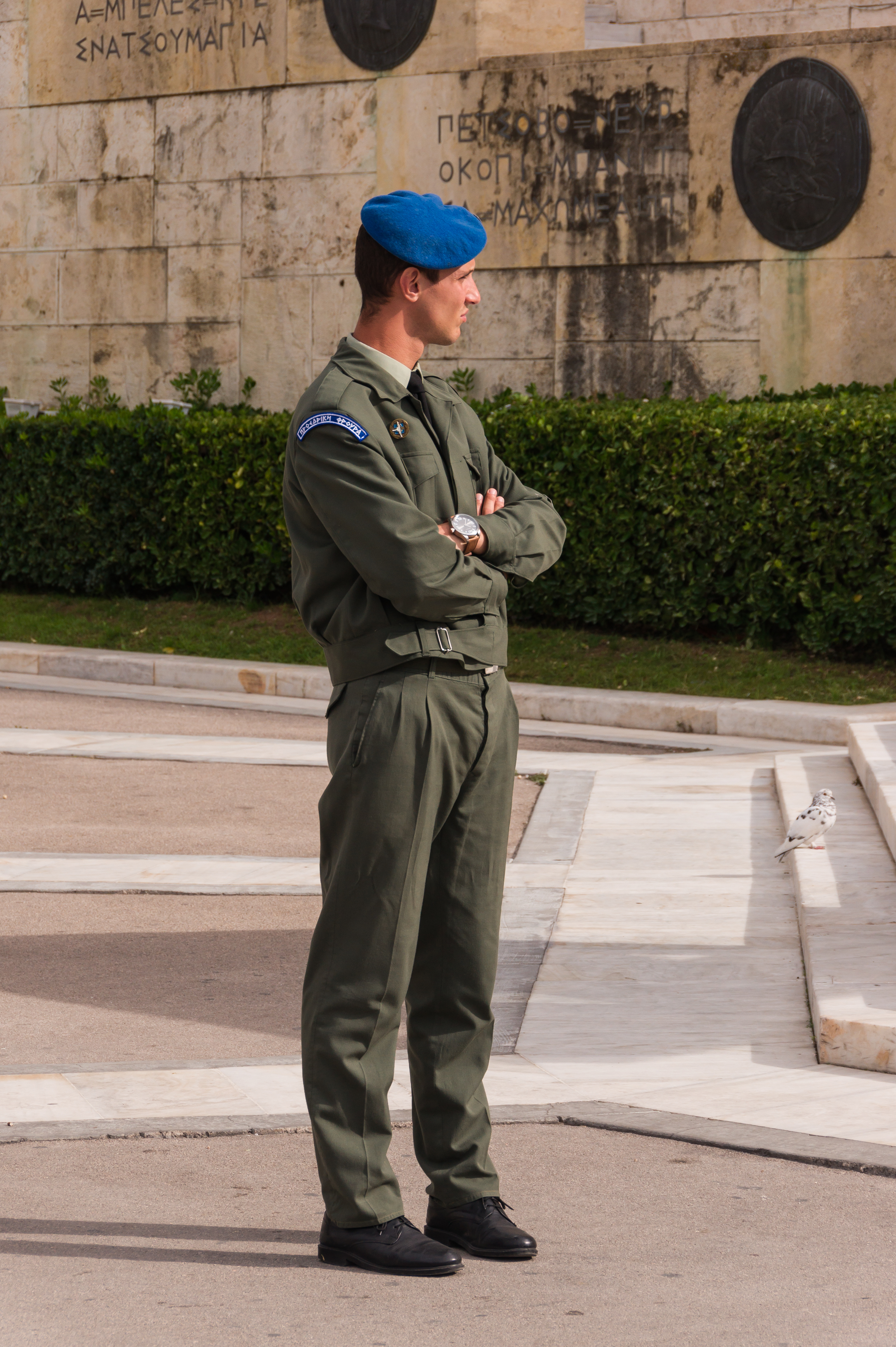
Presidential Guard service uniform

== See also ==
- Royal Phalanx

== Sources ==
- Ἱστορία τῆς Βασιλικῆς Φρουρᾶς (Φρουρά Σημαῖας, Φρουρά Ἀγνώστου Στρατιώτου, Ἀνακτορική Φρουρά) για τὴν περίοδο ἀπὸ 12/12/1868 ἔως 01/09/1946 [History of the Royal Guard (Flag Guard, Guard of the Unknown Soldier, Palace Guard) for the period from 12/12/1868 to 01/09/1946] (in Greek), Hellenic Army General Staff, Army History Directorate
- Presidential Guard, 3rd Staff Bureau (2 January 1991), Συνοπτική Ιστορία της Προεδρικής Φρουράς [Concise History of the Presidential Guard] (in Greek), Hellenic Army General Staff, Army History Directorate
- Hellenic Army General Staff, Training Directorate/3a (March 1995). Ιστορία Ιππικού - Τεθωρακισμένων [History of the Cavalry–Armour Arm]. Athens: Hellenic Army Printing Office.
- Mylonas, Yiannis (1998). Οι Εύζωνοι (in Greek). Athens: Ioannis Floros. ISBN 960-7178-39-4.
