= Battle of Hill 1378 =

Battle of the Second Balkan War in July 1913

- Part of the Battle of Kresna Gorge and the Second Balkan War
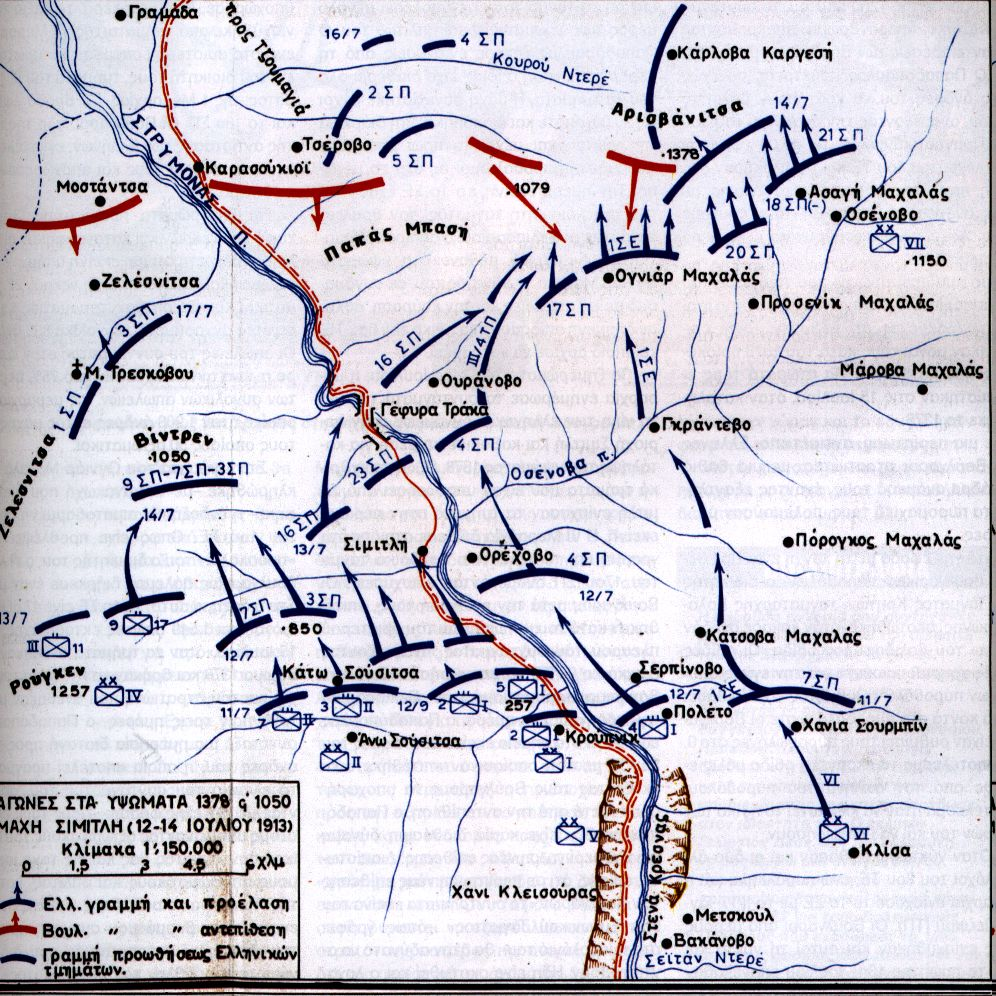
- Greek military map showing the operations around Simitli, Ognar Mahala and Hills 1079 and 1378.
Date	25–28 July 1913 (Note: All dates in this article follow the Gregorian calendar (New Style). Older sources used the Julian calendar (Old Style), 13 days behind in 1913. In that calendar, the fighting took place on 12–15 July (O.S.))
Location	Hill 1378, near Tserovo, southern Rila Mountains, Bulgaria
Result	Greek victory: Capture of Hill 1378

Belligerents
Kingdom of Greece	Kingdom of Bulgaria

Commanders and leaders
Dionysios Papadopoulos; Ioannis Velissariou †; Georgios Kolokotronis †	Vasil Delov

Units involved
1/38 Evzone Regiment; 8th Evzone Battalion; 9th Evzone Battalion; Cretan Battalion; VII Infantry Division	Bulgarian Second Army; 3rd Balkan Infantry Division; 2nd Infantry Brigade; 3rd Infantry Brigade; 1st Sofia Infantry Regiment; Bulgarian Royal Guard Regiment

Strength
c. 1,000	c. 12,000 (Note: Two Bulgarian brigades took part in the battle. Clyde Sinclair Ford estimated Bulgarian Second Army brigades at approximately 6,000 men each, giving an estimated combined strength of 12,000.)

Casualties and losses
859–925 killed or wounded	Extremely heavy

The Battle of Hill 1378 (Greek: Μάχη του Υψώματος 1378) was fought between the Greek and Bulgarian armies on 25–28 July 1913 during the closing stages of the Second Balkan War. It took place around a fortified height northeast of Simitli and northwest of Razlog, in the southern foothills of the Rila Mountains, as the Greek army reached the outskirts of Gorna Dzhumaya (present-day Blagoevgrad).

The battle involved repeated attacks and counterattacks for control of the summit. The Greek 1/38 Evzone Regiment suffered severe losses, including the death of Major Ioannis Velissariou, but the summit was finally taken by 28 July and retained until the armistice three days later.

The battle is considered the bloodiest battle fought by the Greek Army during both Balkan Wars, in terms of proportion of casualties sustained by the units engaged, which reached approximately 90%.

== Background ==
Following the Greek victories at Kilkis–Lachanas and Doiran, the Greek army pursued the retreating Bulgarian forces into the Struma valley. In mid-July it moved through the Kresna Gorge, where steep mountains, damaged roads and Bulgarian artillery complicated its advance. The Bulgarian defenders withdrew to a series of positions guarding the approaches to Gorna Dzhumaya (Blagoevgrad), including the heights around Ognar Mahala.

Hill 1378 dominated part of the eastern approach to the town. The 1/38 Evzone Regiment, commanded by Colonel Dionysios Papadopoulos, comprised the 8th Evzone Battalion under Major Vasilounis, the 9th Evzone Battalion under Major Velissariou, and a battalion of Cretan soldiers commanded by Major Georgios Kolokotronis. Among the Bulgarians, there were the Bulgarian Royal Guard Regiment, the Bulgarian 1st and 9th Infantry Regiments under General Vasil Delov.

== Battle ==
=== Fighting at Ognar Mahala, 25 July ===
Fighting began on 25 July around the settlement of Ognar Mahala. Papadopoulos reported that Bulgarian troops, reinforced by machine guns, had attacked his forward battalions with bayonets. The Greek regiment counterattacked and held its ground, but came under heavy artillery fire. In a report sent to the VI Division at 9:40 p.m., Papadopoulos estimated approximately 80 killed and wounded, reported the death of Major Georgios Kolokotronis and requested ammunition, artillery support and reinforcements from the 17th Infantry Regiment. Although the Greeks secured the positions around Ognar Mahala, nightfall prevented them from taking Hill 1378.

=== Assaults on Hill 1378, 26–27 July ===
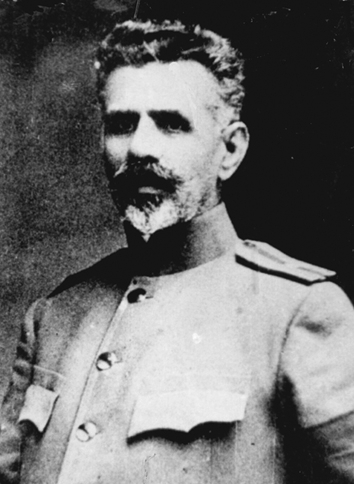
Major Ioannis Velissariou, commander of the 9th Evzone Battalion, who was killed on 26 July 1913.

The struggle for the summit intensified on 26 July. Bulgarian artillery and infantry fire struck the Greek troops as they attempted to move uphill. The 1/38 Regiment launched repeated assaults, several of which reached the summit before Bulgarian counterattacks forced the attackers back, with the height changing hands six times during the fighting, being captured and lost three times by the Greeks. Some of the fighting was at close quarters, with bayonets. In addition, some soldiers, having exhausted their cartridges, fought with stones.

Major Velissariou was killed on 26 July while leading the 9th Evzone Battalion. A later account by retired officer Christos Bouklas reproduces recollections attributed to the battalion physician, Boukouras, who witnessed the conditions on the battlefield and Velissariou's final hours. Captain Manolidis, who took over command of the battalion, was also killed during the fighting.

On 27 July, General Delov attacked Hill 1378 with the Bulgarian 1st and 9th Infantry Regiments and drove off a Greek advance guard. The Bulgarians then attacked the Greek VI Division around Ognar Mahala, but the arrival of the VII Division from Predel Han via Osenovo helped the Greeks mount a final decisive counterattack, which conclusively recaptured the summit.

=== Capture of the summit, 28 July ===
By the morning of 28 July, the 1/38 Evzone Regiment decisively held Hill 1378, following its capture during the preceding night, while Bulgarian troops withdrew towards Gorna Dzhumaya.

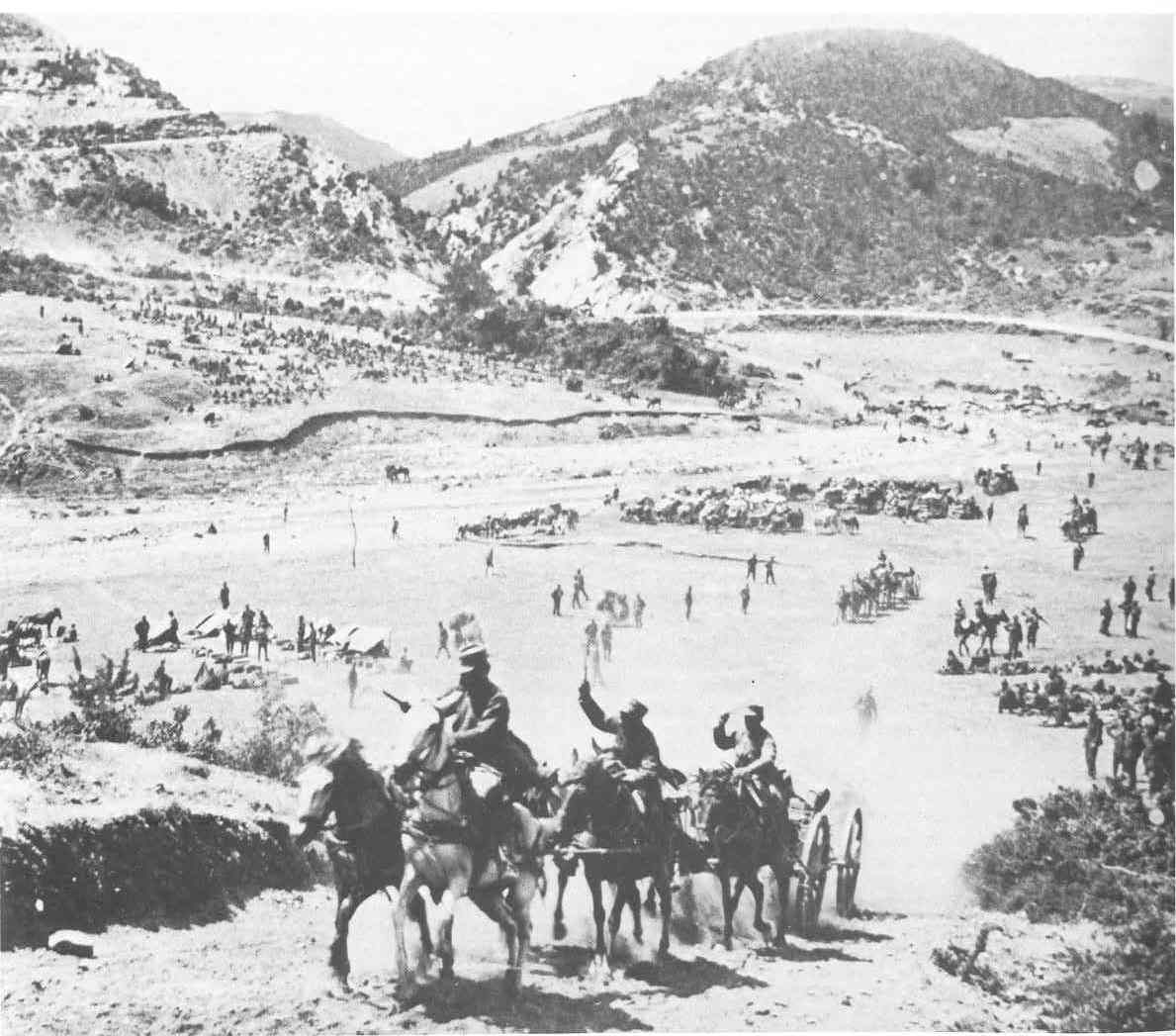
Greek horse-drawn artillery advancing through the Kresna Gorge in July 1913.

== Casualties ==
The Hellenic National Defence General Staff gives 859 casualties for the 1/38 Evzone Regiment during the fighting for Hill 1378. It states that only six officers remained fit for duty in the regiment, including Papadopoulos, and gives one lieutenant and 79 Evzones as the remaining men of the 9th Battalion. Retired officer Christos Bouklas writes that there were 275 survivors from approximately 1,000 men, about 200 of whom were wounded. Bulgarian losses were also extremely heavy.

== Aftermath ==
The 1/38 Evzone Regiment retained Hill 1378 until the armistice on 31 July, despite further Bulgarian efforts to recover the position. The Greek Army, at its greatest extent, reached the village of Tserovo, only 7 km outside of the city of Blagoevgrad and approximately 75–85 km south of Sofia.

The battle became particularly associated in Greece with the death of Velissariou. King Constantine I personally sent a condolence letter to the Velissariou's family, calling him "the hero of heroes" (Greek: «Χαιρετίζω τον ήρωα των ηρώων»).

Following the armistice, Greek troops withdrew from Hill 1378 on 14 August 1913. In a letter dated 16 August, soldier Georgios Kandiloros described how the withdrawing soldiers left behind the graves of numerous officers and men killed during the fighting. The graves were marked by simple wooden crosses bearing the names of the dead. Kandiloros also expressed concern that the Bulgarians, who were expected to reoccupy the area, might destroy or remove the crosses.

== Legacy ==
The remains of the Greek soldiers who died in the battle are believed to still be buried in Bulgaria, despite longstanding efforts by the Greek government to secure their exhumation and repatriation. In 2021 and 2023, the Greek Ministry of Foreign Affairs confirmed that the matter remained under discussion with the Bulgarian authorities.

The issue resurfaced in October 2026, following an agreement between Greece and Bulgaria regarding the transfer to Bulgaria of the remains attributed to Tsar Samuel, as some Greek parliamentarians questioned why the remains of Velissariou, Kolokotronis and other Greek soldiers killed in Bulgaria in 1913 had not similarly been repatriated.
