= Dionysios Papadopoulos =

- Διονύσιος Παπαδόπουλος
- Born: 1 July 1858; Vromovrysi, Kingdom of Greece
- Died: 6 February 1922 (aged 63); Athens, Kingdom of Greece
- Military career
- Allegiance: Kingdom of Greece
- Branch: Hellenic Army
- Service years: 1880–1921
- Rank: Lieutenant general
- Commands: 9th Evzone Battalion; 1/38 Evzone Regiment; 3rd Infantry Regiment
- Conflicts: Greco-Turkish War (1897); Balkan Wars; First Balkan War; Battle of Sarantaporo; Battle of Yenidje; Battle of Bizani; Second Balkan War; Battle of Kilkis–Lachanas; Battle of Kresna Gorge; Battle of Hill 1378

Dionysios Papadopoulos (Greek: Διονύσιος Παπαδόπουλος) was a Greek soldier who rose to the rank of lieutenant general.

== Life ==
Dionysios Papadopoulos was born in the village of Vromovrysi in Messenia on 1 July 1858. He enlisted in the Hellenic Army on 29 September 1888 as an infantry private, entered the officer academy, and was commissioned as an infantry second lieutenant on 22 September 1885.

He fought in the Greco-Turkish War of 1897. He distinguished himself particularly in the Balkan Wars of 1912–13. During the First Balkan War he led the 9th Evzone Battalion in the battles of Sarantaporo, Yenidje. He then commanded the newly formed 1st Evzone Regiment, comprising the 8th and 9th Evzone Battalions, in the capture of Florina and Korytsa, and the Battle of Bizani and the capture of Ioannina. In the Second Balkan War, he led the regiment in the battles of Lachanas, Vetrina, and Demir Hisar, and finally in the bloody Battle of Kresna, where the 1st Evzone Regiment played a critical part in repelling the Bulgarian attacks against Height 1378, suffering enormous losses especially among officers. As a result, Papadopoulos was forced to alternately fulfill the roles of regimental, battalion, company, and even platoon commander.

He was promoted to colonel for bravery after the war's end, and posted as commander of the 3rd Infantry Regiment at Chalkis. He was promoted to major general and lieutenant general in 1917, commanded a division, and retired on 11 February 1921.

He died in Athens on 6 February 1922.
