= Ioannis Velissariou =

Greek Hellenic Army officer and war hero

Major Ioannis Velissariou
- Ιωάννης Βελισσαρίου
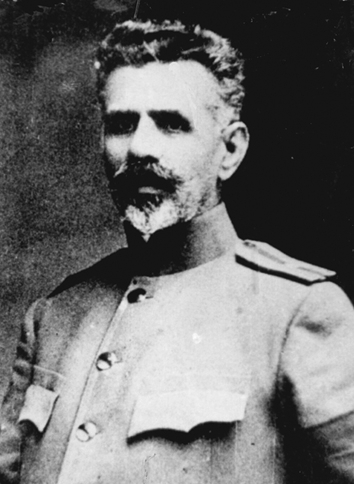
- Velissariou in uniform.
- Born: 26 November 1861; Ploiești, United Principalities of Moldavia and Wallachia (now Romania)
- Died: 13 July 1913; Gradevo, Tsardom of Bulgaria
- Cause of death: Killed in action
- Burial place: Summit 1378, near Gradevo, Bulgaria
- Military career
- Allegiance: Kingdom of Greece
- Branch: Hellenic Army
- Service years: 1887–1913
- Rank: Major
- Nicknames: Hero of the Heroes; Ήρωας των Ηρώων; Black Rider; Μαύρος Καβαλάρης
- Commands: 4th Infantry Regiment: 3rd Battalion; 1/38 Evzone Regiment: 9th Battalion
- Conflicts: Greco-Turkish War (1897); Balkan Wars; First Balkan War; Battle of Sarantaporo; Battle of Yenidje; Battle of Bizani; Second Balkan War; Battle of Kilkis-Lachanas; Battle of Kresna Gorge; Battle of Hill 1378 †
- Awards: Order of the Redeemer

Ioannis Velissariou (Greek: Ιωάννης Βελισσαρίου, 26 November 1861 – 13 July 1913) was a Hellenic Army officer and hero of the Balkan Wars. He is considered to be one of the most important figures in the military history of modern Greece. He had a decisive role in the Battle of Bizani during the First Balkan War (1912–1913), forcing the Ottoman Army to surrender unconditionally.

== Early life and career ==
Velissariou was born in Ploiești, United Principalities of Moldavia and Wallachia, to Greek parents from Evia. He spent much of his boyhood in Ploiești. At the age of 19 he joined the Hellenic Army as a volunteer, while in 1887 he was promoted to Infantry Second Lieutenant. He acquired his first combat experience during the Greco-Turkish War of 1897, where he distinguished himself at the battles of Melouna and Derven-Fourkas, covering the Greek positions. In the following years he was posted as gendarmerie commander in the island of Skopelos and in 1909 he participated in the Goudi military coup.

== Balkan Wars ==
First Balkan War

With the outbreak of the Balkan Wars, Velissariou was appointed commander in the 3rd Battalion of the 4th Infantry Regiment. At the Battle of Sarantaporo he managed to advance rapidly with his unit against the Ottoman forces and cut their withdrawal, causing general unrest to the enemy.

After Sarantaporo he was placed as commander in the 9th Battalion of the 1st Evzone Regiment. Velissariou then was transferred to the Epirus front and was deployed at the east flank, in the Aetorachi sector. On February 19, 1913, the Greek headquarters ordered a general attack against the Ottoman fortifications in Bizani, which covered the city of Ioannina. The Evzone battalions of Velissariou and Georgios Iatridis penetrated rapidly north and managed to cut off the only escape route of the enemy troops with the capture of the village of Agios Ioannis, between Bizani and Ioannina. Soon the Ottoman headquarters in Ioannina, was unable to transmit any communication message to the Ottoman forts, causing major panic. In the following night, the units of Velissariou and Iatridis managed to capture 37 officers and 935 soldiers in their attempt to withdraw north. As a result, the next day, the Ottoman commander Esad Pasha surrendered, while Velissariou personally led the Ottoman delegation to the Greek headquarters.

Second Balkan War

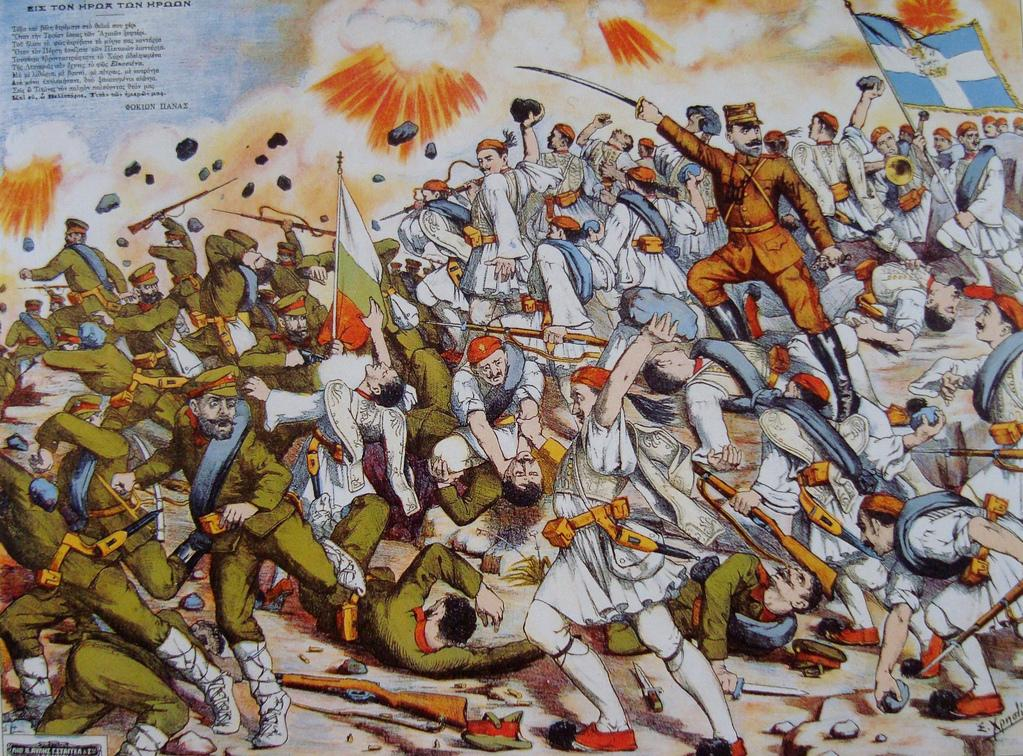
Painting depicting the battle of Summit 1378, with Velissariou pictured right, among the Evzones.

Velissariou participated in the Second Balkan War against Greece's erstwhile ally Bulgaria, initially in the Battle of Lachanas and then in the Battle of Kresna Gorge. After the Hellenic Army managed to break through the Kresna pass, it captured the town of Simitli, while the battalion of Velissariou, together with two other battalions of the 1st Evzone Regiment, fought at Summit 1378, 20 kilometres (12 mi) northeast of Simitli. Although the sector suffered constant attacks by the Bulgarian Army, the Evzones managed to repel them. During the time of 13–15 July, in the Battle of Hill 1378, the Regiment suffered numerous casualties; Major Velissariou was one of the officers killed.

He was buried near the battle site.

== Sources ==
- Gedeon, Dimitrios (1998). A concise history of the Balkan Wars, 1912–1913 (1.udg. ed.). Athens: Hellenic Army General Staff, Army History Directorate. ISBN 9789607897077.
