= 1/38 National Guard Command =

1/38 National Guard Command 1/38 Διοίκηση Ταγμάτων Εθνοφυλακής
- Active: 1912–1929; 1975–present
- Country: Greece
- Branch: Hellenic Army
- Type: National Guard
- Size: Regiment
- Part of: 95th National Guard Higher Command
- Garrison/HQ: Rhodes, Dodecanese
- Engagements: Balkan Wars; First Balkan War; Battle of Sarantaporo; Battle of Yenidje; Battle of Bizani; Second Balkan War; Battle of Kilkis-Lachanas; Battle of Kresna Gorge; Battle of Hill 1378; World War I; Macedonian front; Greco-Turkish War (1919–1922); Greek landing at Smyrna; Greek Retreat
- Battle honours: Commander's Cross if the Cross of Valour

Commanders
- Notable commanders: Dionysios Papadopoulos

The 1/38 National Guard Command "Bizani" (Greek: 1/38 Διοίκηση Ταγμάτων Εθνοφυλακής «ΜΠΙΖΑΝΙ», 1/38 ΔΤΕ) is an infantry unit of the Hellenic Army, based in Rhodes island as part of the 95th National Guard Higher Command. It carries on the traditions of the elite 1/38 Evzone Regiment (1/38 Σύνταγμα Ευζώνων, 1/38 ΣΕ).

== History ==
The 1/38 Evzone Regiment was formed in Karditsa, Thessaly, as the 1st Evzone Regiment (1° Σύνταγμα Ευζώνων) shortly before the outbreak of the Balkan Wars, from the 8th and 9th independent Evzone battalions. It participated in the Balkan Wars, initially as part of the 6th Infantry Division, fighting in the battles of Sarantaporos, Giannitsa, Bizani (where it played a distinguished role under Major Ioannis Velissariou), Kilkis–Lachanas and Kresna–Djumaya (especially in the Battle of Hill 1378, where the regiment lost almost half its strength and all three of its battalion commanders).

After the Balkan Wars, the regiment was based in Larissa. In May 1917, during the National Schism, the French Army, in support of the Venizelist Provisional Government of National Defence at Thessaloniki, entered Thessaly and ordered the disarmament of the Greek military units in the region, still loyal to the royal government in Athens. The regiment refused to obey the command to surrender its weapons, and retreated west towards the mountains. The French launched a pursuit of the unit, encircling it and forcing it to surrender. The unit was disbanded and most of its officers were imprisoned until August, when, after the exile of King Constantine I and the assumption of the government by Venizelos, Greece formally entered World War I on the side of the Entente.

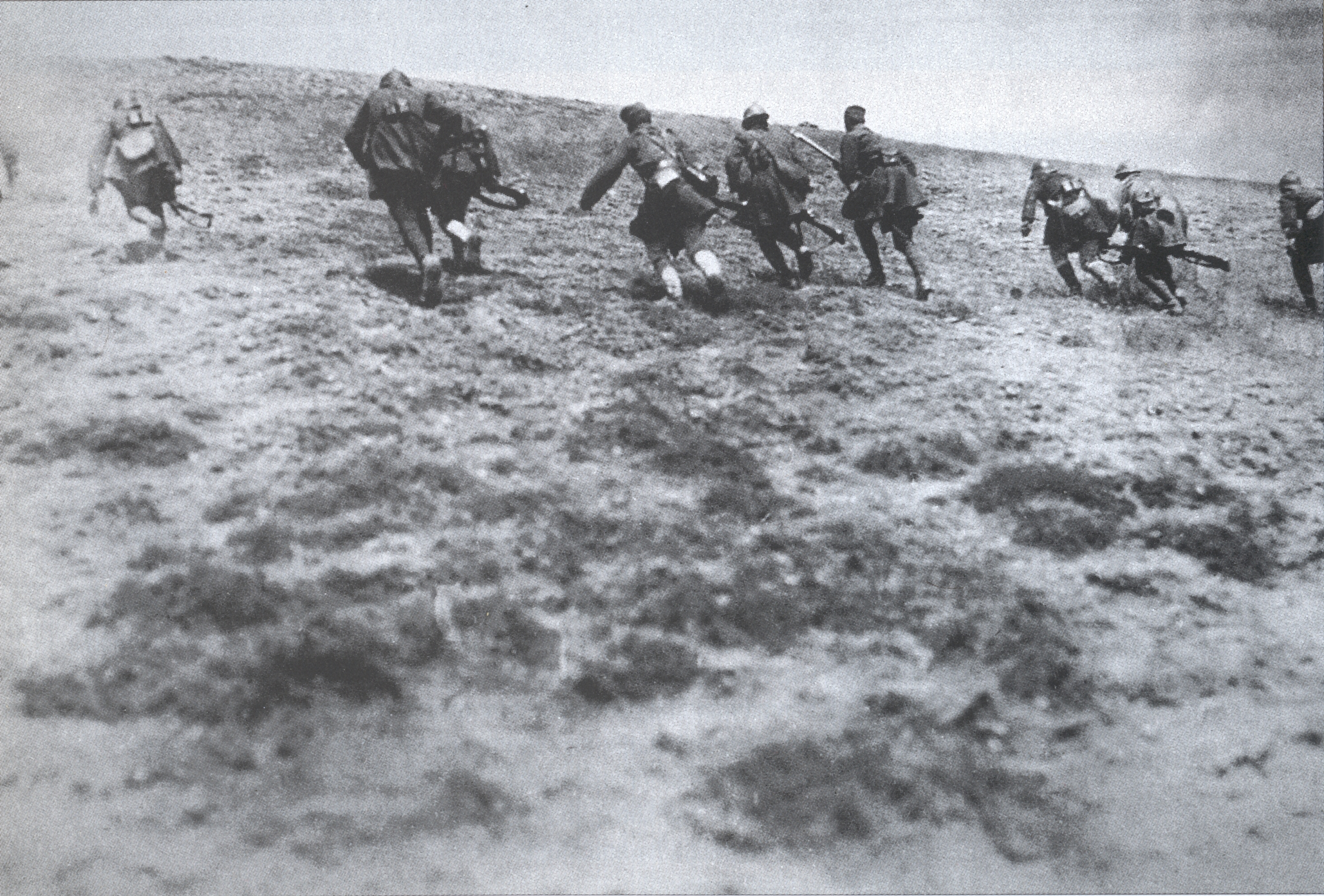
Evzones of the 1/38 attack in Asia Minor, August 1921.

The 1/38 Regiment was re-formed at Larissa as part of the 1st Infantry Division, and participated in the Macedonian front operations in 1918, recapturing the city of Serres. The regiment subsequently fought in the Asia Minor Campaign from the Greek landing at Smyrna on 2 May 1919 until its final retreat from Asia Minor on 1 September 1922. On 10 November 1921, the regiment was awarded the highest Greek military distinction, the Commander's Cross of the Cross of Valour, for its performance in the field. After its return from Asia Minor, the regiment demobilized and returned to its peacetime garrison at Larissa. It remained there, under the 1st Infantry Division, until the Army reorganization of 1929, when it was disbanded.

In December 1975, the 121st Special Covering Regiment (121 ΕΣΠ) at Ano Kalamonas in Rhodes, was renamed into the 38th Hellenic Gendarmerie Command (38η Διοίκηση Ταγμάτων Ελληνικής Χωροφυλακής, 38 ΔΤΕΧ), reviving the traditions of the 1/38. This connection was further emphasized in September 2000, when the unit received its current name, 1/38 National Guard Command "Bizani" (1/38 Διοίκηση Ταγμάτων Εθνοφυλακής «ΜΠΙΖΑΝΙ»).

== Order of battle ==
=== Until 2005 ===
- 211 Infantry Battalion (211 ΤΠ)
- 299 Infantry Battalion (299 ΤΠ)
- 548 National Guard Battalion (548 ΤΕ)
- Ano Kalamonas National Guard Battalion
- Tilos Island Defence Command (ΔΑΝ Τήλου), added in 2004

=== Since 2005 ===
- 211 Mechanized National Guard Battalion (211 Μ/Κ ΤΕ)
- 542 Mechanized National Guard Battalion (548 Μ/Κ ΤΕ)
- Ano Kalamonas National Guard Battalion
- Tilos Island Defence Command (ΔΑΝ Τήλου)
