= Tserovo =

Tserovo (Bulgarian: Церово) may refer to the following places in Bulgaria:

- Tserovo, Blagoevgrad Province
- Tserovo, Pazardzhik Province
- Tserovo, Sofia Province
