= Lachanas Military Museum =

- Στρατιωτικό Μουσείο Λαχανά
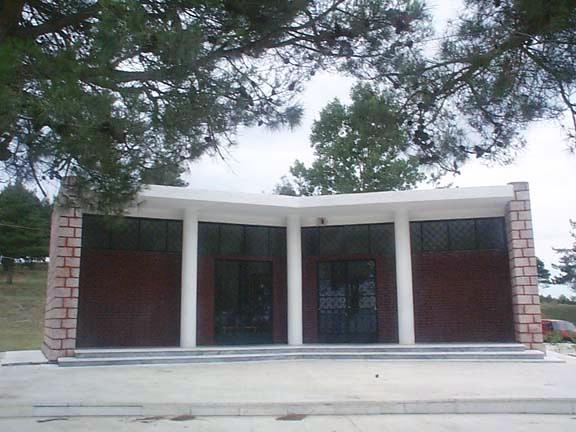
- Exterior view of the museum
- Location: Thessaloniki, Greece
- Coordinates: 40°57′8.9″N 23°12′15.6″E
- Type: Military museum

The Lachanas Military Museum (Greek: Στρατιωτικό Μουσείο Λαχανά) is a military museum near Thessaloniki, Greece, dedicated to the Battle of Kilkis-Lahanas.

The museum, which is visitable by appointment, chiefly contains mementos of the Greek and Bulgarian military units which took part in the battle. In the forecourt, there are three captured Bulgarian cannons, one of 12 cm calibre, one of 10.5 cm calibre, and one muzzle-loader.

Inside there is a large relief map showing the movements of the units and the clashes between the Greek and Bulgarian armies; 8 mm Greek and Bulgarian Mannlichers; submachine guns; machine guns; shells; cannons; bayonets; swords of commanding units; Greek military uniforms (the most important of which is the one worn by Lieutenant-Colonel Papakyriazis, who was killed at the Battle of Lahanas); and two full-length portraits of the Greek protagonists in the Balkan Wars, Prime Minister Eleftherios Venizelos and Crown Prince Constantine. Also of note are four paintings by Kenan Messare, who was the son of the Ottoman commander Hasan Tahsin Pasha, who surrendered Thessaloniki to the Greeks, and followed Constantine on the Epirus campaign and into the Second Balkan War. They depict scenes from the Battle of Lahanas during the Second Balkan War.

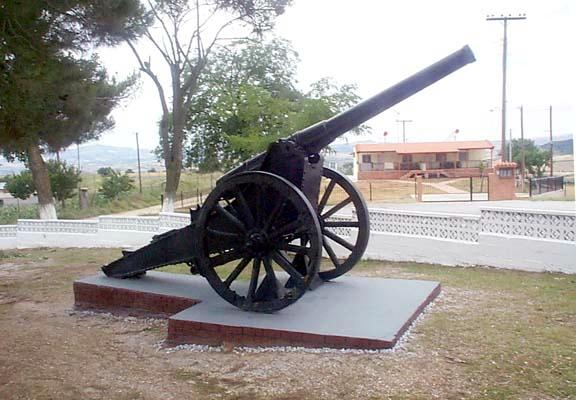
Bulgarian cannon of 12 cm calibre

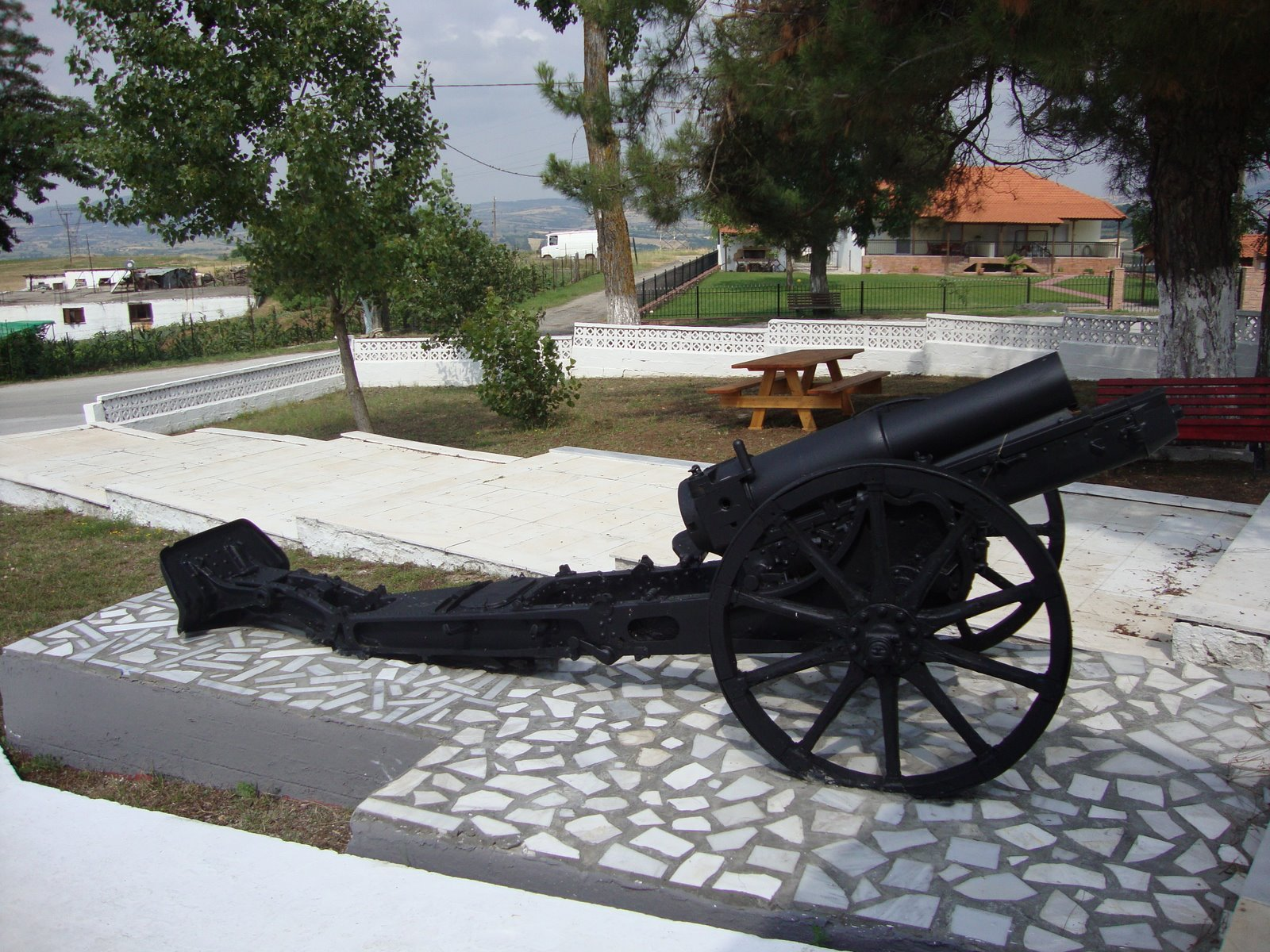
Bulgarian 105 mm mountain howitzer

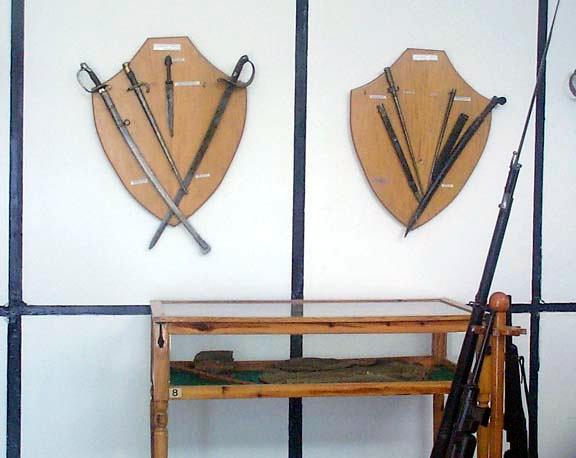
Greek memorabilia

== Sources ==
- This article incorporates text from the corresponding article at the Museums of Macedonia website, commissioned by the Macedonian Heritage foundation, written by Vlasis Vlasidis, and published under a CC-BY-SA-3.0 license.
