= Vasil Delov =

Bulgarian officer and major general

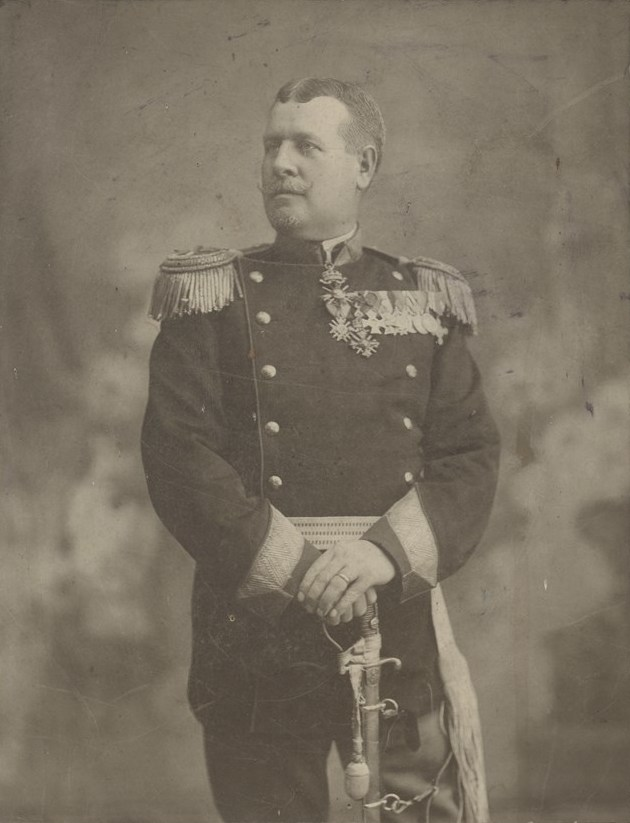
- Born: 25 December 1861; Kotel, Adrianople Vilayet, Ottoman Empire
- Died: 16 November 1938 (aged 76); Plovdiv, Plovdiv Province, Kingdom of Bulgaria
- Military career
- Allegiance: Principality of Bulgaria; Kingdom of Bulgaria
- Branch: Bulgarian Land Forces
- Service years: 1878 – 1919
- Conflicts: Russo-Turkish War (1877–1878); Serbo-Bulgarian War; First Balkan War; Bulgarian front; Battle of Kardzhali; Second Balkan War; Battle of Kresna Gorge; World War I

Vasil Petrov Delov (25 December 1861 – 16 November 1938) was a 20th-century Bulgarian officer and major general.

== Biography ==
Vasil Delov was born on 25 December 1861 in the town of Kotel, Vasil was the child of his father, Petar Hadjinikolov and mother, Teodora Krastevich. The paternal family is from the family of Georgi Rakovski. His mother was the sister of Gavril Krastevich. He received his primary education in his hometown. He graduated from Aprilov High School. Initially he studied in his hometown, and then at the Gabrovo High School until its closure. Then he went to Tulcea to study.

During the Russo-Turkish War (1877-1878) he was in the town of Tulcea. There he prepared to study in Russia under Sava Dobroplodni. He spoke French, German and Russian and was Secretary of the Tulcea Bulgarian Municipality in 1878.

In 1879, he graduated with the first class of the Vasil Levski National Military University in Sofia. Actual military service began in the 20th Infantry Company of Varna in 1879. He is actively involved in the construction of the Bulgarian Land Forces. He published The Ordinary Soldiers in the Infantry, which was the first training manual in the Bulgarian Army. Followed by "Guide for non-commissioned officers in the study of loose formation", "Trenches for infantry with drawings", "Guide for officers in training in fencing", "Table for fighting with a knife with drawings", "On disciplinary sanctions and gymnastics". He was awarded the Order of Merit. Company commander in the Varna company.

During the Serbo-Bulgarian War of 1885 he was commander of the 2nd Company of the 8th Primorski Infantry Regiment. In the Battle of Tsaribrod on 11 and 12 November he commanded the section of Babina Glava Peak. Under heavy enemy fire, occupying the opposite Neshkov Peak, he decided to attack it, despite orders from the High Command to wait for reinforcements. As a result of the attack, the summit was captured and the Serbian army was forced to withdraw to Pirot. He was awarded the Order of Courage IV degree. is serving in the 24th Black Sea Infantry Regiment as a company commander.

After the war he was commander of the 22nd Thracian Infantry Regiment (1892), the 9th Plovdiv Infantry Regiment (1893). Colonel since 1896. Served in the Vidin garrison as commander of the 3rd Bdina Infantry Regiment. Commander of the 1st Brigade of the 6th, and then of the 2nd Brigade of the 2nd Thracian Infantry Division (1901 - 1912).

During the First Balkan War, he was chief of the Haskovo detachment. In the Battle of Kardzhali he drove the Turks south of the Arda River and secured the rear of the 2nd Bulgarian Army near Edirne. He was then appointed commander of the 11th Infantry Combined Division. In March 1913, as head of the Southern Department of the Eastern Sector, he took part in the siege and assault on the Edirne Fortress. He was promoted to the rank of Major General.

At the beginning of the Second Balkan War, he commanded the 11th Infantry Division, and towards the end, in the Battle of Kresna Gorge, he was at the head of the Western Rhodope Detachment. From October 1914 he was dismissed from active service and passed into the reserves on his own.

During World War I, he was Head of Divisional tenth Aegean Region, General Orders in the War Department and Head of the 2nd divisional area (1918). He resigned in 1919. He settled with his family in Plovdiv.

Writing his memoirs in 1936, Delov noted:

during the Balkan War of 1912/1913 and during the European War, during the occupation of Macedonia by our troops, Macedonia had to declare itself autonomy and no one could oppose it. In 1913, our declaration of the Allied War at the suggestion of Austria in order to disintegrate the Balkan Union was a great mistake, because against us declared: Turkey, which occupied Thrace and Edirne, Romania, Serbia, Greece and Montenegro.

— Vasil Delov

Major General Vasil Delov died in Plovdiv on 16 November 1938. A bust of him was erected in the town of Kardzhali.

== Awards ==
- Order of Bravery, III and IV degree, 2nd class
- Order of Saint Alexander, III degree with swords, IV and V degree
- Order of Military Merit, III and IV degree
- Order of Merit
- Stara Planina, I degree with swords, posthumously

== Bibliography ==
- Rumenin, Rumen. The Officer Corps in Bulgaria 1878 - 1944. Vol. 1 and 2. Sofia, Publishing House of the Ministry of Defense "St. George the Victorious ", 1996. p. 235.
- Nedev, S., The Command of the Bulgarian Army during the Wars of National Unification, Sofia, 1993, Military Publishing Complex "St. George the Victorious ", p. 95
- Army Headquarters - Military History Commission (1925). History of the Serbo-Bulgarian War of 1885. Sofia: State Printing House.
