= Kilkis War Museum =

Museum in Kilkis, Greece

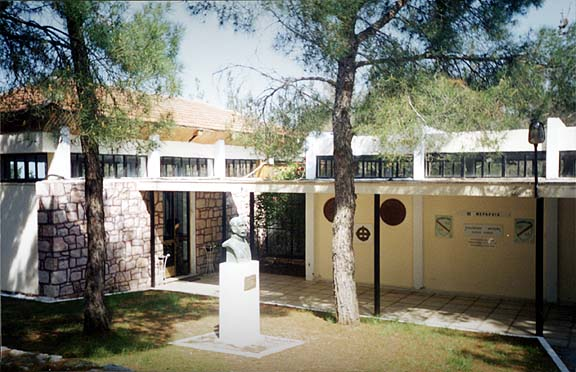
External view

The Kilkis War Museum stands outside the town of the city of Kilkis in Central Macedonia, Greece.

The museum was built in 1966, next to the war memorial built in 1927 on the Iroön Hill, the work of a sculptor named Dimitriadis from Athens. The memorial was erected to commemorate those who fell in the bloody Battle of Kilkis–Lachanas on 21 June 1913, which proved decisive for Greece's victory in the Second Balkan War. The museum was expanded in 1971, and belongs to the Ministry of National Defence, which is also responsible for running it.

In its two rooms, visitors may see memorabilia of the 1912-13 Balkan Wars including personal artifacts of the officers who fought in the battle, military uniforms, weapons, and regimental colours. There is also a relief map and audiovisual presentation of the battle.

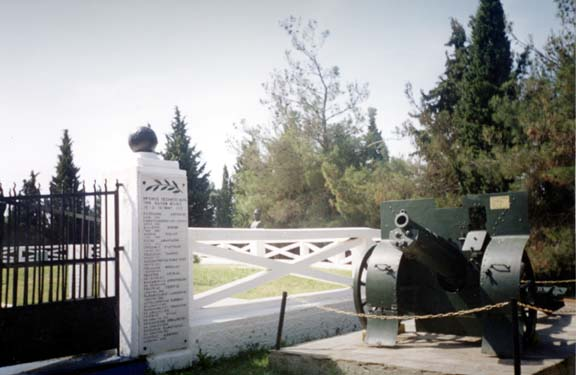
Artillery of the Balkan wars

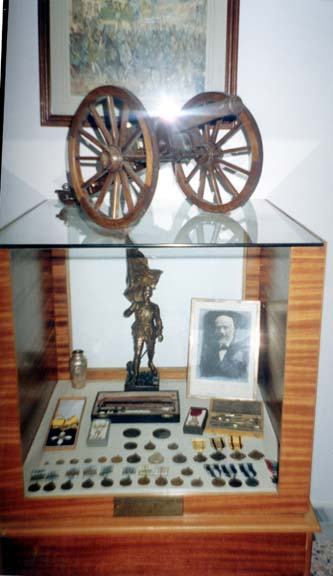
Memorabilia of the Balkan Wars

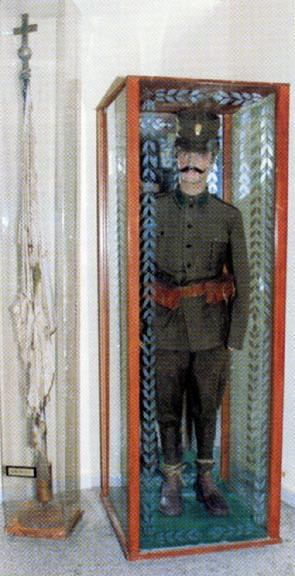
Military uniform

== Sources ==
- This article incorporates text from the corresponding article at the Museums of Macedonia website, commissioned by the Macedonian Heritage foundation, written by Vlasis Vlasidis, and published under a CC-BY-SA-3.0 license.
