= 10.5 cm Gebirgshaubitze L/12 =

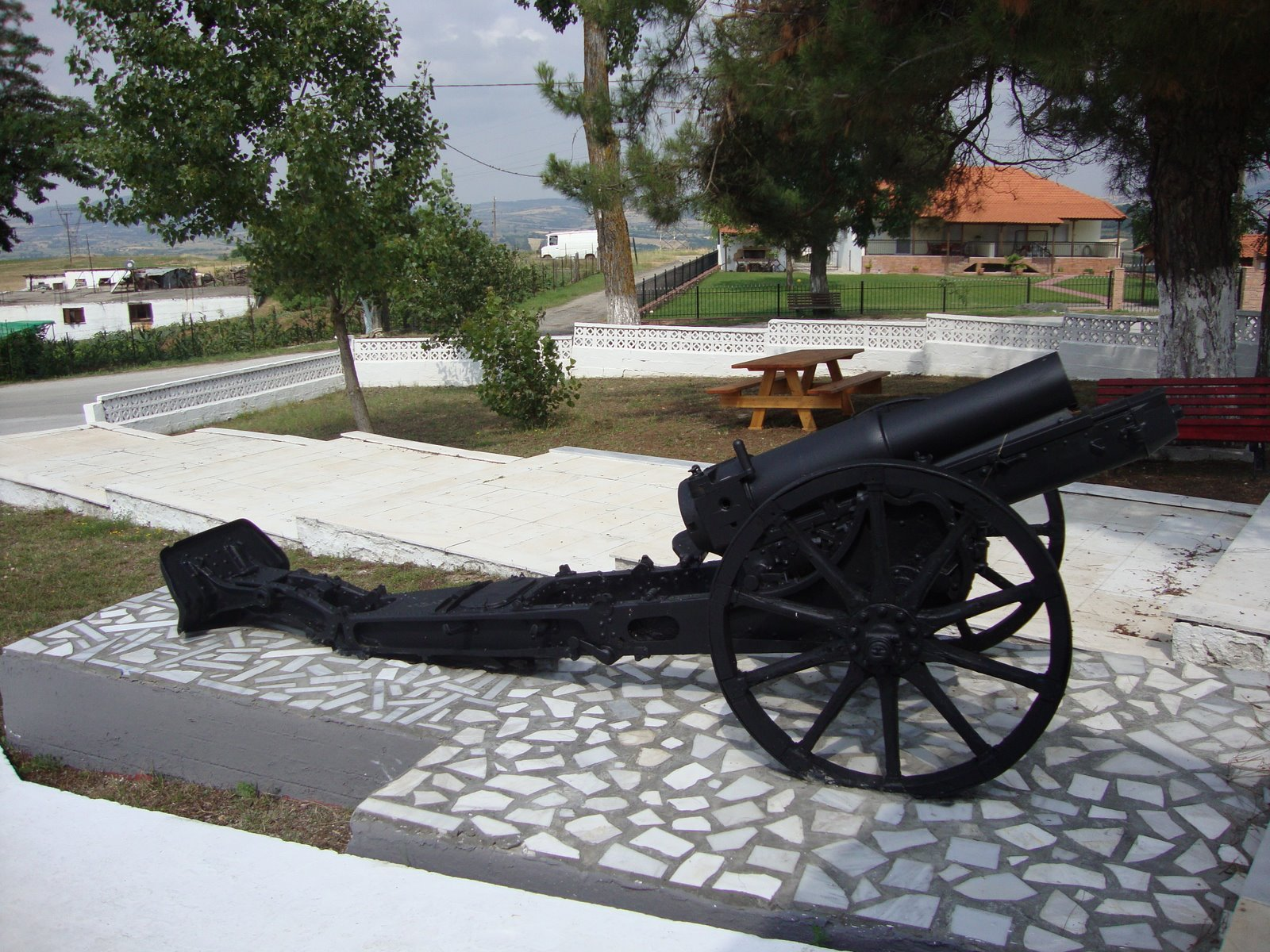
- A Bulgarian 10.5 cm Gebirgshaubitze L/12, at the Lachanas Military Museum, Central Macedonia, Greece.
- Type: Mountain gun
- Place of origin: German Empire

Service history
- Used by: German Empire; Kingdom of Bulgaria; Ottoman Empire
- Wars: World War I

Production history
- Designer: Krupp
- Manufacturer: Krupp

Specifications
- Mass: Firing: 815 kg (1,797 lb); Travel: 1,215 kg (2,679 lb)
- Barrel length: 1.27 m (4 ft 2 in) L/12
- Height: .9 m (2 ft 11 in)
- Shell: Separate loading cased charge and projectile
- Shell weight: 15.8 kg (35 lb)
- Caliber: 105 mm (4.1 in)
- Breech: Horizontal sliding-wedge
- Recoil: Hydro-pneumatic
- Carriage: Box trail
- Elevation: -7° to +40°
- Traverse: 6°
- Rate of fire: 2 rpm
- Muzzle velocity: 256 m/s (840 ft/s)
- Maximum firing range: 5.2 km (3.2 mi)

The 10.5 cm Gebirgshaubitze L/12 was a mountain howitzer used by Germany, Bulgaria, and the Ottoman Empire during World War I.

== History ==
The majority of military planners before the First World War were wedded to the concept of fighting an offensive war of rapid maneuver and in a time before mechanization meant a focus on cavalry and light horse artillery firing shrapnel shells. Although the majority of combatants had heavy field artillery before the outbreak of the First World War, none had adequate numbers of heavy guns in service, nor had they foreseen the growing importance of heavy artillery once the Western Front stagnated and trench warfare set in. The theorists hadn't foreseen that trenches, barbed wire, and machine guns had robbed them of mobility and the need for portable high-angle heavy artillery that could drop a large diameter high explosive shell into enemy trenches and fortifications began to assert itself.

To provide their infantry with portable firepower the combatants experimented with using mortars and mountain guns as infantry support weapons. The ability of mountain guns to be broken down into multiple loads partially overcame the inability of field guns to move across the shell-pocked no man's land between trench lines but their light multi-piece construction meant that when assembled they were often too fragile to be towed across rough terrain. Mortars were often more portable and could deliver high-angle indirect fire but mountain guns could provide both low-angle direct fire and indirect fire.

== Design ==
The 10.5 cm Gebirgshaubitze L/12 was a breech-loaded howitzer made of steel with a Krupp horizontal sliding-wedge breech and used separate loading quick-fire ammunition. The projectile was loaded first and followed by up to six bagged charges that were placed in a brass cartridge case. It could use the same cartridge case and projectiles as the 10.5 cm Feldhaubitze 98/09 but with fewer propellant charges. It had a box trail carriage, gun shield, two wooden-spoked steel-rimmed wheels, and a hydro-pneumatic recoil mechanism. For transport, the gun could be dismantled into eight mule loads or hooked to a limber and caisson for towing by a horse team when assembled.

== World War I ==
Beginning in 1916, Krupp delivered 4 test howitzers to the German Army and after testing another 32 were delivered beginning in June 1916. In service, they were judged to be inferior to Škoda mountain guns so they were discarded and a number were supplied to Turkey, and Bulgaria (16 copies).
