= Battle of Bizani =

1913 battle between Greek and Ottoman forces during the First Balkan War

- Part of the First Balkan War
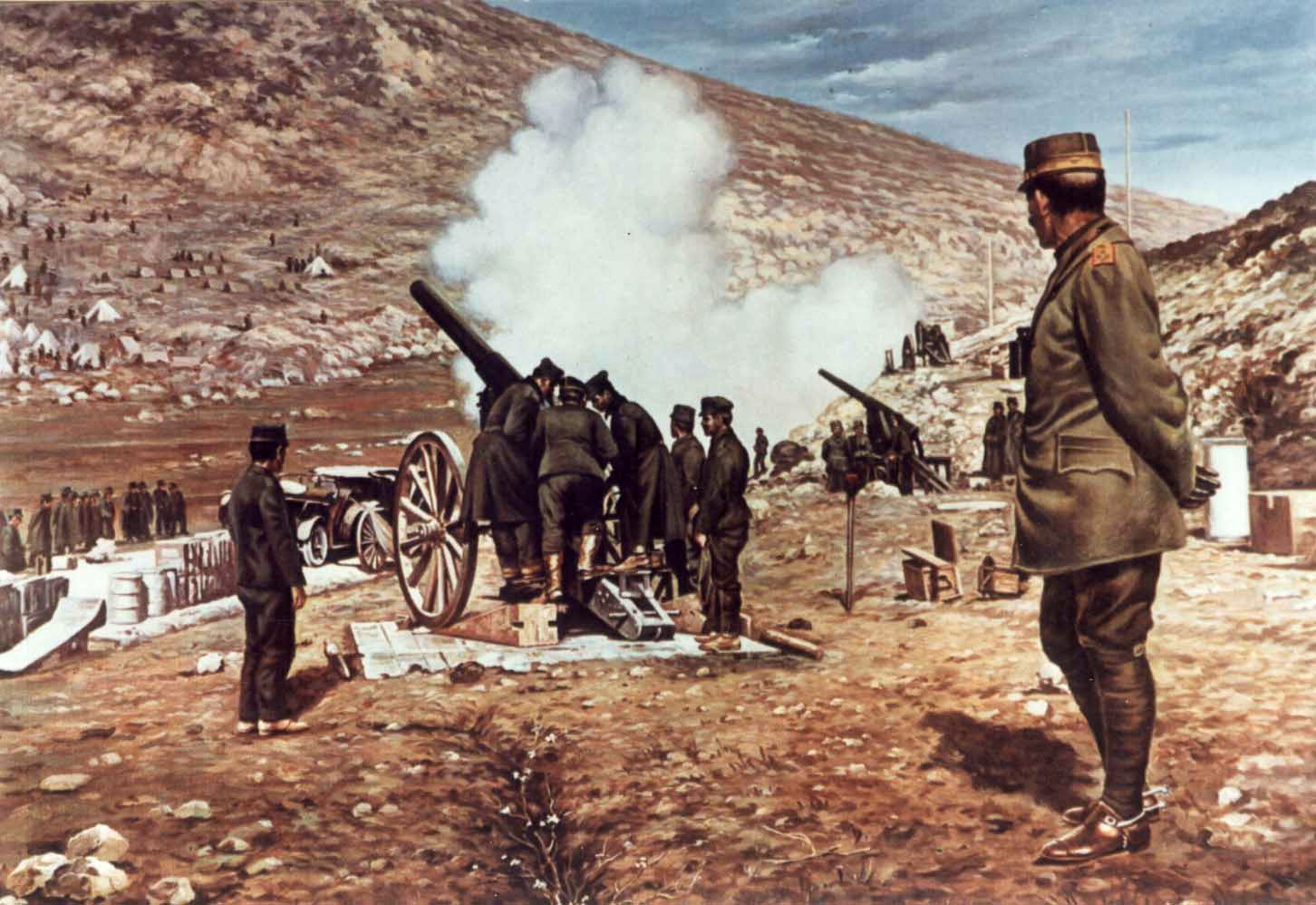
- Crown Prince Constantine watching the heavy guns shelling Bizani, by Georges Scott.
Date	4–6 March [O.S. 19–21 February] 1913
Location	Bizani, Janina Vilayet, Ottoman Empire (now Greece) 39°33′58″N 20°53′33″E
Result	Greek victory; Capture of Ioannina; End of First Balkan War

Belligerents
Greece	Ottoman Empire

Commanders and leaders
(Greece) Crown Prince Constantine (Greece) Konstantinos Sapountzakis (Greece) Dimitrios Matthaiopoulos (WIA)	Esad Pasha (POW); Wehib Pasha (POW)

Units involved
Army of Epirus	Yanya Corps

Strength
4 infantry divisions 41,000 soldiers 1 cavalry brigade 1 cavalry regiment 105 guns	4 infantry divisions 35,000 soldiers Unknown number of irregulars 162 guns

Casualties and losses
500 killed and wounded	11,400 casualties; 2,800 killed; 8,600 captured; 108 guns captured (Note: At 23:00 hours...delirium of enthusiasm.)

The Battle of Bizani (Greek: Μάχη του Μπιζανίου, Máchi tou Bizaníou; Turkish: Bizani Muharebesi) took place in Epirus on 4–6 March [O.S. 19–21 February] 1913. The battle was fought between Greek and Ottoman forces during the last stages of the First Balkan War, and revolved around the forts of Bizani, which covered the approaches to Ioannina, the largest city in the region.

At the outbreak of the war, the Hellenic Army on the Epirus front did not have the numbers to initiate an offensive against the German-designed defensive positions in Bizani. However, after the campaign in Macedonia was over, many Greek troops were redeployed to Epirus, where Crown Prince Constantine himself assumed command. In the battle that followed the Ottoman positions were breached and Ioannina taken. Despite having a slight numerical advantage, this was not the decisive factor in the Greek victory. Rather, "solid operational planning" by the Greeks was key as it helped them implement a well-coordinated and executed assault that did not allow the Ottoman forces time to react. Furthermore, the bombardment of Ottoman positions was the heaviest in world history up to that time.

== Background ==
As the main war effort of Greece was initially turned towards Macedonia, on the Epirus front the Hellenic Army was outnumbered by the Ottoman Yanya Corps at the outbreak of hostilities in October 1912. After stopping an initial attack by the Ottoman commander Esad Pasha at Gribovo, however, the Greeks succeeded in liberating Preveza (October 21) and pushing north in the direction of Ioannina, repulsing an Ottoman attack at Pente Pigadia (Beshpinar). On November 5, a small force from Corfu made a landing and captured the coastal area of Himarë without facing significant resistance, and on December 20 Greek troops improved their positions in Epirus and entered Korçë, north of Ioannina, thus cutting off its last supply route and threatening the city's northeastern flank.

== Prelude ==
The terrain south of Ioannina provided excellent defensive ground. Moreover, the Ottoman forces further reinforced their positions with permanent fortifications, constructed under the direction of the German General Colmar von der Goltz. These were equipped with concrete artillery emplacements, bunkers, trenches, barbed wire, searchlights and machine gun positions. The Ioannina fortress area included two major fortresses, those of Bizani and Kastritsa, guarding the main southern approaches, along with five smaller forts in a ring around the city, covering the western and northwestern approaches. The forts were well supplied with artillery, totaling some 102 pieces (most of them 87 mm). By December 1912, both sides were reinforced: the Ottomans received part of the Vardar Army, retreating after the Battle of Monastir, bringing their forces up to some 35,000, while the Greeks also brought up the 2nd Division from Macedonia and a number of volunteer regiments, for a total of 25,000 men. The Greeks launched a first attack on the fortress area on December 14. The Ottomans succeeded in repelling it in a series of actions that lasted until December 22, and even gained some ground, albeit at the cost of high casualties which depleted their numbers to some 26,000 men.

With operations in Macedonia completed, the Greek High Command now turned its attention to Epirus. Three divisions were transferred to the theater, raising the total of Greek troops to ca. 40,000, along with 80 artillery pieces (amongst which 12 heavy 105 mm and 155 mm guns) and six aircraft. On the other hand, an additional number of Ottoman soldiers, who were retreating from the Macedonian front, reinforced the defenders. Throughout the period, the siege continued actively, with artillery duels, attacks by Albanian irregulars on Greek supply lines, and reconnaissance and bombing missions on the city by the Greek airplanes. At the same time, the hardships of the winter affected the morale of both sides. The Greek Epirus front commander, General Konstantinos Sapountzakis, launched a new frontal attack on January 20. Although it gained ground, pushing the defenders back into the fort of Bizani, the high casualty rate and the worsening weather resulted in the operation being suspended a few days later.

During the preparations, a mixed unit that included local women protected the left flank of the Hellenic Army, against a possible attack by Ottoman groups that were stationed in Paramythia. Moreover, groups consisting of local women supported the Greek side in several ways, particularly in the transportation of guns, food, clothes, and other important supplies. On specific occasions women also participated in the armed conflicts against the Ottoman forces, some of them were distinguished in the battlefield, like Maria Nastouli, who reached the rank of captain.

== Battle ==
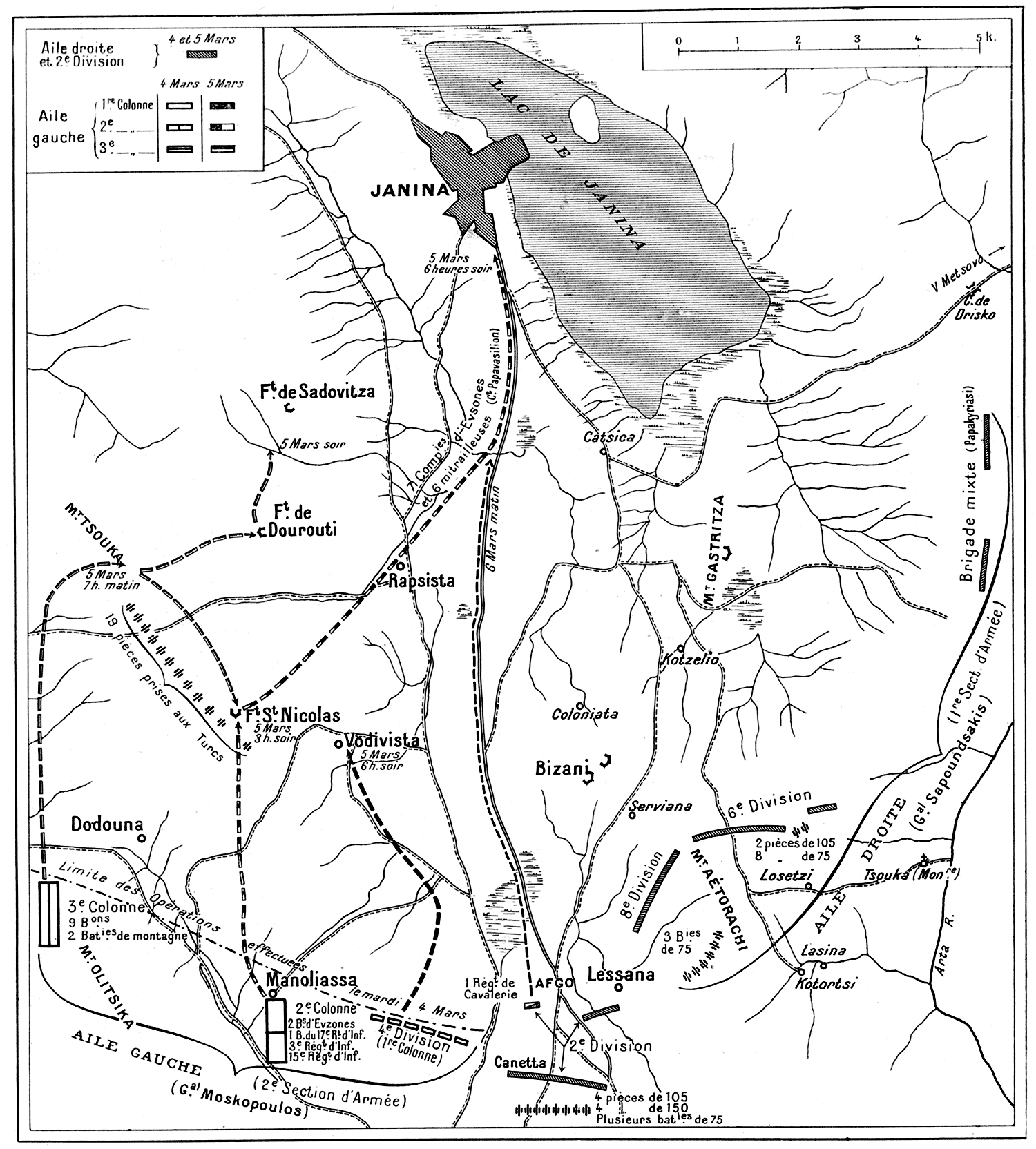
Plan of the Greek flanking move that led to the fall of Ioannina.

After the renewed failure, Sapountzakis was relieved of his command and replaced by Crown Prince Constantine. Constantine now proceeded to carefully marshal his forces, bringing up more men and artillery. The Crown Prince formulated a new plan, whereby his army would feign an attack on Bizani from the southeast, while the main effort would be actually directed on the fortress area's southwestern flank

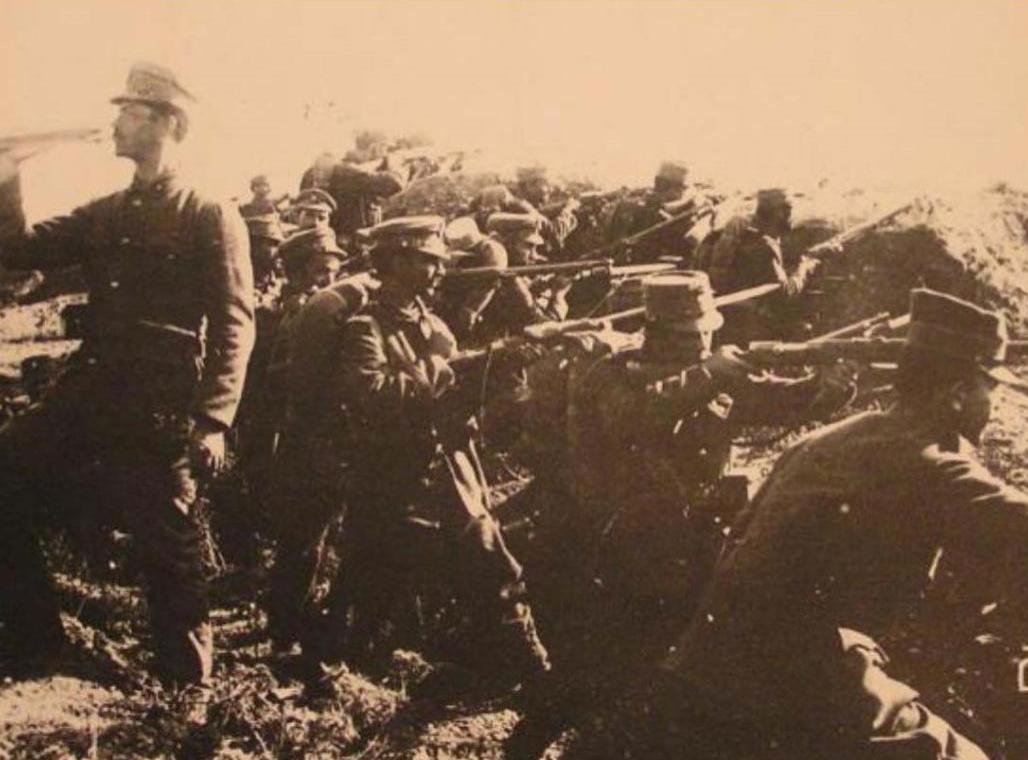
Greek infantry preparing to charge.

The Greek artillery began firing a preparatory bombardment on March 4, continuing through the day. It is estimated that the Greeks fired 150 rounds per gun in this bombardment, while Ottoman counter-fire was hampered by lack of ammunition. The assault was launched on 5 March [O.S. 20 February] 1913, with three Greek infantry divisions—the 4th, 6th and 8th Infantry Divisions—thrusting against the eastern and western sectors of the defensive perimeter. At the same time the Metsovon Joint Brigade launched a diversionary attack from the north. The first Greek units, with heavy artillery support, breached the defensive line in Tsouka sector at morning, and during the following hours the Ottoman defenses were broken in five locations. As a result, the defending Ottoman units from Tsouka to Manoliasa retreated immediately to Ioannina in order to avoid encirclement. Moreover, as these breakthroughs from different axes threatened to collapse the entire defensive perimeter and to cut off his front echelons, Esad Pasha was forced to keep his reserve troops back and engage them in a defensive role. By 18h, the Greek 1st Evzone Regiment, together with the 9th Battalion commanded by Major Ioannis Velissariou, entered the village of Agios Ioannis on the southern outskirts of Ioannina.

As a consequence of the Greek advance, the fortresses of Bizani and Kastritsa were cut off by 16h and isolated from the rest of the Ottoman army and its headquarters in Ioannina. As night fell, the forts ceased firing, and their garrisons abandoned them, trying to escape through the rather loose Greek encirclement to Ioannina. In their attempt to withdraw towards Ioannina, a significant number of Ottoman troops, totaling 35 officers and 935 soldiers, were captured by the Greek units positioned on the city's southern outskirts. Several Ottoman positions capitulated the next morning, although Bizani and Kastritsa continued to resist until after the surrender. Meanwhile, Esad Pasha realized that the battle was lost, and tried to evacuate as many troops and wounded as he could to the north. As the Greeks pressed their advance however, he contacted the city's foreign consulates to seek help in negotiating a surrender. At 23:00 on 6 March [O.S. 21 February] 1913, he agreed upon the unconditional surrender of Ioannina and the Ottoman garrison to the Greeks. The following day the Greek forces under Crown Prince Constantine were parading through the flag-covered streets of the city. On the other hand, Esad Pasha upon arriving in Turkey was welcomed as a national hero.

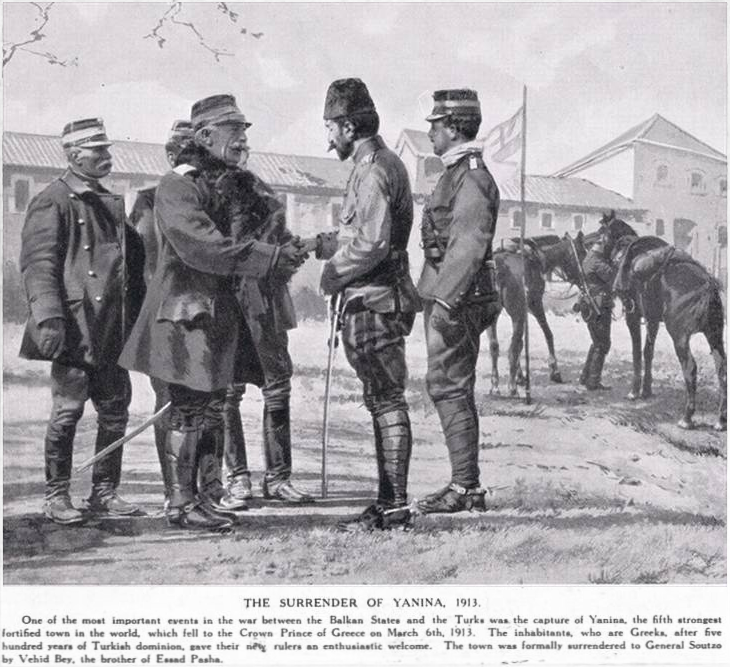
Illustration of the surrender of Yanina by Wehib Pasha, Illustrated by Richard Caton Woodville Jr.

=== Aerial warfare ===
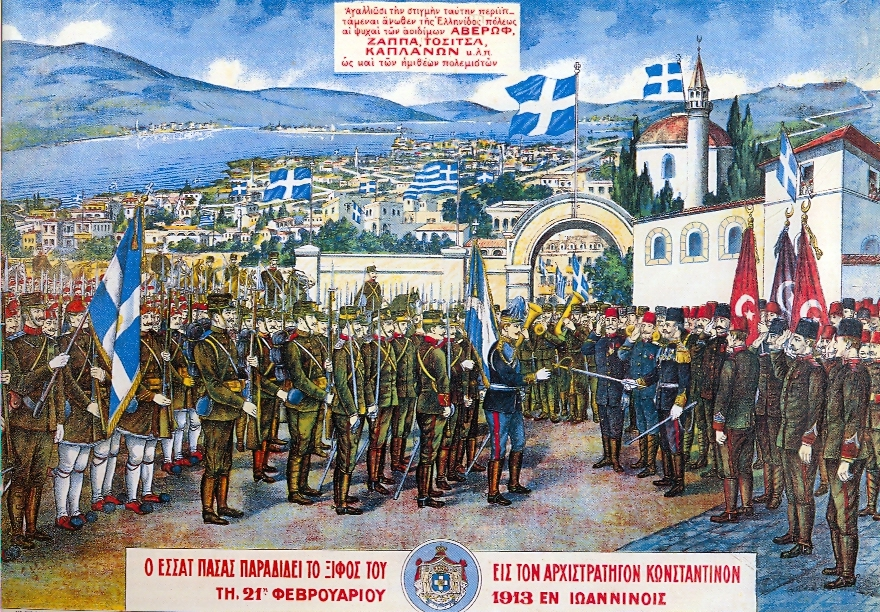
Illustration of the Turkish surrender of Ioannina to the Greeks

The Greek forces used a small fleet of six airplanes, which mainly consisted of Farman HF and MF biplanes during the operations. They used an airfield near Nicopolis and performed several reconnaissance and bombing missions with considerable effect. Among the aviators were Dimitrios Kamperos, Michael Moutoussis and Christos Adamidis, who were flying above the Bizani and Ioannina sectors at a height of 1,600–2,300 meters (5,200–7,500 ft). On numerous occasions the Ottoman troops after recovering from their initial confusion attempted to shoot down the airplanes with their rifles with little success. Nevertheless N. de Sackoff, a Russian pilot flying for the Greeks became the first pilot ever shot down in combat when his biplane was hit by ground fire. He then came down near Preveza, repaired his airplane and resumed flight back to his base. The day Ioannina came under Greek control Adamidis, also a native of the city, landed his Farman MF biplane on the city Town Hall square, to the adulation of an enthusiastic crowd. (Note: Greek aviation saw action in Epirus until the capture of Jannina on 21 February 1913. On that day Lt Adamidis landed his airplane on the Town Hall square, to the adulation of an enthusiastic crowd.)

== Aftermath ==
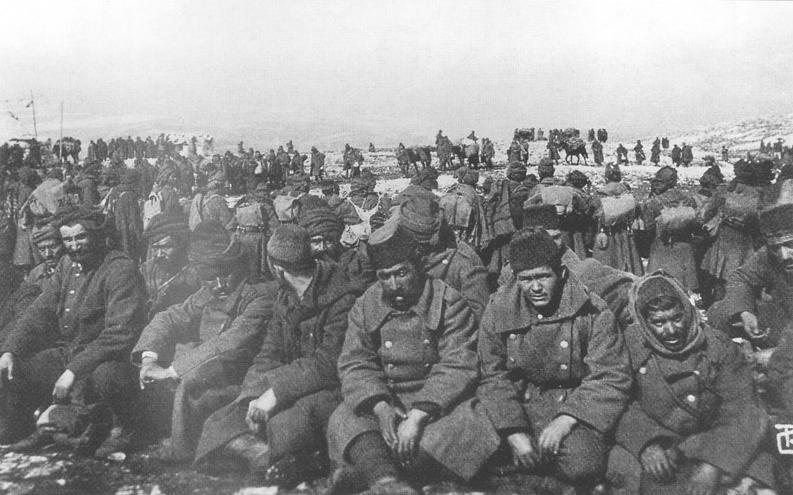
Ottoman prisoners of war. After the battle the Hellenic Army captured around 8,600 prisoners.

During the battle, 2,800 Ottomans died, while the Greeks suffered much lighter losses with 500 dead and wounded. The Greeks also captured some 8,600 prisoners, while the remainder of the Ottoman garrison was able to retreat into Albania. The Greeks also captured 108 artillery pieces and large amounts of matériel. On 16 March [O.S. 3 March] 1913 the Greek forces entered Gjirokastër and Delvinë, and took Tepelenë the next day. At the end of the war they reached a line that stretched from the Ceraunian mountains (above Himarë) on the Ionian coast to Lake Prespa to the east. The success on the Epirus front enabled the Greek headquarters to transfer part of the army to Thessaloniki, in preparation for a confrontation against the Bulgarians. Given the strongly entrenched opposition the Hellenic Army faced, historian Richard Hall cites the Battle of Bizani and the fall of Ioannina as Greece's greatest military achievement in the First Balkan War. Numerical superiority was not a decisive factor for the Greeks during the final assault. Instead it was the way they planned their operations that led to a well coordinated and executed assault that left no opportunity for the Ottoman side to react in time. The surrender of Ioannina secured Greek control of southern Epirus and the Ionian coast. At the same time, it was denied to the newly formed Albanian state, for which it might have provided a southern anchor-point comparable to Shkodër in the north (see also Provisional Government of Albania).
