= Tserovo, Blagoevgrad Province =

Tserovo Церово
- Village
- Location within Bulgaria
- Coordinates: 41°58′N 23°8′E
- Country: Bulgaria
- Province: Blagoevgrad Province
- Municipality: Blagoevgrad

Government
  - Mayor: Ivan Sakov (GERB)

Area
  - Total: 20.9 km^{2} (8.1 sq mi)
- Elevation: 700 m (2,300 ft)

Population (15 December 2010)
  - Total: 694
- GRAO
- Time zone: UTC+2 (EET)
  - Summer (DST): UTC+3 (EEST)
- Postal Code: 2722
- Area code: 073

Tserovo is a village in Blagoevgrad Municipality, in Blagoevgrad Province, Bulgaria. It is situated in Rila mountain 7 kilometers southwest of Blagoevgrad. Cultivating tobacco and sheep and goat farming are the only sources of income for the village.

South of the village on the hills over the left bank of Struma river there are ruins of the mountainous fortress "Tserovo", built in the 3rd century.

== See also ==
Wikimapia for the village with the fortress
