= Battle of Kresna Gorge =

Part of the Second Balkan War

- Part of Second Balkan War
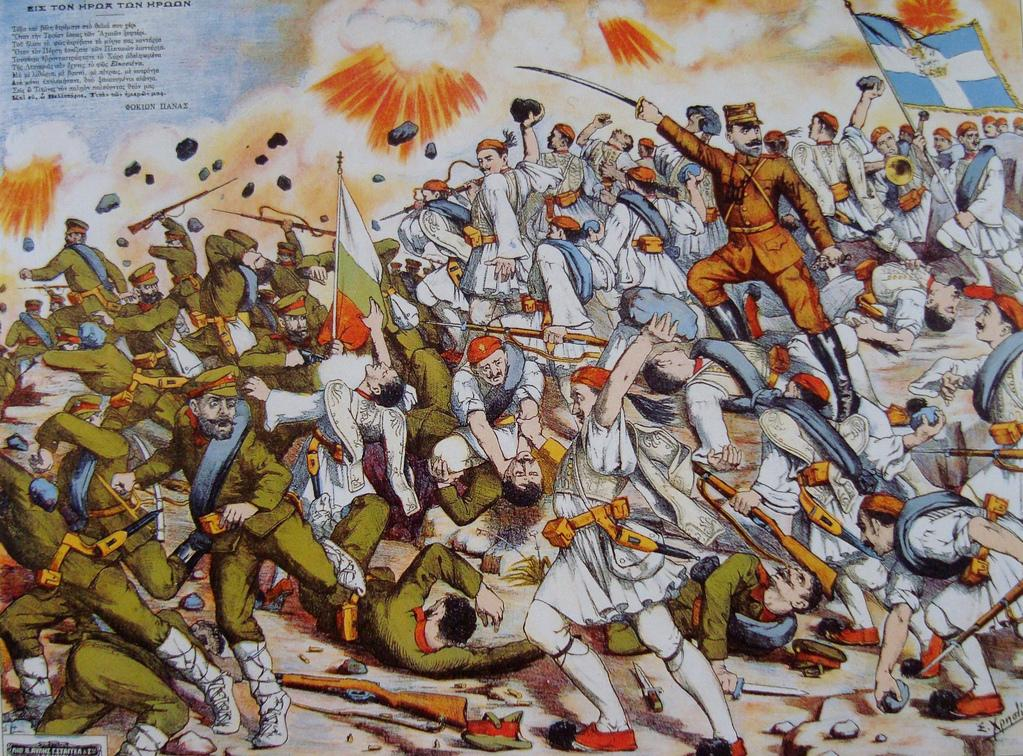
- A Greek lithograph depicting Major Velissariou leading the 1st Evzone Regiment during the battle by Sotiris Christidis
| Date | 21–31 July [O.S. 8–18 July] 1913 |
| Location | Kresna Gorge, Bulgaria 41°48′03.19″N 23°09′34.93″E |
| Result | Inconclusive: Greek army advances through the Kresna gorge.; Bulgarians pressure the Greek flanks.; Greeks forced to assume defensive positions.; Greek march to Sofia halted |

Belligerents
| Bulgaria | (Kingdom of Greece) Greece |

Commanders and leaders
| (Tsardom of Bulgaria (1908–1946)) Mihail Savov (Tsardom of Bulgaria (1908–1946)) Vasil Kutinchev (Tsardom of Bulgaria (1908–1946)) Nikola Ivanov | (Kingdom of Greece) Constantine I |

Strength
| 110 battalions | 80 battalions |

Casualties and losses
| Unknown | 10,000 killed, wounded, or captured |

The Battle of Kresna Gorge was fought in 1913 between the Greeks and the Bulgarians during the Second Balkan War. The battle was fought over an eleven-day period, between 8–18 July, over a front of 20 km, in a maze of forests and mountains. The battle marked the last phase of Greek advances into Bulgarian territory before the ceasefire and the peace treaty.

== Background ==
With the Serbian front static and the Bulgarian Army defeated in Greece, King Constantine I of Greece ordered his army to march deeper into Bulgarian territory and capture the Bulgarian capital, Sofia. Constantine desired a decisive victory in the war despite the objections of Prime Minister Eleftherios Venizelos who realized that the Serbs, having won their territorial objectives, were now trying to put the remaining combat of the war onto the Greeks by staying passive. A truce resulted in both sides claiming victory. From the Greek point of view, after 11 days of fighting, the Bulgarian army had apparently failed to turn the Greek flank, and as a result the Greeks considered the battle a defensive victory. The Bulgarians believed themselves victorious because their attack had stopped the Greek advance on Sofia and forced the Greeks to accept a truce. This view is supported by the view of some historians that the Greek army was threatened with encirclement and annihilation at the end of the war, although the fighting was eventually ended by an armistice. However, the Greeks argued that the Bulgarian army had put all its strength into the long battle, but lacked additional men to complete the Greek siege.

== Conflict ==
=== Greek advance and breaking through the Kresna Pass ===
After the victorious Battle of Doiran the Greek forces continued their advances north. On 18 July, the 1st Greek Division managed to drive back the Bulgarian rear guard and captured an important foothold at the southern end of the Kresna Pass.

In the pass, the Greeks were ambushed by the Bulgarian 2nd and 4th Armies which were newly arrived from the Serbian front and had taken up defensive positions. After bitter fighting, however, the Greeks managed to break through the Kresna Pass. The Greek advance continued and on 25 July, the village of Krupnik, north of the pass, was captured, forcing the Bulgarian troops to withdraw to Simitli. Simitli was captured on 26 July, while during the night of 27–28 July the Bulgarian forces were pushed north to Gorna Dzhumaya (now Blagoevgrad), 76 km south of Sofia.

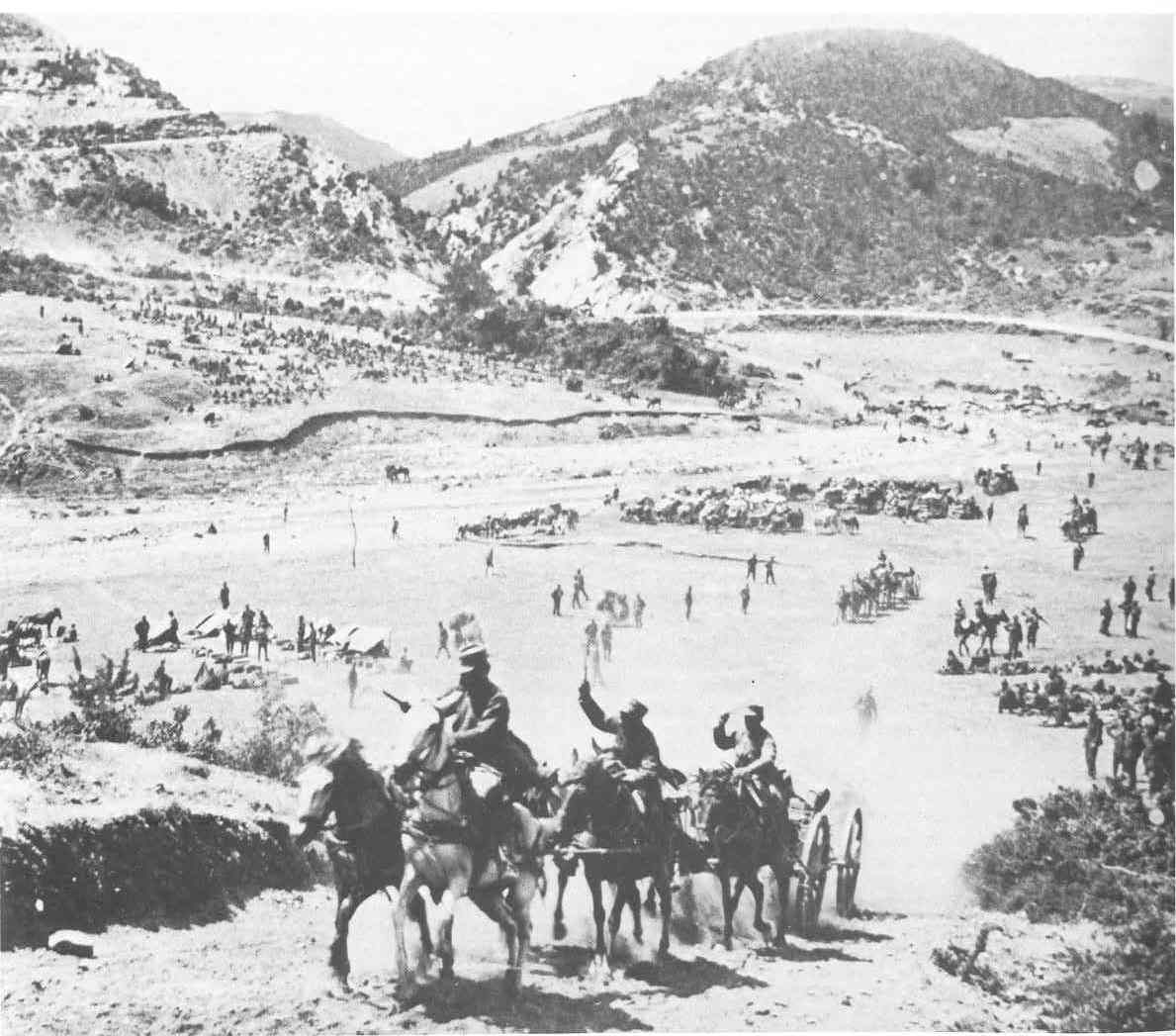
Greek troops advancing through the Kresna Pass.

Meanwhile, the Greek forces continued their march inland into Western Thrace and on 26 July, entered Xanthi. The next day the Greek forces entered Komotini, without incurring Bulgarian opposition.

=== Bulgarian counterattack and armistice ===
The Greek army was stopped in front of Gorna Dzhumaya by significant Bulgarian resistance. On 28 July, Greek forces resumed the attack and captured a line stretching from Cherovo to Hill 1378, southeast of Gorna Dzhumaya.

During the evening of 28 July, however, the Bulgarian army under heavy pressure began to abandon the town. (Note: The information about the Bulgarians stated that there was an exceptional movement of vehicles on the north of A. Tz. Odou, that parts of a strong force were moving from the right to the left bank and that finally serious camps were present around the height. 546, and about 3 km N. of A. Tz .. it had been set on fire.) However, the Greek army was unable to capture Gorna Dzhumaya and it remained under Bulgarian control at the end of the war.

The following day, the Bulgarians attempted to encircle the outnumbered Greeks in a Cannae-type battle by applying pressure on their flanks. Nevertheless, the Greeks launched counterattacks at Razlog and to the west of Kresna. By 30 July, the Bulgarian attacks had largely subsided. On the eastern flank, the Greek army launched an attack towards Razlog through the Predela Pass. The offensive was stopped by the Bulgarian army on the eastern side of the pass and fighting ground to a stalemate. On the western flank, an offensive was launched against Charevo Selo with the objection of reaching the Serbian lines. This failed and the Bulgarian army continued advancing, especially in the south, where by 29 July the Bulgarian forces had cut the Greek line of retreat through Berovo and Strumica, leaving the Greek army with only one route of retreat.

After three days fighting at the sectors of Pehčevo and Razlog, however, the Greek forces retained their positions. On 30 July, the Greek headquarters planned to launch a new attack in order to advance towards the sector of Gorna Dzhumaya. On that day hostilities continued with the Bulgarian forces deployed on strategic positions north and northeast of the town. (Note: June 17: At night the General Army. of the Greek. army ... shot from the north of this lying forest, she returned without completing her mission.)

Meanwhile, King Constantine I, who had neglected a Bulgarian request for truce during the drive for Sofia, informed Prime Minister Venizelos, that his army was "physically and morally exhausted" and urged him to seek cessation of hostilities through Romanian mediation. This request resulted in the Treaty of Bucharest being signed on 31 July [O.S. 18 July] 1913 which ended one of the bloodiest battles of the Second Balkan War.

== Legacy ==
The armistice left both parties claiming victory. From the Greek point of view, after eleven days of battle, the Bulgarians had clearly failed to turn the Greek army's flanks, and consequently the Greeks considered the battle a defensive victory. The Bulgarians believed that they were the victors since their attack successfully stopped the Greek Army's advance towards Sofia and caused the Greeks to accept an armistice. This view is supported by the opinion held by most historians that although the battle was ended inconclusively by the armistice, at the end of the war, the Greek army was threatened by encirclement and annihilation. The Greeks claimed, however, that the Bulgarians had involved all their available forces in the prolonged battle and lacked the additional manpower to complete an encirclement of the Greek forces.

== Gallery ==
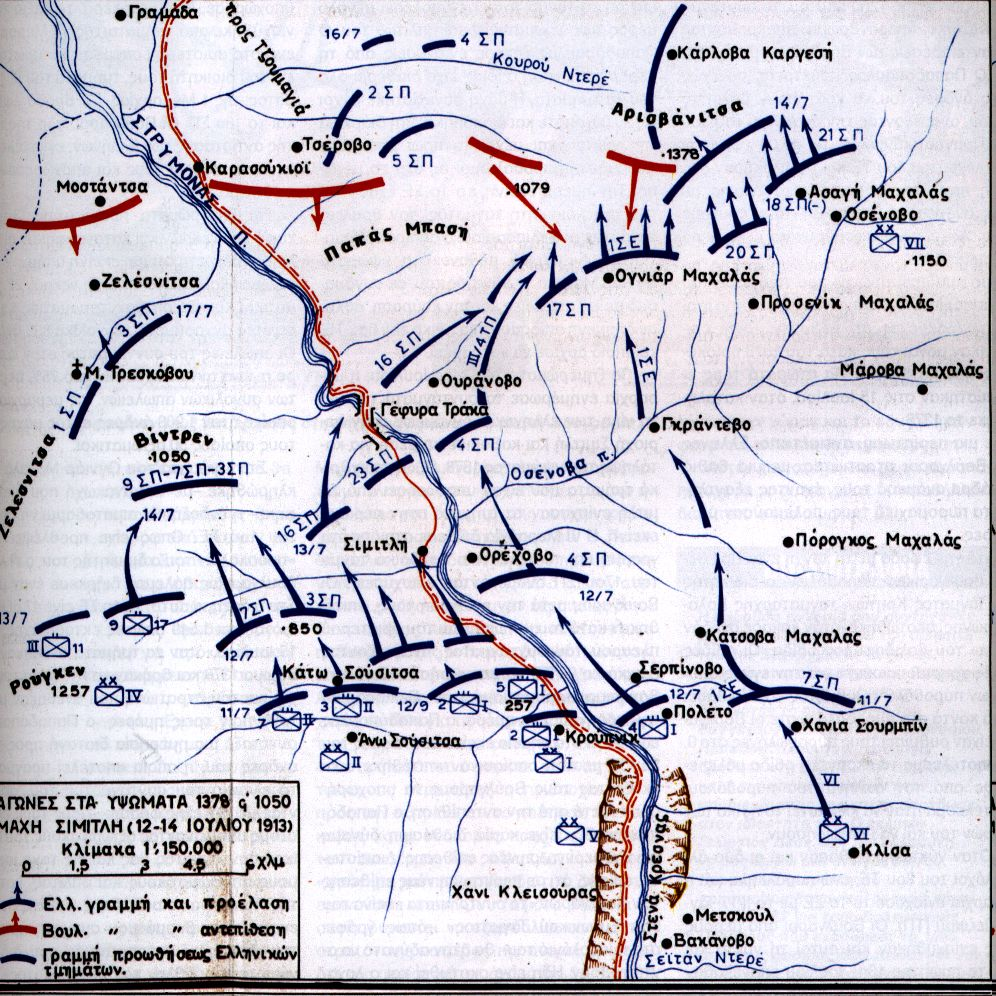
Advance of the Greek forces after breaking through the Kresna Gorge (July, 25–30)

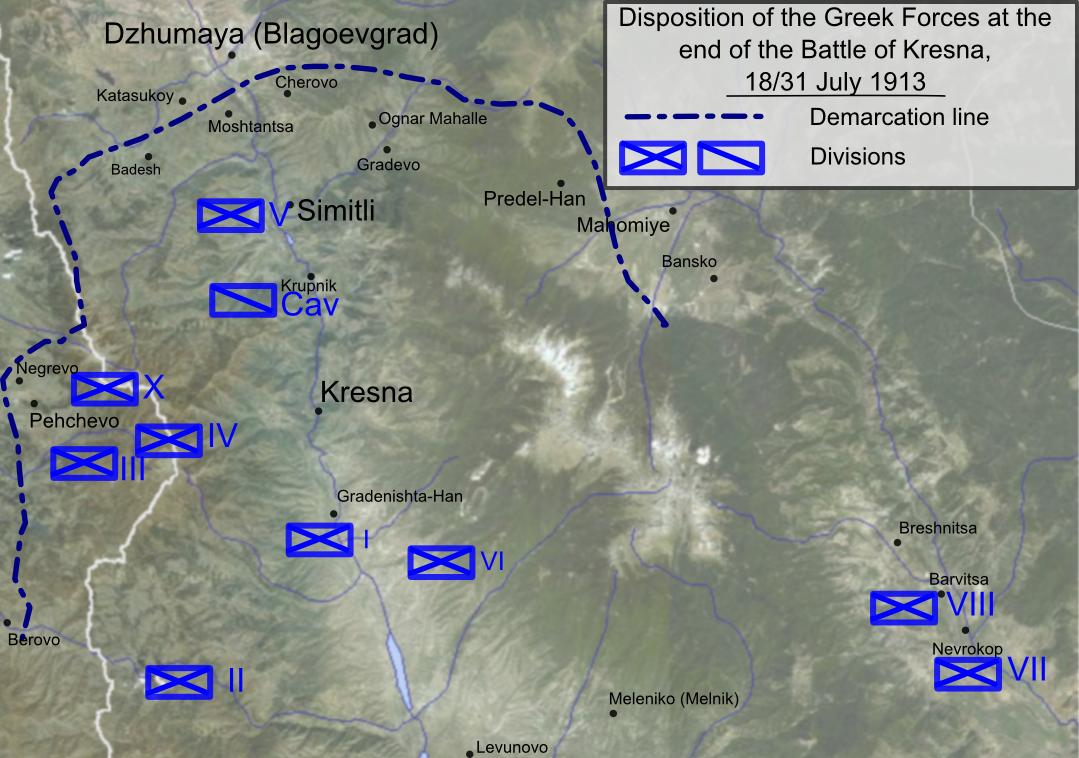
Demarcation line and disposition of the Greek forces, following the Armistice.

Greek artillery advances through the Kresna Pass.

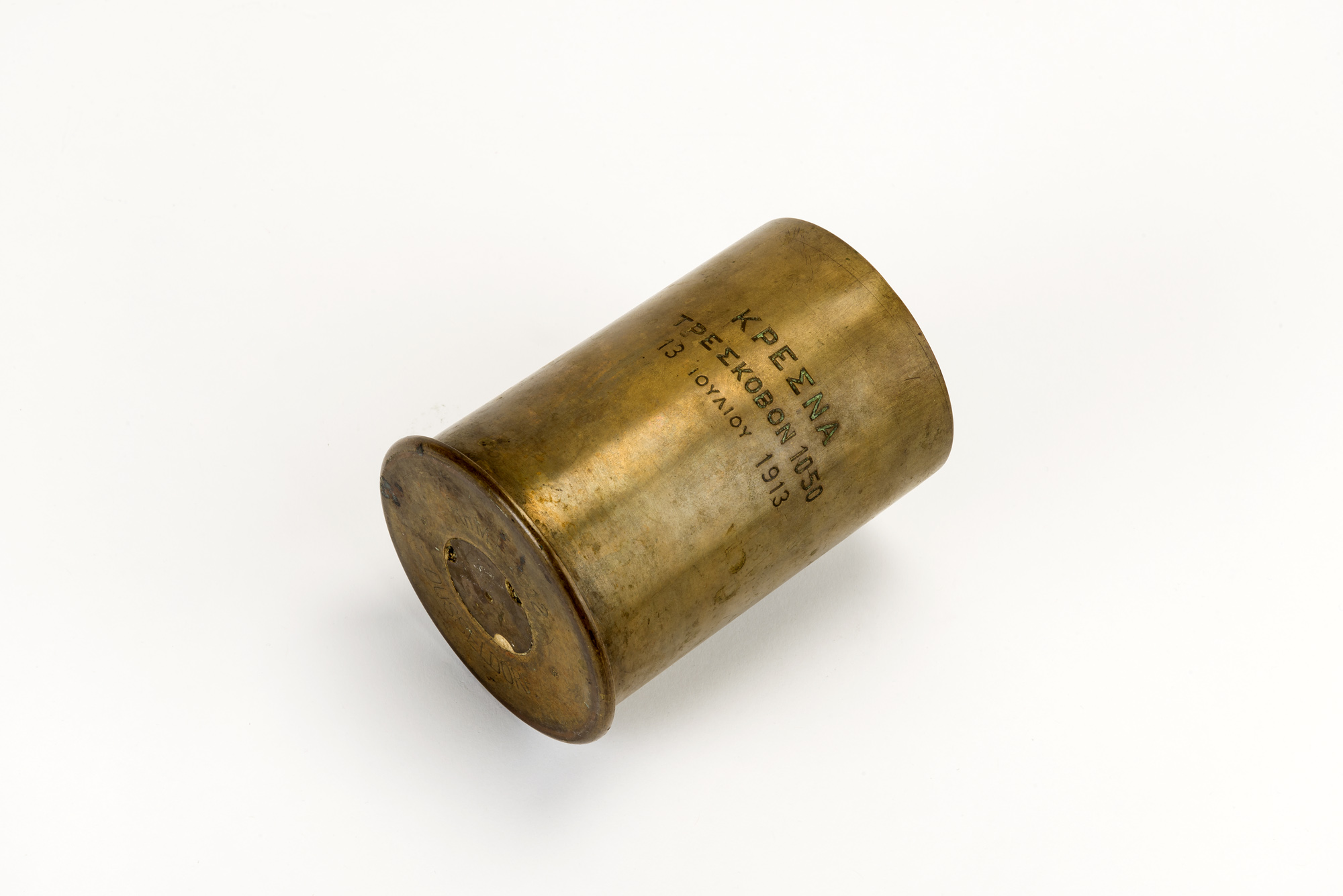
Shell casing from the battle of Kresna Gorge. It bears the engraved inscription in Greek: "Kresna. Treshkovon 1050. 13 July 1913".
