= Battle of Kilkis–Lachanas =

Battle

- Part of Second Balkan War and the Balkan Wars
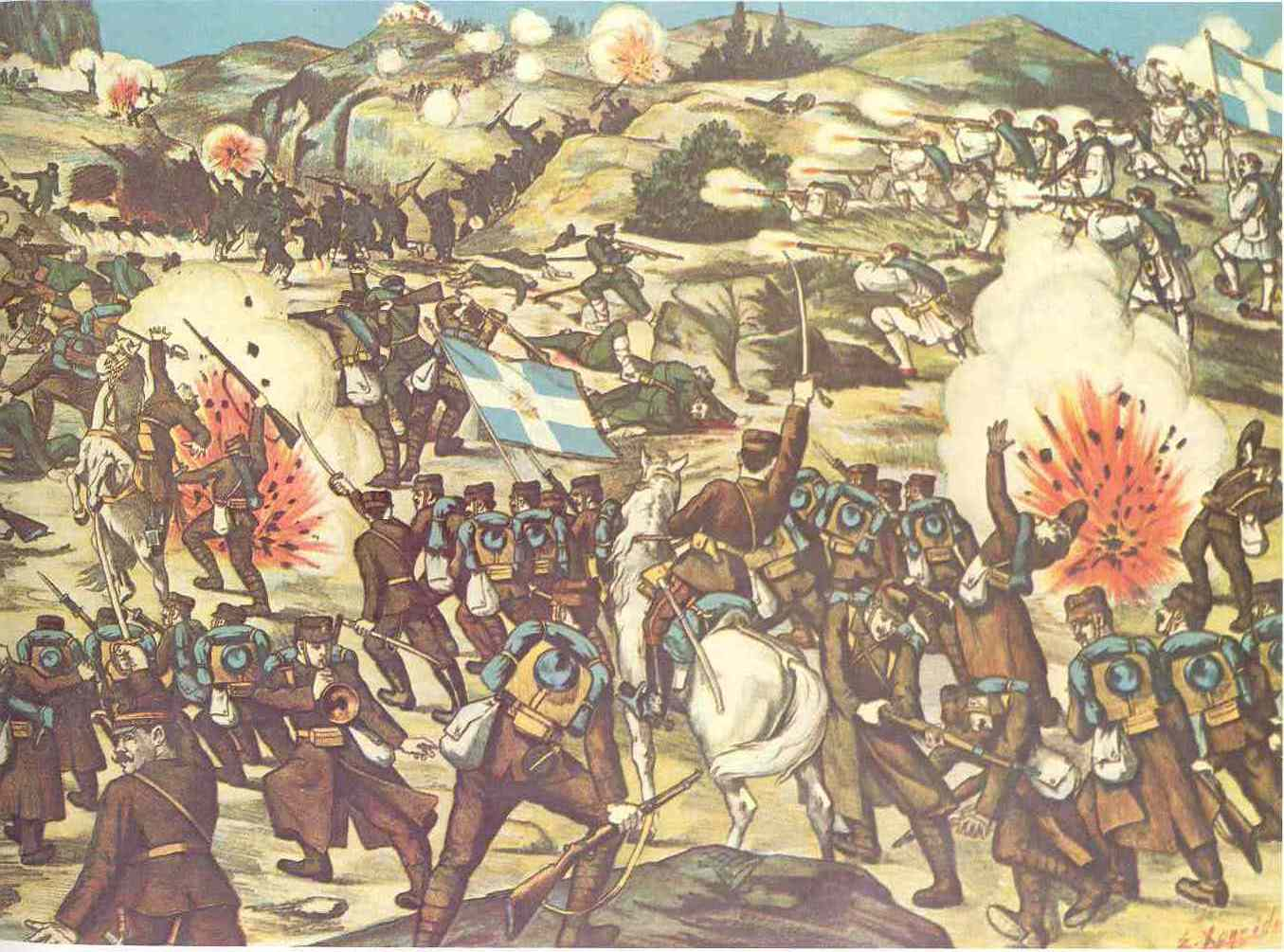
- A Greek lithograph depicting the battle by Sotiris Christidis
Date	19–21 June 1913 (O.S.)
Location	Kilkis and Lachanas, Bulgaria (now Greece) 40°59′37.35″N 22°52′31.32″E
Result	Greek victory: Capture of Kilkis, Lachanas, Gevgelija, Karakoli, and Nigrita; Burning of Kilkis; Expulsion of the Bulgarian population from the town

Belligerents
Bulgaria	(Kingdom of Greece) Greece

Commanders and leaders
Gen. Nikola Ivanov	King Constantine I

Strength
75,076 men 175 guns (57 infantry battalions, 10 cavalry squadrons)	117,861 men 176 guns (73 Infantry Battalions, 8 Cavalry Squadrons)

Casualties and losses
6,971 killed and wounded 2,500 men and 19 artillery pieces captured	8,828 killed and wounded

The Battle of Kilkis–Lachanas took place between Greece and Bulgaria during the Second Balkan War. The two countries fought for the town of Kilkis in Central Macedonia from 19 to 21 June 1913 O.S. with Greece ultimately being victorious

== Background ==
During the night of 16–17 June, the Bulgarians, without an official declaration of war, attacked their former Greek and Serbian allies, and managed to evict the Serbs from Gevgelija, cutting off communication between them and the Greeks. However, the Bulgarians failed to drive the Serbs away from the Vardar/Axios river line. After repulsing the initial Bulgarian attack of 17 June, the Greek army, under King Constantine, advanced with 8 divisions and a cavalry brigade, while the Bulgarians under General Ivanov retreated to the naturally strong defensive position of the Kilkis–Lachanas line.

== Conflict ==
The Bulgarian 2nd Army commanded by General Nikola Ivanov held a line from Lake Dojran south east to Kilkis, Lachanas, Serres and then across the Pangaion Hills to the Aegean Sea. The army had been in place since May and was considered a veteran group having fought at the siege of Adrianople in the First Balkan War. On 16 June, the Bulgarian force included approximately 75,000 men and 175 guns in 57 infantry battalions, 10 cavalry squadrons and 37 batteries. General Ivanov claimed after the war that his Army consisted of only 36,000 men of whom 20,000 were "still untrained" and that many of his units were understrength. The Greek General Staff considerably overestimated the numbers of Bulgarians, reckoning their numbers to be between 80,000 and 105,000. Although General Ivanov probably underestimated the number of his soldiers, he still faced a much larger Greek enemy.

The Greek army, commanded by King Constantine I, had 8 divisions and a cavalry brigade (117,861 men) with 176 artillery guns in an 80 km line extended from the Gulf of Orphanos to the Gevgelija area. Since it was not possible for the Greeks to know where the Bulgarians would attack, it was expected that the Bulgarian army would likely enjoy temporary superiority at a point chosen for the attack. The Greek plans were defensive in nature and they expected that the Bulgarians would strike first in a thrust to capture Thessaloniki. As such, Thessaloniki was garrisoned by the newly raised Thessaloniki Fortress Command. The Greek divisions deployed forward had orders to allow the Bulgarians to attack first while holding their positions as best as they could. The Greek army would concentrate the remainder of its units for a counterattack on the weakest Bulgarian flank. The Greek disposition was as such: On the Greek left the 10th Infantry Division occupied the area around Axioupoli, an Army Section (disbanded when the war started); the 3rd and 5th divisions occupied the area between the Axios and Gallikos rivers; the 4th Division occupied the territory between the Gallikos River and the Thessaloniki-Serres highway; the 1st Division positioned themselves between lakes Langada and Volvi; and the 7th occupied the area between Lake Volvi and the Gulf of Orphanos. The 2nd and 6th divisions were held as reserve north of Thessaloniki, while the Cavalry Brigade was stationed in Sindos west of Thessaloniki.

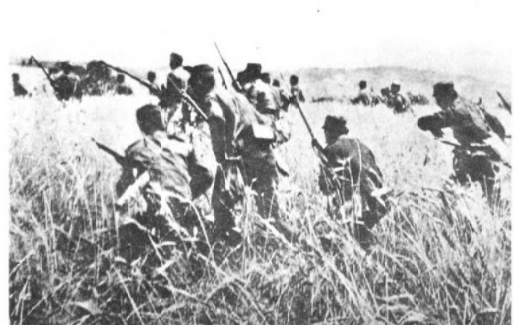
Greek soldiers advance towards Bulgarian positions.

On 15 June, the Bulgarian Army took orders to advance towards Thessaloniki. The Greeks stopped them and by 18 June an order for general counterattack was issued. The next day, the 10th division attacked toward the heights of Kallinovo north of Lake Artzan while the 3rd, 5th, 4th and 2nd divisions attacked toward the area of Kilkis. The 6th and 1st divisions attacked toward Lachanas and the 7th division toward the Karakoli saddle and Nigrita. The Cavalry brigade operated between the 10th and 3rd divisions.

=== Kilkis ===
At Kilkis, the Bulgarians had constructed strong defenses including captured Ottoman guns which dominated the plain below. The area was defended by the Bulgarian 3rd division, minus its 1st brigade. Kilkis itself was garrisoned by the 2nd brigade (Colonel Ribarov) of eight battalions, supported by several artillery batteries. Against them 38 Greek battalions attacked with 100 guns. The 3rd brigade (Colonel Kavarnaliev) covered the sector between Lake Doiran and Lake Ardzan. Following the outbreak of hostilities, reinforcements started arriving on the Bulgarian side, initially in the form of the 10th cavalry regiment which covered the flanks of the Kilkis position, and the Serres brigade which started boarding trains on 18 June.

The Greek divisions attacked across the plain in rushes under Bulgarian artillery fire. On 19 June, the Greeks overran the Bulgarian forward lines everywhere but suffered heavy losses as the Bulgarian artillery fired incessantly with great accuracy guided by their observation on the hills of Kilkis. The 5th division alone suffered some 1,275 losses on that day. On 20 June, despite having committed all forces and advancing steadily, the Greeks failed to break the Bulgarian defence. The Greek Cavalry brigade detected Bulgarian reinforcements arriving by rail. As a result, the Greek HQ ordered the offensive to continue the next morning. The 10th division was ordered to disengage from the enemy at Kalinovo (renamed Soultogianneika between both world wars) and send forces southward to participate in the fighting of Kilkis while the 1st and 6th divisions (at the time engaged in the direction of Lachanas) was ordered to create a 6-battalion strong detachment plus mountain artillery to reinforce the forces attacking Kilkis on the flank.

Acting under the previous order of the Greek HQ which requested Kilkis be captured by the night of 20 June, the 2nd division went forward alone. During the night of 20 June, following an artillery fire exchange, two regiments of the 2nd division crossed the Gallikos River and successively attacked the 1st, 2nd and 3rd defensive lines of the Bulgarians entering the town of Kilkis by the morning of 21 June. In the morning the rest of the Greek divisions joined the attack and the Bulgarians retreated to the north. The Greeks pursued the retreating Bulgarians but lost contact with their enemy due to exhaustion. In the three days battle around Kilkis, the Greeks suffered heavy casualties totalling 5,652 killed and wounded. An additional 276 casualties were suffered by the 10th division which had captured (Gevgelija on 20 June and the hills of Kalinovo in the afternoon of 21 June. Approximately 500 Bulgarian soldiers, 3 guns and many rifles had been captured.

=== Lachanas ===
Similar to the defense of Kilkis, the Bulgarians also had prepared defensive works at Lachanas. Like Kilkis, the hills at Lachanas provided the Bulgarians with excellent fields of fire.

On 19 June, the Greek 6th division advance from Assiros (Yuvesna) toward Lachanas and succeeded in capturing the Dichalo-Klepe line after losing some 530 men. The 1st division advanced from the south and successfully captured Vertiskos. On 20 June, the two Greek divisions advanced further and joined their flanks while they made contact with the main Bulgarian defensive location of Lachanas despite the fire from the Bulgarian artillery. During the night of 20 June, the order from HQ to create a detachment to hold the forces attacking Kilkis arrived. In the morning of 21 June, the Bulgarians concentrated their artillery fire on the Greek 5th regiment. Observing the 3rd battalion withdrawing to participate in the detachment for Kilkis, the Bulgarians saw an opportunity and attacked the 1st battalion forcing it to retreat with heavy losses. A counterattack with the 2nd battalion led by the regiment commander stopped the Bulgarians. Following the fall of Kilkis in the morning, the order for the formation of the detachment was cancelled. At 15:00, the two Greek divisions attacked the Bulgarian position in close coordination with artillery and by 16:00 broke through the Bulgarian defence. The Bulgarians retreated in disorder leaving 16 guns and 500 prisoners in the hands of the Greeks.

Meanwhile, the Greek 7th division had been fighting on the far east flank. On 19 June, the 7th division successfully captured the saddle of Karakoli and then continued on to capture Nigrita without resistance on 20 June. Meanwhile, a Bulgarian force consisting of regimental staff and one battalion was advancing aggressively toward Karakoli. The force was ultimately encircled and surrendered with 10 officers and 1,500 men. On 21 June, the 7th division continued its slow advance. Even though it was informed of the Bulgarian defeat and retreat over Orliako bridge, the 7th's columns advanced too slowly to block the Bulgarians. The division was heavily criticized for what was considered an unacceptable failure.

The two Greek divisions suffered 2,701 killed and wounded at Lachanas while the 7th division suffered a further 199 casualties.

== Aftermath ==
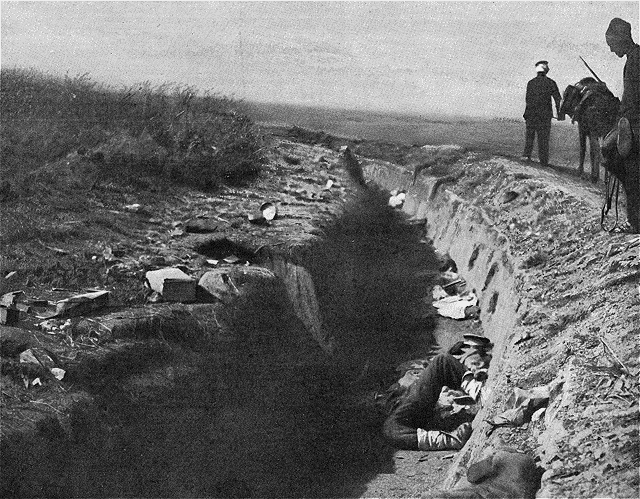
Bulgarian trench after the battle of Kilkis

The defeat of the Bulgarian 2nd Army by the Greeks was the greatest military disaster suffered by the Bulgarians in the 2nd Balkan war. Bulgarian sources estimated a total of 6,971 casualties. The Greeks reportedly suffered 8,828 casualties. On the Bulgarian right, the Evzones captured Gevgelija and the heights of Matsikovo. As a consequence, the Bulgarian line of retreat through Doiran was threatened and Ivanov's army began a desperate retreat which at times threatened to become a rout. Reinforcements came too late and joined the retreat toward Strumica and the Bulgarian border. The Greeks captured Dojran on 5 July but were unable to cut off the Bulgarian retreat through Struma Pass. On 11 July, the Greeks came in contact with the Serbs and then pushed on up the Struma River until they reached Kresna Gorge on 24 July.

The casualties and losses of the battle were the heaviest in the modern Greek military history. However, the conclusion was a triumph for the Greeks and boosted the popularity of the new King. Due to its significance for the Greeks, the Battle of Kilkis gave its name to a Greek battleship, the Kilkis, in 1914.

The battle is also commemorated at the Kilkis War Museum and the Battle of Lahanas Museum.
