= 1st Infantry Regiment (Greece) =

- Active: 1885–1941; 1951–1998; 2013–present
- Country: Greece
- Branch: Hellenic Army
- Type: Motorized infantry
- Size: Regiment
- Part of: 9th Infantry Brigade (Greece)
- Garrison/HQ: Athens (1885–1941), Kalambaka (1951–1952), Florina (1952–1998, 2013–)
- Engagements: Greco-Turkish War of 1897; Cretan Revolt; Balkan Wars; First Balkan War; Battle of Sarantaporo; Battle of Yenidje; Battle of Chios; Battle of Bizani; Second Balkan War; Battle of Kilkis-Lachanas; Battle of Doiran; World War I; Macedonian front; Russian Civil War; Allied intervention in the Russian Civil War; Southern Front; Southern Russia Intervention; Greco-Turkish War (1919–1922); Greek Summer Offensive; Second Battle of İnönü; Battle of Kütahya–Eskişehir; Battle of the Sakarya; Greek Retreat; Battle of Dumlupınar; 11 September 1922 Revolution; World War II; Greco-Italian War; Italian Spring Offensive; Battle of Greece; Greek Civil War; Operation Koronis
- Decorations: Commanders Cross of the Cross of Valour; War Cross 2nd & 3rd Class; Medal for Outstanding Acts

Commanders
- Notable commanders: Timoleon Vassos

The 1st Infantry Regiment "Sangarios" (Greek: 1ο Σύνταγμα Πεζικού «ΣΑΓΓΑΡΙΟΣ», 1ο ΣΠ) is a motorized infantry regiment of the Hellenic Army. Established in 1885 at Athens, it fought in all conflicts in which Greece participated until World War II, when it was disbanded following the German invasion of Greece. It was re-established as the 21st Brigade (21η Ταξιαρχία) in 1945, and participated in the Greek Civil War. Receiving the designation 1st Infantry Regiment again in 1951, it was headquartered in Florina from 1952 until its disbandment in 1998. In 2013 it was re-established at Florina.

== History ==
From the establishment of the Hellenic Army until the 1880s, the largest units created were battalions, due to the small extent of the Kingdom of Greece and the small size of its army. Only following the annexation of Thessaly in 1881 did both expand enough to warrant the establishment of regimental-sized units, and on 26 June 1885, by royal decree, the 27 available battalions were formed into nine regiments. As part of this reorganization, the 1st Infantry Regiment was established at Athens. During the Greco-Turkish crisis of 1886, the regiment was ordered into Thessaly, but owing to the extremely poor state of the transportation network and the lack of sufficient means, the move proceeded very slowly, with only one battalion reaching as far as Thebes, and another Livadeia. With the end of the crisis, the regiment returned to Athens.

The regiment took part in the Greco-Turkish War of 1897 as part of the 2nd Infantry Division, except for one battalion that was sent to Crete as part of an expeditionary force under Colonel Timoleon Vassos. During the war in Thessaly, which was disastrous for Greece, the regiment fought in the battles of Mati, Domokos, Farsala, and Taratsa. It returned to Athens after the signing of the Treaty of Constantinople in November 1897.

=== Balkan Wars ===
In the lead-up to the First Balkan War, the regiment was mobilized on 17 September 1912, again as part of the 2nd Division, in the Army of Thessaly. With the outbreak of the war on 5 May, it crossed the border and participated in the opening skirmishes of the Battle of Elassona. On 9 October it fought in the Battle of Sarantaporos in the area of Vigla. Following the Greek victory there, the regiment advanced in the direction of Kozani. During the Battle of Giannitsa on 18 October, the regiment was detached as reinforcements to the 3rd Infantry Division. Following the capture of Thessaloniki, in November the 3rd Battalion furnished troops for the Greek fleet's landing operations against various Ottoman-held Aegean islands, notably participating in the capture of Chios. After that, the 3rd Battalion was moved by sea to the Epirus front, followed by the 1st and 2nd Battalions that moved over land. The latter participated in operations in the directions of Delviniko, but by February 1913 the entire regiment was gathered, as part of the 2nd Division, before the Ottoman fortified position of Bizani, that covered the city of Ioannina. The regiment held the sector of the Avgo height, at the centre of the Greek front for the Battle of Bizani. After the capture of Ioannina, the regiment participated in the Greek army's northward advance in the direction of Delvinë–Sarandë–Gjirokaster. In March 1913, it returned to Thessaloniki.

With the outbreak of the Second Balkan War against Bulgaria, the regiment was the first Greek unit to go into action, being tasked with neutralizing the Bulgarian garrison in Thessaloniki. This was carried out within the first day of the war (17 June), and on the next day the regiment moved towards the front. It participated in the Battle of Kilkis on 19–21 June, followed by the Battle of Doiran. The regiment then followed the general advance of the Greek army into Bulgaria through the Strymon River valley, capturing Strumica and Gorna Djumaya, where the armistice of 18 July found it.

=== World War I and Ukraine ===
Following Greece's official entry into the First World War in June 1917, the 1st Infantry Regiment was mobilized in February–March 1918. In April–May it was moved to Thessaloniki, continuing its training, along with the rest of the 2nd Division. On 5–9 June the 2nd Division was moved to the Strymon sector of the Macedonian front, in the area of Provatas, replacing the British 28th Division. On 26 August, the entire division was moved to the Ammoudia–Dasochori–Chrysochorafa line. Following the armistice with Bulgaria on 16 September, on 23 September the division was moved to the Topolnitsa–Neo Petritsi area. Four days later it was relocated to the mouths of the Strymon, in the Vrasna–Irakleitsa area.

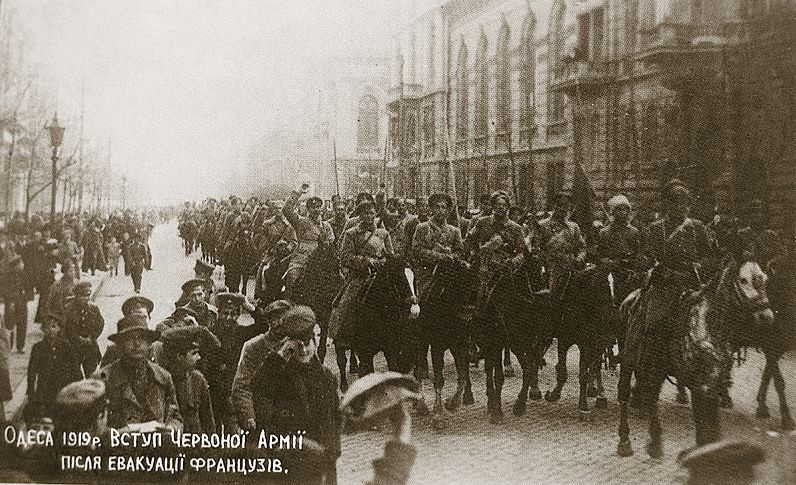
Entry of the Red Army in Odessa, April 1919

In order to gain support for Greece's territorial claims after World War I, the Greek government decided to participate in the Allied intervention in the Russian Civil War. In preparation for the division's transfer to Ukraine, it moved to the port of Stavros on 17 November. then, from the area of Amphipolis, it began its movement to Thessaloniki on 9 February 1919. When the regiment arrived in Thessaloniki on 13 February, it mustered 85 officers and 2041 other ranks. The regiment embarked on steam liners on 18 and 20 February. It arrived at Odessa on 22 February. The 1st and 2nd Battalions were sent to assist other Allied troops in the occupation Kherson two days later, while the 3rd Battalion landed at Odessa. On 25 February, the remainder of the regiment returned to Odessa. On 28 February, the 3rd Battalion moved by rail to Berezivka, where it was placed under the command of the local French forces. On 1 March, the 2nd Battalion and the 1st Company moved to cover the southern approaches to Tylihul Estuary from the direction of Nikolaev, occupying their positions on 3 March. On the same day, the remainder of the 1st Battalion also moved to Berezivka.

On 5 March, following Bolshevik attack on the Berezivka position, the Greek and French forces retreated towards Odessa. On 20 March, the 1st Company, in danger of being cut off, abandoned the Popovka pass and returned to Odessa on the next day. On the same day, the 2nd Battalion likewise abandoned its exposed position and returned to the vicinity of Odessa, where it came under the command of the 7th Infantry Regiment. The remainder of the Regiment was moved to the suburb of Dalnyk on 22 March, and Frundstal on the next day, to cover the southward evacuation of Allied forces from Odessa, while 3rd Battalion moved to Josefstal and Peterstal. On 24 March 10th and 11th Companies, along with the 3rd Battery, established defensive positions at Tatarka, before moving to Mariental on 26 March, and reuniting with regimental command at Mayilki on the 27th. 2nd Battalion, which had remained behind, moved to Dalnyk and Gross-Liebental on the 24th, reaching Neuburg on 26 March, and Frundstal on 27 March. On the night of 27 March, the entire regiment crossed the Dnieper river into Bessarabia. After reassembling, from 30 March to 6 June it assumed responsibility of guarding the river, until relieved by Romanian troops. On 8 June the regiment moved to the area of Kuru Dere, and from 22 June it began moving toward the port of Galați. There, on 28 and 29 June, it embarked for Smyrna.

=== Asia Minor Campaign ===
After the withdrawal from southern Russia, the regiment landed at Smyrna on 5 July 1919, moving to quarters in Turbali, and thence to Ayasoluk (near ancient Ephesus). In mid-September, the regiment was engaged in the first clashes with Turkish nationalist irregular forces in the area of Theira.

In March–May 1920, the regiment was involved in a series of clashes with Turkish forces in the area of Kisak Dağ. It then participated in the summer offensive, moving to Plarköy (10 June). After an arduous advance through Bozdağ, on 16 June the regiment captured the city of Alaşehir (ancient Philadelphia), forcing the Turkish forces to withdraw to Uşak. The regiment participate din the March 1921 offensive, fighting battles at Dumlupınar, Bal Mahmud, and advancing to Afyonkarahisar. It was engaged by Turkish forces at the mountainous area of Krikli on 2–4 July, and heavy fighting at Ak Bunar on 8 July, requiring the assistance of the 4th Infantry Regiment. With the renewed Greek successes at the Battle of Kütahya–Eskişehir, the regiment resumed its advance on 8–15 July, reaching the villages of Saltıdere and Maradji. In the subsequent advance towards Ankara and the resulting Battle of Sakarya, the regiment crossed the Sakarya River (Sangarios in Greek) on 7 August, and fought fierce battles at Taburoğlu (12 August) and Soğolaci (16–17 August). When the Greek retreat began, the regiment re-crossed the Sakarya on 31 August, and was obliged to fight off a number of Turkish attacks on 6, 18, 20, 21–25 September, and 7, 13, 14 October, until it reached the new Greek lines at Çivril in November, where the regiment went into winter quarters.

Following the decisive Turkish victory at the Battle of Dumlupınar, on 30 August 1922 the regiment began to retreat towards the western coast of Asia Minor. Marching via Sardis and Nif, it reached the port of Çeşme, where it embarked for the Greek islands of Chios and Lesbos on 3 September. The regiment joined the 11 September 1922 Revolution that broke out among the surviving Greek units in the Aegean islands, and on 12 September sailed with the fleet and the rest of the army to Athens. On 14 September, with the revolution having prevailed, the regiment encamped in Syntagma Square in front of the Old Royal Palace, and took over the police directorate of Athens, the Athens garrison command, and the offices of the Attica and Boeotia Prefecture.

=== Interwar and Greco-Italian War ===
Following the end of the Asia Minor war, the regiment remained in Athens, as part of 2nd Infantry Division, throughout the interwar period. On 28 November 1935, the late King Constantine I (r. 1913–1917, 1920–1922), the father of the reigning King George II, was declared the regiment's honorary colonel-in-chief. Its men thereafter wore the royal cypher, a capital kappa topped by a crown (golden for staff officers, silver for junior officers, red for NCOs and other ranks), on their epaulettes.

Fascist Italy invaded Greece on 28 October 1940 and a general mobilization was declared. The 1st Regiment quickly reached its full strength, and on 1 November sailed from Elefsina to Volos, to be used as a reserve for the Greek army fighting in Epirus. The regiment arrived at Volos on 4 November. Soon after it was bombarded by the Italian Royal Air Force. Over the next two months it followed the advance of the Greek army, moving on foot via Trikala and Florina. The regiment was finally sent to the front line in early January, when it took over a front sector in Mount Tomorr, under the command of 16th Infantry Brigade (soon expanded into the 16th Infantry Division). The regiment fought its most important battle of the war during the Italian Spring Offensive in March 1941, at the battle of Teke Hill. Following the German invasion of Greece on 6 April, and the rapid advance of the German forces, the Greek army in Albania started to retreat. The regiment retreated via Moscopole, Erseka, Konitsa, and Zagori, reaching Metsovo, where it was ordered disbanded after the capitulation of the Greek army in Epirus to the Germans (21 April).

=== Greek Civil War ===
Following the liberation of Greece in autumn 1944, the Greek army bean to be re-established in spring 1945. The 3rd Greek Mountain Brigade's 1st Battalion provided the core of the 21st Brigade (21η Ταξιαρχία), which began being formed in April 1945 at Chalkida, with recruits from Euboea, Lamia, and Amfissa. Originally placed under the newly re-established 2nd Infantry Division, in October 1945 the brigade was moved to Kozani, under the control of the Superior Military Command of Western Macedonia, which later became the 15th Infantry Division.

From April 1946, the brigade participated in clean-up operations against the Communist guerrillas, in the first stages of the Greek Civil War. The brigade fought in the Battle of Deskati on 21 September 1946, Operation Ierax in May 1947, the defence of Grevena on 25 July 1947, and the operations around Metsovo. In summer 1948 it fought in the first battle of Grammos (Operation Koronis), and the operations against Mount Vitsi in October. It fought in the defence of Florina on 12 February 1949, and fought off a communist offensive in Derveni on 13 May. Placed again under 2nd Division, the brigade participated in the decisive second battle of Grammos (Operation Pyrsos) in August 1949, which ended the civil war with the defeat of the communist Democratic Army of Greece. After mopping-up operations in the area of Mount Beles, in December 1949 and until April 1950 the brigade was based at Veroia. From then until January 1951 it was engaged in operations against guerrilla remnants in the Xanthi–Komotini area. It then returned to the area of Kalambaka, where it assumed a role as a training centre.

=== History since 1951 ===
By order of the Hellenic Army General Staff, on 30 April 1951, the brigade was renamed as the 1st Infantry Regiment, as part of 2nd Infantry Division. The regiment was moved to Florina in October 1952, replacing the 32nd Infantry Regiment. From January 1957, the regiment was subordinated to 9th Infantry Division. The regiment remained there until its disbandment on 31 March 1998, as part of the reorganization of the 9th Infantry Division as the 9th Infantry Brigade.

The regiment was re-established on 1 November 2013, again at Florina, after the 9th Infantry Brigade was moved to Kozani.

== Casualties ==
The data are approximate, as the casualty lists are incomplete.

Conflict	Officers	Other ranks
War of 1897	2	18
Balkan Wars	17	250
Ukraine campaign	4	126
Asia Minor campaign	26	874
Greco-Italian War	5	50
Civil War	5	110

== Honours ==
The regimental flag was honoured by the award of the Commander's Cross of the Cross of Valour, the Cross of Valour in Gold (2 times), the War Cross 2nd and 3rd class, and the Medal of Outstanding Acts.

== Sources ==
- Ιστορία Ιου Συντάγματος Πεζικού [History of the 1st Infantry Regiment] (in Greek), Hellenic Army General Staff, Army History Directorate, December 1962
