= Alexandros Mazarakis-Ainian =

Greek general (c. 1874–1943)

- Αλέξανδρος Μαζαράκης-Αινιάν
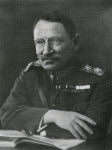
- Alexandros Mazarakis-Ainian c. 1924

Minister of National Education
- In office 6 – 10 March 1933
- President: Alexandros Zaimis
- Prime Minister: Alexandros Othonaios
- Preceded by: Alexandros Mylonas
- Succeeded by: Petros Rallis

Minister of Aviation
- In office 9 – 10 March 1933
- President: Alexandros Zaimis
- Prime Minister: Alexandros Othonaios

Minister of Foreign Affairs
- In office 6 – 7 March 1933
- President: Alexandros Zaimis
- Prime Minister: Alexandros Othonaios

Minister of Military Affairs
- In office 4 December 1926 – 4 July 1928
- President: Pavlos Kountouriotis
- Prime Minister: Alexandros Zaimis
- Preceded by: Georgios Kondylis
- Succeeded by: Themistoklis Sofoulis

Personal details
- Born: c. 1874 Athens, Kingdom of Greece
- Died: 1943 (aged 68–69) Athens, Hellenic State
- Relations: Konstantinos Mazarakis-Ainian (brother); Ioannis Mazarakis-Ainian (nephew)
- Parent: Aganice Ainianos
- Awards: Medal of Milos Obilić in Gold

Military service
- Allegiance: Kingdom of Greece; Provisional Government of National Defence; Second Hellenic Republic
- Branch/service: Hellenic Army
- Years of service: 1890–1920; 1922–1937
- Rank: Lieutenant General
- Commands: Smyrna Division; Army of Evros (Chief of Staff); Chief of the Hellenic Army General Staff
- Battles/wars: Greco-Turkish War (1897); Macedonian Struggle; Balkan Wars; First Balkan War; Second Balkan War; World War I; Macedonian Front; Greco-Turkish War (1919–1922); Greek landing at Smyrna; Greek Summer Offensive

Alexandros Mazarakis-Ainian (Greek: Αλέξανδρος Μαζαράκης-Αινιάν, c. 1874–1943) was a Hellenic Army officer who rose to the rank of lieutenant general. He served thrice as Chief of the Hellenic Army General Staff, occupied various important ministerial positions and became president of the Academy of Athens.

== Life ==
=== Early life and career ===
Alexandros Mazarakis-Ainian was born in Athens in about 1874. He entered the Hellenic Army Academy in 1890 and was commissioned a second lieutenant of Artillery on 30 June 1895. He participated in the Greco-Turkish War of 1897 commanding an artillery battery, and served for three years in the newly founded Geographical Service.

In 1905, during the Greek Struggle for Macedonia against the Bulgarian-sponsored Internal Macedonian Revolutionary Organization (IMRO), he was attached to the Greek Consulate-General in Thessaloniki under the cover name Ioannidis. He served there for three and a half years, until the end of the Struggle in 1908. In 1906, he was promoted to lieutenant.

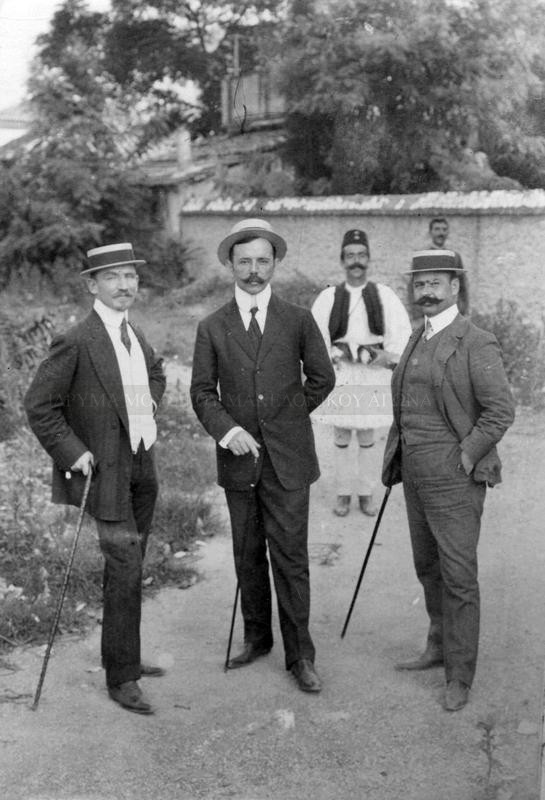
Mazarakis-Ainian (left) with other Greek officials at the garden of the Greek Consulate-General in Thessaloniki, during the Macedonian Struggle.

=== Balkan Wars and World War I ===
After returning from Macedonia, he came first in a contest for further studies in the École Supérieure de Guerre in France. In the Balkan Wars he served as a staff officer in the 7th Infantry Division. In 1914, he was promoted to major and became chief of staff of the 5th Infantry Division at Drama. In September 1916, he joined the Venizelist Movement of National Defence in Thessaloniki. Promoted to lieutenant colonel and full colonel, he served in various General Staff departments during World War I. He then accompanied Prime Minister Eleftherios Venizelos as a military expert to the Paris Peace Conference, and prepared ethnological and military studies to support the Greek claims.

=== Division commander in Asia Minor ===
He returned to Greece in July 1919, and assumed command of the Smyrna Division in Asia Minor. In 1920 he was promoted to major general, and led his division to the capture of Balıkesir and in the advance towards Bursa during the Greek summer offensive. From there he and his division were recalled to be used in a landing operation in support of the occupation of Eastern Thrace: Mazarakis commanded the landings of troops ferried from Asia at Ereğli and Rodosto, and thence advanced north. After overcoming Turkish resistance at Lule Burgas, Babaeski and Çorlu and capturing the local Turkish commander, Cafer Tayyar, his units reached Adrianople. Returning to Asia, he led his division to new positions around Bursa, and commanded a series of raids against Turkish territory. Following the Venizelist defeat in the November 1920 elections, he resigned his commission.

In 1921, he published a series of articles criticizing the new government's conduct of the war in Asia Minor, recommending the stabilization and fortification of the then-held lines instead of an advance into the interior of Turkey. Following the Greek defeat and retreat from Asia Minor in August 1922, he was appointed Greek representative at the armistice negotiations at Mudanya, but initially refused to sign the Armistice of Mudanya when it was revealed that Greece would have to evacuate Eastern Thrace. He was subsequently recalled to active service and placed as chief of staff of the Army of Evros in Western Thrace, and then participated in the Greek mission to Conference of Lausanne as a military adviser.

=== Senior military commands in the Interwar period ===
In 1924, he was promoted to lieutenant general and appointed Chief of the Hellenic Army General Staff, beginning the process for its reorganization and re-equipment following the Asia Minor Disaster. He was dismissed from his position following the coup d'état of general Theodoros Pangalos in June 1925, but was reinstated in September 1926, following the overthrow of the Pangalos dictatorship. He served as Minister for Military Affairs in the 1926–1928 Alexandros Zaimis cabinets, and in September 1928 he was elected a member of the Academy of Athens for his historical studies. He was appointed as Inspector General of Military Schools in March 1929 and soon after again as Chief of the Army General Staff, occupying the post until June 1931.

In the March 1933 emergency cabinet of Lt. General Alexandros Othonaios, Mazarakis occupied the portfolio of National Education, as well as, as interim holder, of Foreign Affairs (6/7 March) and Aviation (9/10 March). In 1935, following the outbreak of a pro-Venizelist coup attempt, he was suspended from active service, and finally retired in 1937 due to the age limit. In the same year, he served as president of the Academy of Athens.

=== Later life ===
Following the suicide of Prime Minister Alexandros Koryzis on 18 April 1941, amidst the German invasion of Greece, King George II of Greece gave Mazarakis the mandate to form a new government. The latter refused to formally accept before being briefed on the military situation in Epirus, and on the 20th returned the mandate to the King, both due to the rapid German advance, as well as due to his refusal to form a government with the widely loathed security minister of the Metaxas Regime, Konstantinos Maniadakis.

Mazarakis died in Athens in 1943. He was married but childless.

== Sources ==
- Koliopoulos, Ioannis S. (1976–1977). "Η στρατιωτική και πολιτική κρίση στην Ελλάδα τον Απρίλιο του 1941" [The Military and Political Crisis in Greece in April 1941] (PDF). Μνήμων (in Greek). 6: 53–74. doi:10.12681/mnimon.174.
- Mazarakis-Ainian, Alexandros (1948). Απομνημονεύματα [Memoirs] (in Greek). Athens: Ikaros.

Political offices
Preceded by Georgios Kondylis	Minister for Military Affairs of Greece; 4 December 1926 – 4 July 1928	Succeeded by Themistoklis Sofoulis
Preceded by Alexandros Mylonas	Minister for National Education and Religious Affairs of Greece; 6–10 March 1933	Succeeded by Petros Rallis
Military offices
Preceded by Major General Petros Klados	Chief of the Hellenic Army General Staff; 1924 – June 1925	Succeeded by Major General Ptolemaios Sarigiannis
Preceded by Major General Ptolemaios Sarigiannis	Chief of the Hellenic Army General Staff; 1 September 1926 – 1927	Succeeded by Lt General Nikolaos Vlachopoulos
Preceded by Major General Alexandros Merentitis	Chief of the Hellenic Army General Staff; 17 October 1929 – June 1931	Succeeded by Lt General Konstantinos Manetas
