= Nikolaos Rokas =

Greek soldier

Lieutenant General Nikolaos Rokas DSM
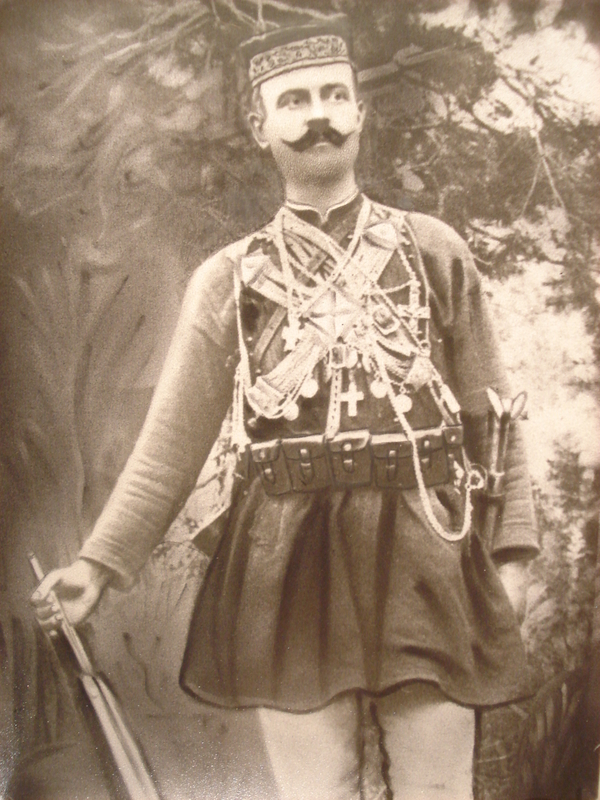
- Rokas during the Macedonian Struggle.
- Native name: Νικόλαος Ρόκας
- Nickname: Kapetan Kolios (Καπετάν Κολιός)
- Born: c. 1869; Mandra, Kingdom of Greece
- Died: 1947 Athens, Kingdom of Greece
- Allegiance: Kingdom of Greece; Cretan State; Second Hellenic Republic
- Branch: Hellenic Army
- Service years: 1887-1922; 1927-1929; 1940-1941
- Rank: Lieutenant General
- Commands: 16th Infantry Regiment; 1st Infantry Regiment; 31st Infantry Regiment; 31st Infantry Regiment; 5th Infantry Division; Alexandroupoli Military Command
- Conflicts: Greco-Turkish War (1897); Macedonian Struggle; Balkan Wars; First Balkan War; Second Balkan War; Northern Epirote Struggle; World War I; Macedonian Front; Russian Civil War; Allied intervention in the Russian Civil War; Southern Front; Southern Russia Intervention; Greco-Turkish War (1919-1922); World War II; Greco-Italian War; German invasion of Greece
- Awards: Gold Cross of the Order of the Redeemer; Commander of the Order of the Phoenix; Gold Cross of Valour; War Cross; Distinguished Service Medal; Legion of Honour; Croix de Guerre

Nikolaos Rokas (Greek: Νικόλαος Ρόκας) was a Greek soldier who participated in almost all Greek conflicts of the first half of the 20th century and ultimately rose to the rank of lieutenant general.

== Career ==
Nikolaos Rokas was born in Mandra, near Elefsis, in about 1869. He enlisted in the Hellenic Army as a volunteer on 9 January 1887, was named sergeant after studies in the NCO preparatory school, and fought in the Greco-Turkish War of 1897. After further studies in the non-commissioned officer academy, he was commissioned as a second lieutenant on 29 August 1902.

In 1905–1907, he went to Ottoman-ruled Macedonia as a leader of an armed band during the Macedonian Struggle. He assumed the nom de guerre of Kapetan Kolios (Καπετάν Κολιός), and operated in the area of Mount Olympus and Vodena and Naousa. After returning to Greece in 1907, he was sent to the autonomous Cretan State to organize its military forces. He participated in the Balkan Wars of 1912–1913 as a lieutenant and company commander. Promoted to captain, he led a battalion in Northern Epirus. He fought in the Macedonian front of World War I as commander of the 16th Infantry Regiment on the River Strymon sector. He then led the 16th and the 1st Infantry Regiments in the Greek participation in the Southern Russia intervention.

During the subsequent Asia Minor Campaign he led the 31st Infantry Regiment in 1921, followed by the 33rd Infantry Regiment, and finally by the 5th Infantry Division at the time of the collapse of the Greek front in August 1922. After the Greek defeat, he was dismissed from the army, but was rehabilitated in June 1927, receiving a promotion to major general. He was promoted to lieutenant general and retired in 1929.

On the outbreak of the Greco-Italian War in 1940, he was recalled to active service and appointed head of the Alexandroupoli Military Command.

He died at Athens in 1947.

== Awards ==
Nikolaos Rokas was awarded the Gold Cross of the Order of the Redeemer and made Commander of the Order of the Phoenix. He also received Greece's highest award for gallantry, the Gold Cross of Valour, several times, along with the Greek War Cross. Additionally, he was a recipient of several foreign awards: the British Distinguished Service Medal, the French Legion of Honour and Croix de Guerre, and the Serbian War Cross.
