= Thrasyvoulos Tsakalotos =

Greek general and diplomat (1897–1989)

- Θρασύβουλος Τσακαλώτος
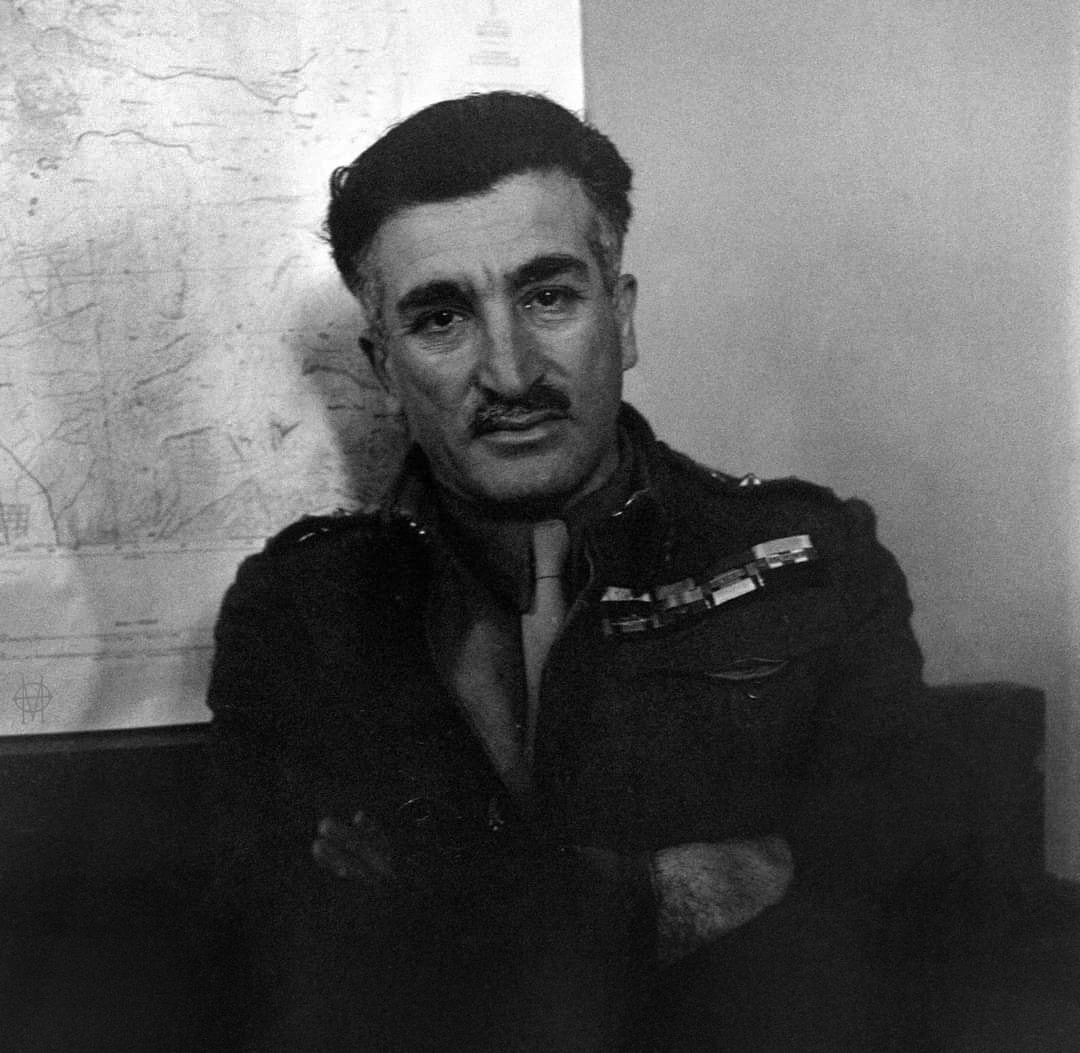
- Thrasyvoulos Tsakalotos in Athens c. 1944
- Born: 3 April 1897; Preveza, Janina Vilayet, Ottoman Empire (now Greece)
- Died: 15 August 1989 (aged 92); Athens, Third Hellenic Republic
- Alma mater: Hellenic Military Academy
- Military career
- Allegiance: Kingdom of Greece; Second Hellenic Republic
- Branch: Hellenic Army
- Service years: 1913–1952
- Rank: Lieutenant General
- Commands: 3/40 Evzone Regiment (1940–41); 3rd Greek Mountain Brigade (1944–45); I Army Corps (1948); II Army Corps (1948–49); Chief of the Hellenic Army General Staff (1951–52)
- Conflicts: World War I; Macedonian front; Greco-Turkish War (1919–1922); World War II; Greco-Italian War; Battle of Greece; Italian campaign; Battle of Rimini; Greek Civil War; Dekemvriana; Operation Koronis; Operation Peristera; Operation Pyrsos
- Awards: Gold Cross of Valour
- Other work: Greek Ambassador to Yugoslavia

Thrasyvoulos Tsakalotos (Greek: Θρασύβουλος Τσακαλώτος; 3 April 1897 – 15 August 1989) was a distinguished Hellenic Army Lieutenant General who served in World War I, the Greco-Turkish War of 1919–1922, World War II and the Greek Civil War, rising to become Chief of the Hellenic Army General Staff. He also served as Greece's Ambassador to Yugoslavia.

== Early life ==
Tsakalotos was born in Preveza in 1897, at a time when it was still a province of the Ottoman Empire. At the age of thirteen, he went to Alexandria, to make the acquaintance of a cousin who lived there.

== Military career ==
He entered the Hellenic Military Academy in 1913 and graduated from it as an Infantry 2nd Lieutenant on 1 October 1916. He fought at the Macedonian front of World War I, being promoted to Lieutenant in 1917, as well as in the Asia Minor Campaign, being promoted to captain in 1920.

In the interwar period he held various staff appointments and commands, as well as a teaching post in the Superior War Academy. He was promoted to major in 1924, Lt Colonel in 1930 and colonel in 1938.

=== World War II ===
During the Greco-Italian War, he commanded the 3/40 Evzone Regiment (initially as part of the 8th Infantry Division and after 27 November under the 3rd Infantry Division), until he was appointed Chief of Staff of II Army Corps on 22 March 1941, shortly before the German attack and occupation of Greece. In 1942, he escaped occupied Greece and reached Egypt, where the Greek government in exile resided. There he was placed in charge of the Ismaïlia training centre, before assuming command of the newly formed 3rd Greek Mountain Brigade in April 1944. He led his brigade during the Gothic Line offensive in Italy, including the Battle of Rimini.

After the liberation of Greece from the Axis, he was transferred with the 3rd Greek Mountain Brigade in Athens. A strong anticommunist, he did not obey to orders by the pro-EAM minister Ptolemaios Sarigiannis to leave the center of the city with his men and disagreed with the British General Ronald Scobie on a possible evacuation of the city. With his men he participated in the Dekemvriana clashes against the pro-communist EAM-ELAS in Athens during December 1944.

=== Greek Civil War ===
On 24 March 1945 he was appointed commander of the 2nd Infantry Division. In the next year he was placed as the head of the Superior War Academy and promoted to major general.

An able officer, he rose quickly: commander of III Army Corps in 1946, he was appointed Assistant Deputy Chief of the Army General Staff in 1947, then promoted to lieutenant general and given command of I Army Corps and then II Army Corps in 1948. He played a major role in the victory of the Hellenic Army in the Greek Civil War, leading the pacification of western Epirus in July–August 1948, and helped stabilize the situation at the Battle of Vitsi in October, before initiating the operations for the final suppression of Communist guerrilla activity in the Peloponnese in December. After the Communists captured Karpenisi, Tsakalotos led the task force sent to pursue them; and he defended Arta from capture. Finally, he led the final charge against the communist stronghold at Mount Grammos during the decisive Operation Pyrsos in 1949.

His personality led to strained relations with his superior, Alexander Papagos; the British officer Christopher Woodhouse, who had been active in the Greek Resistance and knew both, wrote of the relationship between Papagos and Tsakalotos: "The disharmony between Papagos and Tsakalotos was rather like that between Eisenhower and Montgomery in the Second World War. [...] Tsakalotos was a brilliant field commander, egoistic and impetuous, always convinced that the crux of any strategic problem was where he happened to be in command. Papagos was a superlative staff officer, impeccable in logistic planning and exact calculation, a master of the politics and diplomacy of war, with little experience of high command in battle."

=== Later career ===
From 31 May 1951 until 20 November 1952, he served as chief of the Army General Staff. Shortly before, Papagos had announced that he was resigning to pursue politics after a clash with King Paul. The king directed Tsakalotos to arrest Papagos, but Tsakalotos refused to carry out the order.

== Diplomatic career ==
In 1957–1960, Tsakalotos also served as Greece's ambassador to Yugoslavia. In April 1967, following the fall of Ioannis Paraskevopoulos' government, Tsakalotos was suggested to Andreas Papandreou as the possible head of a national unity government. Papandreou suspected the proposal had come from the king, but he dismissed the idea as Tsakalotos did not have the support of the "democratic camp" and because he believed a national unity government at that time was unacceptable. Following the Metapolitefsi of 1974, Tsakalotos became a supporter of Andreas Papandreou and the Panhellenic Socialist Movement (PASOK); in the elections of 1985 he published a statement encouraging people to vote for PASOK and saying that he felt Andreas was like a brother to him.

On 23 March 1984, as a symbolic gesture of reconciliation and healing of the divisions caused by the Civil War, Tsakalotos publicly met and shook hands with his erstwhile adversary, Markos Vafiades, the commander of the Communist forces.

Thrasyvoulos Tsakalotos died in Athens on 15 August 1989.

== Personal life ==
Tsakalotos' first cousin's grandson, or first cousin twice-removed, Euclid Tsakalotos, is a New Left MP and served as Minister of Finance in Alex Tsipras' second cabinet.

== Works ==
- Tα Γιάννενα ως ακατάβλητος δύναμις εις τρεις ιστορικούς σταθμούς τoυ αγώνος του Ελληνικού 'Eθνους, τυπ. Α. Ι. Βάρτσου, Αθήναι 1956 (από ομιλία για την επέτειο της απελευθέρωσης των Ιωαννίνων; Ioannina as an indomitable power in three historical instances of the struggle of the Greek Nation, from speeches on the anniversary of the liberation of Ioannina).
- 40 χρονια στρατιώτης της Ελλάδος : πώς εκερδίσαμε τους αγώνας μας 1940-1949, τυπ. Ακροπόλεως, Αθήναι 1960 (Forty years a soldier of Greece: how we won the struggles of 1940-49).
- Δεκέμβρης 1944 : Η μάχη των Αθηνών, Αθήνα 1969 (December 1944: The Battle of Athens).
- Γράμμος, Αθήνα 1970 (Grammos).
- Η μάχη των ολίγων, Αθήνα 1971 (The battle of the few).

== Sources ==
- Συνοπτική Ιστορία του Γενικού Επιτελείου Στρατού 1901–2001 [A Concise History of the Hellenic Army General Staff 1901–2001] (in Greek). Athens: Hellenic Army History Directorate. 2001. ISBN 960-7897-44-7.
- Close, David H.; Veremis, Thanos (1993). "The Military Struggle, 1945–9". In Close, David H. (ed.). The Greek Civil War, 1943-1950: Studies of Polarization. London: Routledge. pp. 97–128. ISBN 9780415021128.
- Woodhouse, Christopher Montague (2002). The struggle for Greece, 1941–1949. C. Hurst & Co. Publishers. ISBN 978-1-85065-487-2.
