= Aganice Ainianos =

Greek poet

Aganice Ainianos (Greek: Αγανίκη Αινιάνος Μαζαράκη; 1838–1892) was a Greek poet.

== Biography ==
Ainianos was born in Athens in 1838. Her father was the Greek politician George Ainian (1788–1848), a founder of the secret society Filiki Eteria. She was orphaned at an early age and was raised by her uncle, Dimitrios Ainian, who was involved in the uprising against King Otto of Greece. They were forced to flee to the mountains and lived in hiding. During her childhood, she studied French, painting, and the Classics. She returned to live with her relatives in Athens, studying mathematics at the Arsakeio and graduating at the age of 17. She then studied ancient Greek writers, French poets and prose writers. She married Ioannis Mazarakis in Kythnos in 1860. Her children were Konstantinos Mazarakis-Ainian (b. 1869), Alexandros Mazarakis-Ainian (b. 1874), and Philippos Mazarakis-Ainian.

Ainianos composed poetry for herself. Her experience living in the countryside provided context for her poetry, especially her poems about impoverished working women, nature, and beauty. She wrote in the Greek vernacular rather than Katharevousa and her style revealed a sense of realism, free of the age's pseudo-romanticism.

Ainianos died in 1892. Her works were not published before her death.
