= Battle of Rimini (1944) =

Battle during the Italian Campaign of the Second World War

- Part of the Gothic Line Offensive during the Italian campaign of World War II
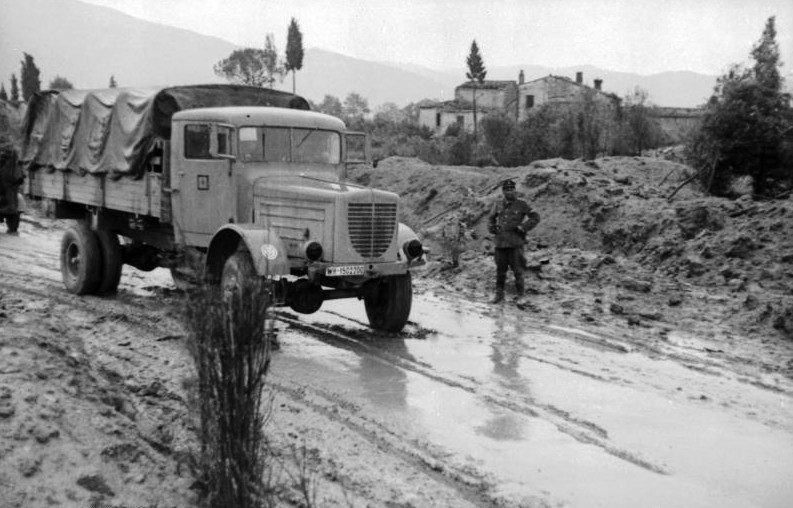
- German trucks driving through muddy, flooded and unpaved roads near Rimini; typical terrain encountered during the offensive.
Date	13–21 September 1944
Location	Rimini, Italy 44°03′34″N 12°34′06″E
Result	Allied victory

Belligerents
Canada; Greece; New Zealand	Germany

Commanders and leaders
(Canada) E. L. M. Burns (Kingdom of Greece) Thrasyvoulos Tsakalotos	(Nazi Germany) Traugott Herr

Units involved
(Canada) 1st Infantry Division (Dominion of New Zealand) 2nd Infantry Division (Kingdom of Greece) 3rd Mountain Brigade	(Nazi Germany) 1st Fallschirmjäger Regiment; Turkestan Legion
- Military casualties on both sides are estimated to be about 12.000. Source:https://scopririmini.it/en/italys-biggest-battle-was-fought-in-rimini-and-almost-nobody-knows-it/

The Battle of Rimini took place between 13 and 21 September 1944 during Operation Olive, the main Allied offensive on the Gothic Line in August and September 1944, part of the Italian Campaign in the Second World War. Rimini, a city on Italy's Adriatic coast, anchored the Rimini Line, a German defensive line which was the third such line of the Gothic Line defences.

Rimini, which had been hit previously by 373 air raids, had 1,470,000 rounds fired against it by Allied land forces; by the end of the battle, only 2% of all buildings in the city escaped damage.

== Background ==
=== Rimini during the Second World War ===
Rimini is located in a militarily strategic position, at the southern tip of the Po Valley, at a narrow passage along the Adriatic coast where the plains of northern Italy meet the mountainous terrain of central Italy.

Before the Battle of Rimini, Rimini had suffered sustained Allied aerial bombardment since November 1943. Many refugees from northern Italy had fled to Rimini between November 1942 and February 1943, only to flee again with the bombings. Of 40,000 inhabitants, only 3,000 remained, and the city centre was deserted. Around 55,000 refugees fled to the north, to the hinterland, and to the independent Republic of San Marino, where they sheltered in the country's railway tunnels. As the Allied frontline approached the city, naval bombardment followed, and remaining citizens hid in makeshift shelters or in the caves by the Covignano hill. Partisan resistance was also notable in Rimini, with official reports of 400 young people involved in resistance cells. On 16 August 1944, three partisans were hanged in Rimini's central square, which would later be renamed in their honour.

Between November 1943 and September 1944, the total number of air, naval, and land bombings in the city numbered 396, destroying 82% of all buildings, the highest figure among Italian cities with over 50,000 inhabitants.

=== The Gothic Line ===
On 25 August 1944 the Eighth Army launched Operation Olive, attacking on a three Corps front up the eastern flank of Italy into the Gothic Line defences. By the first week in September, the offensive had broken through the forward defences of the Gothic Line and the defensive positions of the Green I line and United States Fifth Army entered the offensive in central Italy attacking towards Bologna.

In the Eighth Army's centre, the 1st Canadian Division had broken through Green II on the right of its front advancing to pinch out the Polish Corps on the very right of the army (and allowing the latter to be withdrawn to army reserve) but inland in the hills, the Corps' advance had been held up by stubborn defence at Coriano and V Corps on the army's left flank had been halted at Croce and Gemmano. A new attack to clear the Green II positions in the hills and destroy the Rimini Line running from the port of Rimini inland to San Marino was scheduled to start on 12 September.

== Prelude ==
=== Arrival of the front in Riccione ===
In Riccione, a sizeable town southeast of Rimini, from the evening of 2 September, the Germans retreated to a defensive line at the Rio Melo, defended by a single tank, allowing forces of the 1st Canadian Division to enter the town. The area between Viale Ceccarini, Riccione's principal high street, and the Rio Melo, a river lined with a port, became a no man's land until the Battle of Rimini had finished. The Hotel Adria, no longer extant, was requisitioned for soldiers engaged in the Battle of Rimini to take four days' leave on the beach.

Behind the Canadian Division was the 3rd Greek Mountain Brigade (Greek: ΙΙΙ Ελληνική Ορεινή Ταξιαρχία). On 8 and 10 September, near the village of Cattolica, the Greeks pushed back two German attacks.

=== 3–12 September: Battle of San Lorenzo in Strada ===
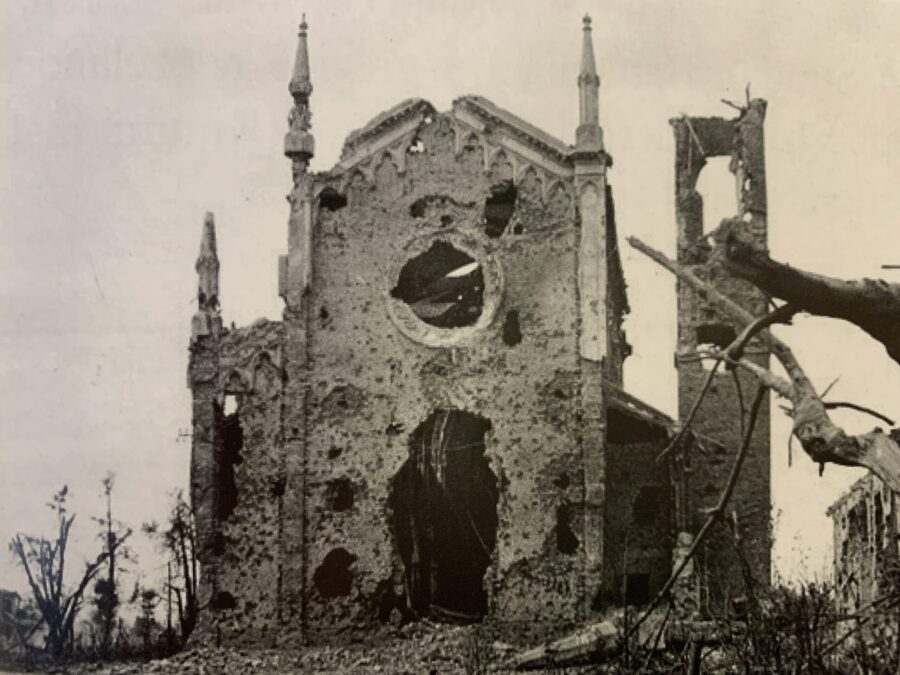
The Church of San Lorenzo in Strada in Riccione after the battle, c. 1944

To Riccione's northwest, the ancient town of San Lorenzo in Strada was heavily fortified by General Richard Heidrich's 1st Parachute Division, who barricaded themselves in the church with instructions to fight until the end. San Lorenzo sat on a hilltop along a curve in the Via Flaminia before Rimini airfield, and was therefore strategically important.

On 3 September, the 1st Parachute Division engaged the Canadians, who had reached Riccione's southern outskirt of Abyssinia. The battle in San Lorenzo, which included sword-fighting in the church, claimed 31 soldiers and 124 wounded or missing, with the Canadians reduced to 18 men before they suspended their attack on 6 September.

By 12 September, the Greeks had joined the Canadians in Riccione, with orders to lead the right flank during the Canadians' offensive on Rimini. The Greeks were notorious for their poor behaviour towards locals and consequently ordered not to pass underneath the railway that bisected Riccione. On the night of 12–13 September, a second attack on San Lorenzo, supported by the 3rd Greek Battalion and the 20th New Zealand Armoured Regiment, claimed the church after four and a half hours. The church was destroyed.

== Battle ==
=== 13–14 September: Battle of Monaldini and Monticelli ===
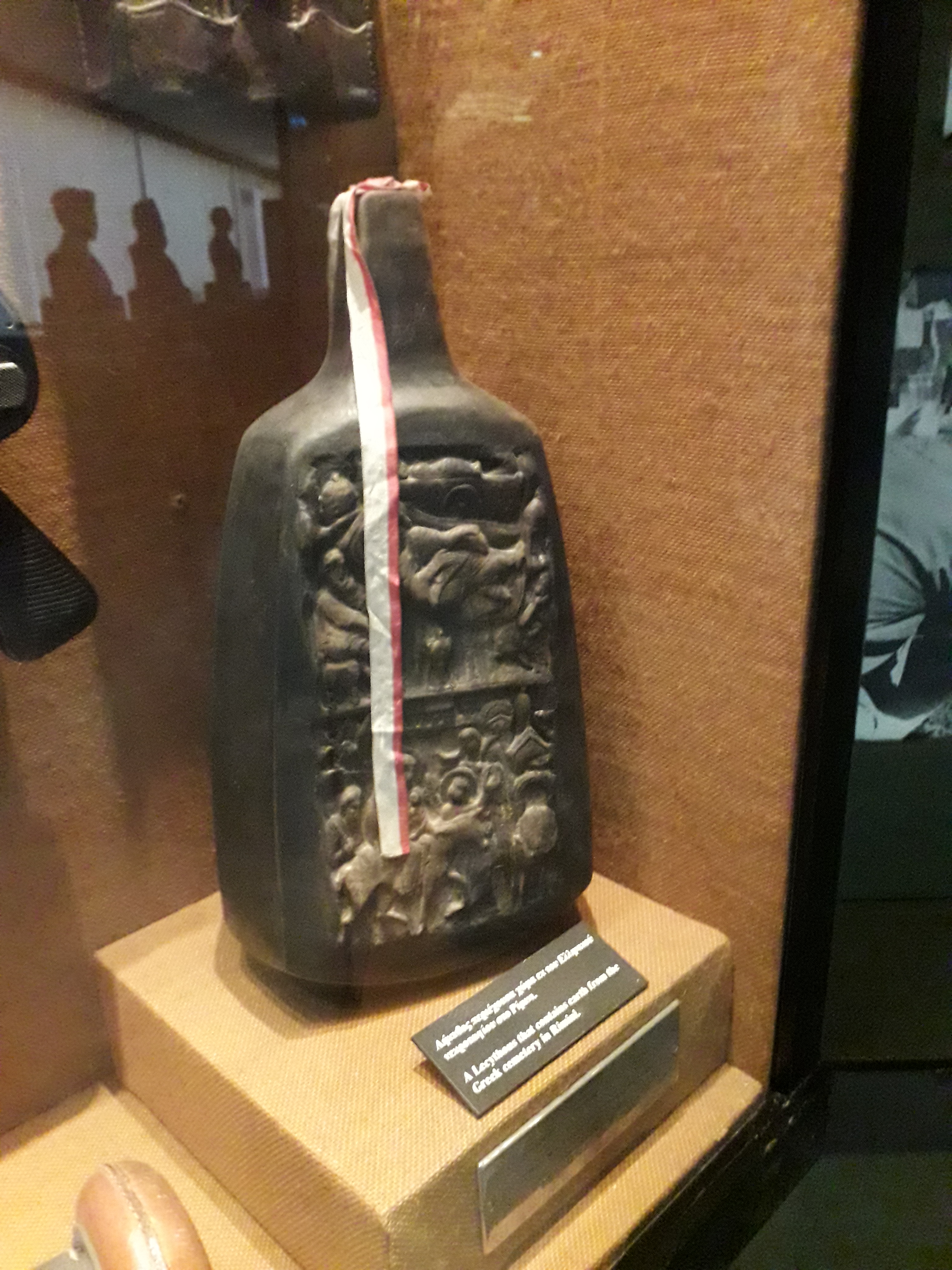
A lecythus in Athens War Museum containing ground from the Hellenic Military Cemetery in Riccione

On 13 September, the 3rd Greek Mountain Brigade, supported by the combined armour and infantry of the B squadron of the 20th New Zealand Armoured Regiment and the 22nd Motor Battalion from the 2nd New Zealand Division, launched an attack to take Rimini. Supporting the brigade were infantry, mortars and machine guns from the Canadian Saskatoon Light Infantry, and 33 17pdr guns from New Zealand.

Initially, the Greeks attacked Monaldini and Monticelli, two small agricultural hamlets about 500 metres (1,600 feet) southwest of San Lorenzo. The settlements were defended by the 1st Parachute Division and some Osttruppen described as Turkomen (likely a Turkestani Ostlegion battalion from the 162nd Turkoman Division). The Germans were well prepared and held off the Greeks, who lost almost one hundred troops, more than a third of the troops engaged since the beginning of the action.

During the night of 13–14 September, the 1st Canadian Brigade gathered on the southern bank of the Marano Stream, north of San Lorenzo in Strada. The Greeks launched a night attack at 02:00, supported by the 3rd Canadian Brigade, followed by the 1st Canadian Brigade at 06:30.

On 14 September, 7 and 8 troops of the B Squadron were added to the attack on Monaldini. Soon after, a platoon from 22nd Motor Battalion aided the attack on Monticelli with the support of 5 and 6 Troops' Sherman tanks. By 20:00, Monaldini had been taken with only light casualties. The Greek and New Zealand forces turned to Monticelli, but the German defenders abandoned the settlement as soon as they approached.

=== 15–17 September: Battle of Rimini Airfield ===
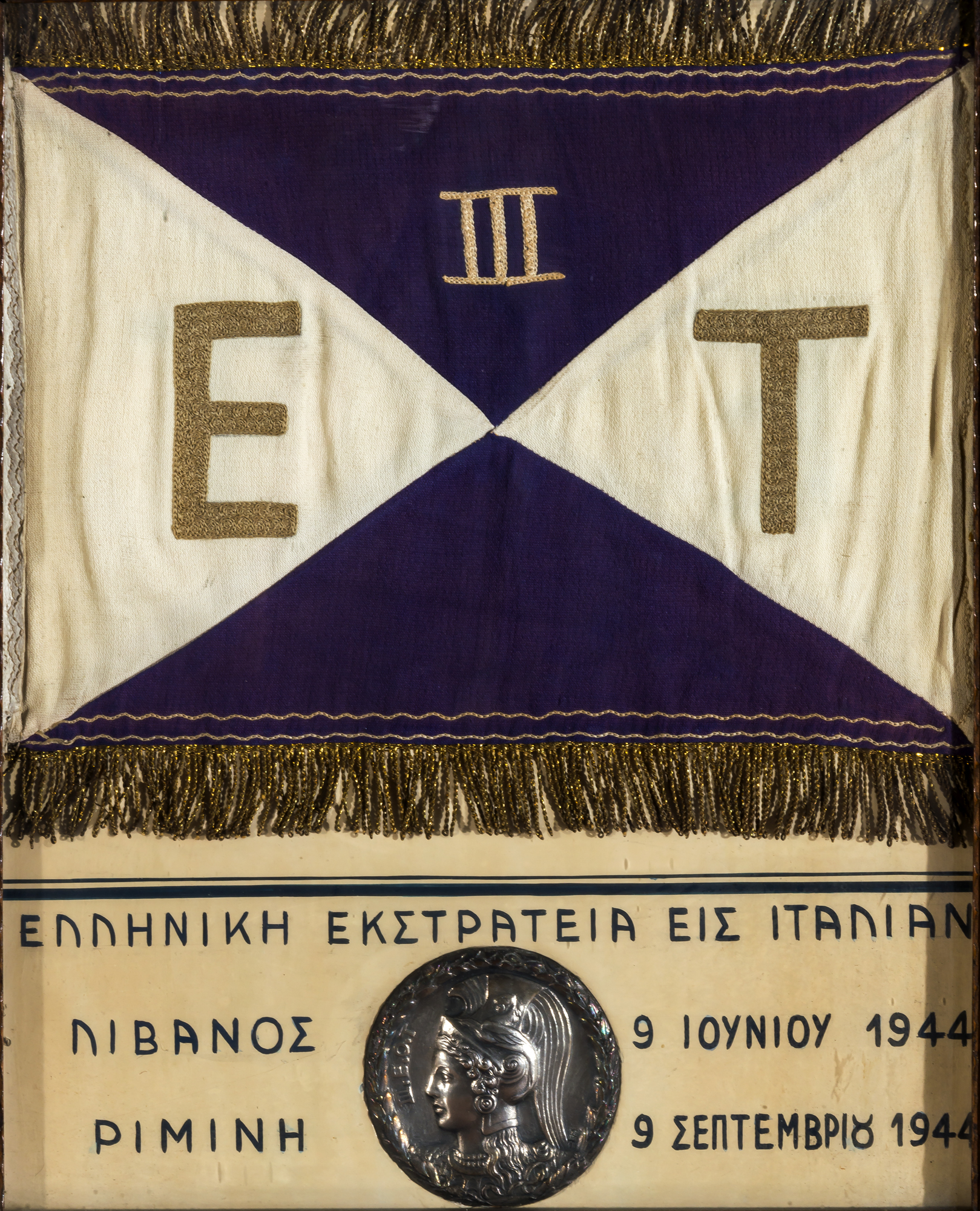
Banner of the 3rd Greek Mountain Brigade commemorating the battle of Rimini (Athens War Museum)

On 15 September, the Greeks launched an assault on Rimini airfield, west of the village of Miramare. The airfield had been used as a prisoner-of-war camp for captured Allied soldiers.

At 10:00, the 1st Greek Battalion crossed the Marano Stream at the southern end of the airfield, and immediately came under intense fire from German positions around the airfield. The Greeks halted to reorganise themselves for an attack. C Squadron of the 18th New Zealand Armoured Regiment relieved B Squadron 20th Armoured Regiment in the line supporting the Greeks. After requesting air support, Allied fighter and bomber planes attacked the western side of the airfield, and the Greeks attacked shortly afterwards.

The 1st Greek Battalion, which attacked the airfield, was heavily resisted. Fire from the airfield inflicted heavy casualties on the advancing Greeks; however, support from the New Zealand tanks and infantry was well-coordinated as one of the New Zealand officers spoke Greek. The tanks fired on each house lining the south of the airfield to ensure that they were not occupied. As the Greeks and New Zealanders approached the defensive positions, they came under fire from infantry, Panzerschreck anti-tank rockets, self-propelled guns, and emplaced Panther turrets. The heavy fire pinned the advance just short of the airfield. Meanwhile, the tanks edged around a hedgerow to avoid the anti-tank fire, but soon found themselves at the forefront of the attack. A German self-propelled gun knocked out a Sherman, but the New Zealanders continued forward and knocked out enemy positions with high-explosives and grenades, forcing the Germans to withdraw from their positions. The crew of a Panther turret abandoned it during the night.

Separately, the 2nd Greek Battalion, to the right of the 1st Greek Battalion, attacked up the Via Flaminia, but became separated from their supporting New Zealand tanks. The Greeks were halted by mines and heavy defensive fire from the eastern side of the airfield and nearby houses.

On the left flank, the 3rd Greek Battalion attacked the hamlet of Casalecchio, a crossroads with a few houses and a church, supported by New Zealand tanks and infantry. The Greeks quickly cleared the houses, but the church was defended by paratroops. A combined attack by Greek and New Zealand infantry and tanks drove the paratroopers out. Heavy machine-gun and mortar fire from the airfield halted any further advance.

On 16 September, the Greeks continued to mop up around the airfield, most of which they held, though one Panther turret was still in operation. The 3rd Greek Battalion advanced up the left through the hedges and ditches beyond Casalecchio until they came level with the 1st Greek Battalion in the centre. They were under constant fire and had to clear several landmines. On the right flank, the 2nd Greek Battalion advanced. Anti-tank fire was lighter than the previous day.

On 17 September, the three Greek battalions continued their advance. Several attempts were made to knock out the remaining Panther turret with aircraft and artillery, but it finally fell to one of the New Zealand Shermans working around its flank. It fired several anti-tank rounds into the turret before the crew eventually evacuated. With the airfield was taken, the 3rd Greek Mountain Brigade turned its attention towards Rimini itself.

=== 18–20 September: Approaching Rimini ===
With the airfield captured, the offensive to retake Rimini began in earnest on 18 September. The 2nd and 3rd Battalions pushed towards Rimini from the southeast. Supported by the New Zealand regiments, they encountered heavy resistance once again from the German paratroops. Meanwhile, to the southwest, the 1st Canadian Division was contesting the area of San Fortunato, on the Covignano hill overlooking Rimini, with over a million artillery strikes on the hill alone. The Canadian attack, which had broken the German defence by the morning of 20 September, threatened the defending forces with being outflanked. Despite the Queen's Bays' armoured column being destroyed at Montecieco, the German troops were forced to retreat to Vergiano and the Marecchia river, chased also by the Indian divisions returning from the Battle of San Marino.

By 16:30 on 20 September, the battalions were in the southern outskirts of Rimini, with the 2nd Greek Battalion having captured the Church of Colonnella. Rimini had been the site of 700 artillery strikes and 486 aerial raids, and 90% of its buildings had been razed. Albert Kesselring, in charge of the German defence in Italy, suggested that soldiers defend the city to exert maximum damage on the attacking forces. General Heinrich von Vietinghoff established a defensive line north of the Marecchia river, and persuaded Kesselring, also in light of a heavy rain that evening that began at 18:00, that any unsupported defence of the city would not last long. At 19:30, the German forces were ordered to retreat overnight.

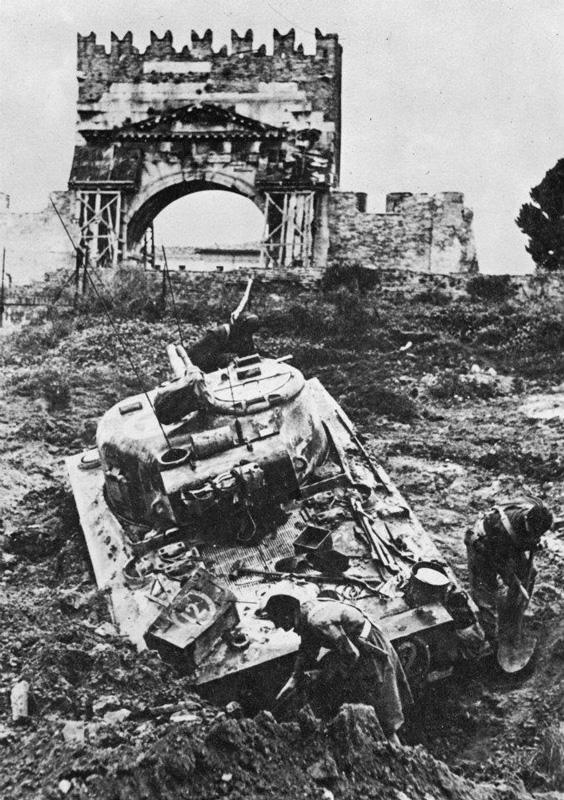
A tank in front of Rimini's Arch of Augustus in 1944

To slow down the Allied advance, buildings were demolished at street corners, alongside most bridges over the Marecchia River. Marshal Willi Trageser of the 2nd Parachute Division was charged with destroying both the Arch of Augustus and the Ponte di Tiberio, Rimini's definining Augustan monuments at either end of its decumanus maximus. Trageser defied Lieutenant Kenneth Renberg's orders to demolish the arch, saying after the war:

I personally gave the order not to blow up the arch, taking full responsibility for it. It seemed absurd to me to destroy a historical monument of this kind to achieve no result, given that the arch was isolated in the middle of a square and, therefore, traffic could have continued perfectly well, both to the right and left of the monument itself.

— Marshal Willi Trageser

As for the Ponte di Tiberio, Trageser reported to his command that "the bridge had blown", when instead, according to Trageser, several attempts to detonate the bridge had failed, leading to minimal damage. Trageser was using low-quality ammonal, laid in 100 kilograms (220 pounds) at the bridge's base and 160 kilograms (350 pounds) across eight charges under the road surface. Only two charges exploded, which Trageser attributed to a crossing of wires along the bridge's gutter, causing small exploisons. The ammonal was also likely weakened by rain. Colonel Horst Pretzell and Lieutenant Colonel Rudolf Rennecke later said that the German high command had ordered the bridge to be spared, though the order was not communicated to the evacuating troops. In any case, the Marecchia had flooded after heavy rainfall during the overnight retreat on 20–21 September 1944. Trageser's account was accepted by the German high command. According to the post-war account of a soldier involved in the detonations, the poor wire connections were intended by Trageser. The Ponte di Tiberio was the only bridge not to be destroyed along the Marecchia during the German retreat. On 29 January 1957, during road maintenance works, undetonated sticks of ammonal were found on the bridge, which was temporarily closed to ensure their safe removal.

=== 21 September: Capture of Rimini ===
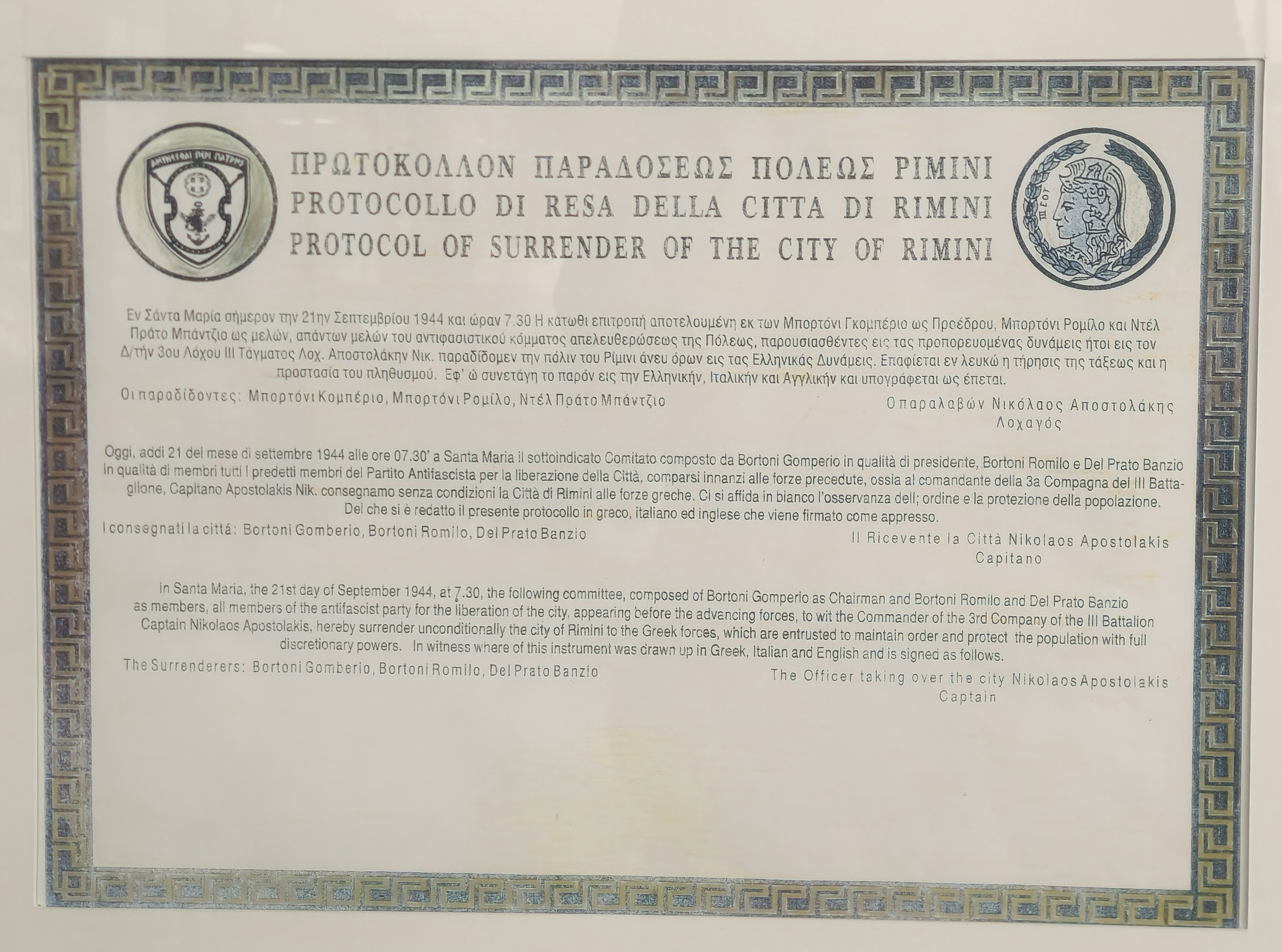
Protocol of surrender of the city of Rimini - Athens War Museum

On the morning of 21 September, the 2nd Greek Battalion advanced towards the bridge over the Ausa in front of Rimini's city gates. There they met two New Zealand officers scouting for access routes. The battalion passed through the Arch of Augustus into Rimini's city centre. Informed by two inhabitants that the Germans had abandoned the city, they called for New Zealand's tanks to enter the city through Piazza Malatesta and then Piazza Cavour. The Canadians, attacking from the west, reached the Bridge of Tiberius before the Greeks. Rimini was effectively a ghost town, with few inhabitants remaining.

The Greeks raised the flag on the balcony of the city hall. At 07:45 on 21 September, the mayor unconditionally surrendered the city to the 3rd Greek Mountain Brigade with an official protocol written in Greek, English, and Italian. A ceremony was held in the afternoon, in the presence of the participating allied brigades. By the evening, the Canadian flag joined the Greek flag over the city hall.

== Legacy ==
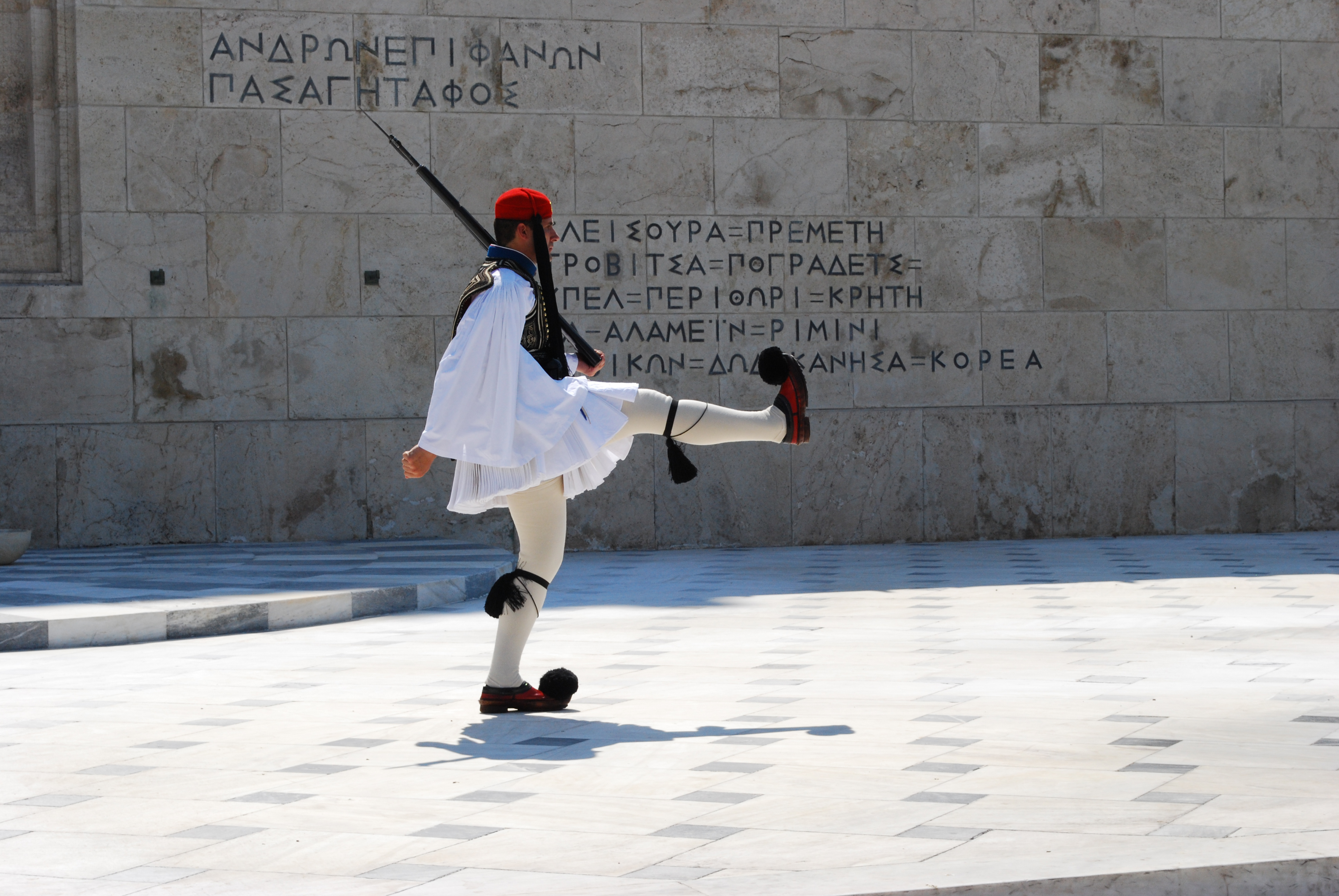
The Tomb of the Unknown Soldier in Athens. The inscription "ΡΙΜΙΝΙ" can be seen in the stone carved text right above the guard's foot.

After the war, the 3rd Greek Mountain Brigade was called by the honorific title "Rimini Brigade" ("Ταξιαρχία Ρίμινι"). 114 Greek soldiers are buried in a cemetery in Riccione's Fontanelle area, along the Via Flaminia. Gothic Line historian Amedeo Montemaggi suggested that the Allied command had assigned the Battle of Rimini to the provisional Greek government, who had asked for a prestigious military result, because of its feasibility and the city's proximity to the Rubicon, made famous by Julius Caesar's crossing, lending the battle a historical-cultural importance. In local memory, neither the Greeks nor the Canadians were remembered fondly for their treatment of the local population, with a local Romagnol saying: i n'era tendri (they weren't tender).

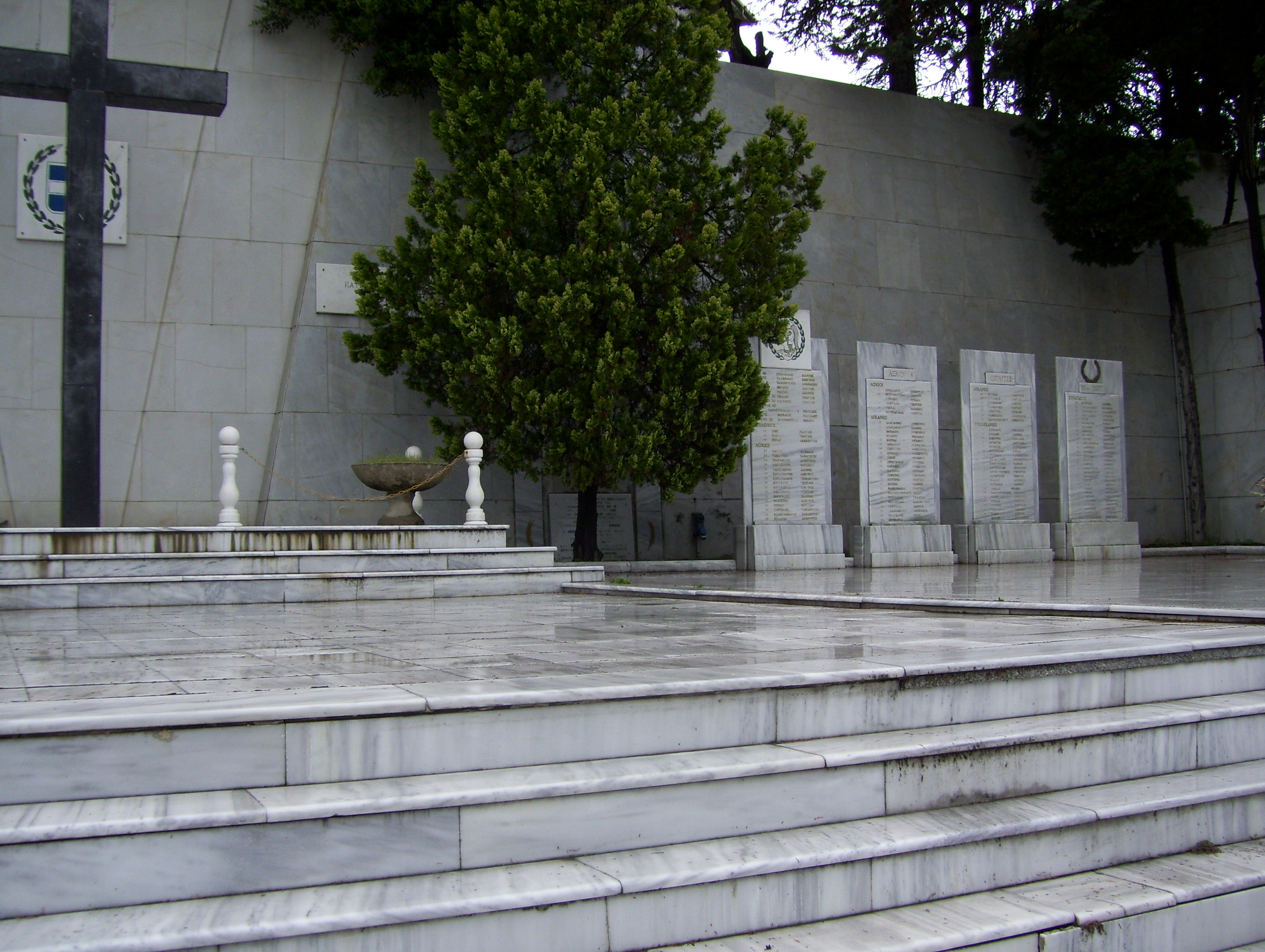
The Hellenic Military Cemetery in Riccione, January 2006

Oliver Leese, the commander of the Eighth Army, which was engaged in the nearby Battle of Coriano, called the battle to take Rimini "one of the hardest battles of the Eighth Army ... comparable to El Alamein, Mareth, and the Gustav Line (Monte Cassino)". 6,668 civilian and military fatalities were officially recorded, with over 6,000 injured and missing. Within 37 days of the Battle of Rimini, over 10,000 soldiers had died between the Allied and Axis forces. In Coriano, the Coriano Ridge War Cemetery numbers 1,939 Allied soldiers, of which fifty were buried unidentified. There are also Anglo-Canadian cemeteries in Montecchio (near Vallefoglia; 582 burials) and Gradara (1,192 burials), and an Indian cemetery (618 burials) on the San Marino Highway.

On 16 January 1961, Giovanni Gronchi, President of Italy, gave the city of Rimini the Gold Medal for Civil Valour by presidential decree, with the following motivation:

Faithful to its most noble traditions, [Rimini] suffered stoically the most serious destructions of the war, and took a very valid part in the liberation struggle, attesting, with the sacrifice of numerous of her children, her most pure faith in a better, free, and democratic Italy.
