= Konstantinos Mazarakis-Ainian =

Officer of the Hellenic Army (c. 1869–1949)

Ainian Mazarakis
- Αινιάν Μαζαράκης
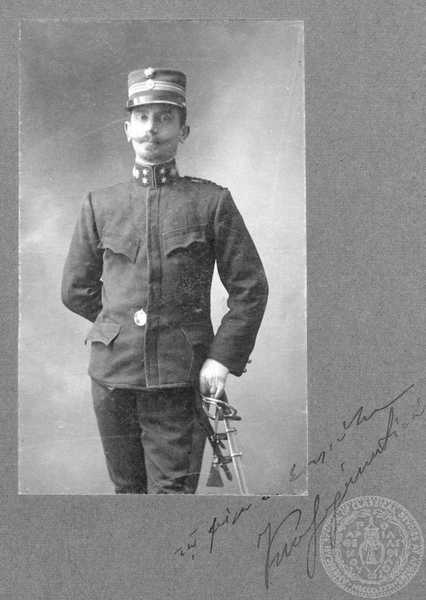
- Mazarakis-Ainian in uniform.
- Born: c. 1869; Kythnos, Kingdom of Greece
- Died: 19 May 1949 (aged 79–80); Athens, Kingdom of Greece
- Education: Hellenic Military Academy
- Relatives: Alexandros Mazarakis-Ainian (brother); Aganice Ainianos (mother); Ioannis Mazarakis-Ainian (son)
- Military career
- Allegiance: Kingdom of Greece; Provisional Government of National Defence; Second Hellenic Republic
- Branch: Hellenic Army
- Service years: 1890–1926
- Rank: Lieutenant General
- Nicknames: Kapetan Akritas; Καπετάν Ακρίτας
- Commands: Xanthi Division
- Wars: Greco-Turkish War of 1897; Battle of Domokos; Macedonian Struggle; Balkan Wars; First Balkan War; Second Balkan War; World War I; Macedonian front (WIA); Greco-Turkish War of 1919–1922; World War II

Konstantinos Mazarakis-Ainian (Greek: Κωνσταντίνος Μαζαράκης-Αινιάν, c. 1869–1949) was a Hellenic Army officer who rose to the rank of Lieutenant General.

== Life ==
Konstantinos Mazarakis-Ainian was born in the island of Kythnos in about 1869. He entered the Hellenic Military Academy and was commissioned a 2nd Lieutenant of Artillery in 1890. He fought in the Greco-Turkish War of 1897, and led a guerrilla band during the Macedonian Struggle under the nom de guerre of Kapetan Akritas (Καπετάν Ακρίτας). In the Balkan Wars, he led volunteer scout detachments; his units operated in advance and in the flanks of the main army, and played a crucial role in the capture of vital bridges and railways.

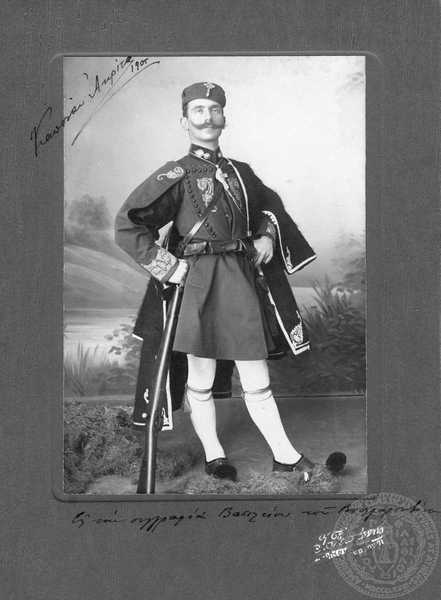
Konstantinos Mazarakis-Ainian c. 1905

By 1916, he was placed in Thessaloniki as the commander of a mountain artillery regiment. He played a major role in the September 1916 coup d'état by the Venizelist "Movement of National Defence", and served as head of the Artillery Directorate in the subsequent National Defence government. In 1918, he was posted to Bern as Greek military attaché to Switzerland. He returned to Greece in 1919 to assume command of the Xanthi Division during the occupation of Western Thrace. In 1920, he led his division to a landing on Bandirma during the Greek offensive against the Kemalists, and shortly after in the occupation of Eastern Thrace, against the local Turkish forces of Cafer Tayyar.

Following the Greek defeat in Anatolia by the Kemalists in August 1922, he chaired the commission of inquiry into the reasons for the defeat. He was promoted to Lieutenant General, and retired from service on 11 October 1926.

He died in 1949.

== Gallery ==
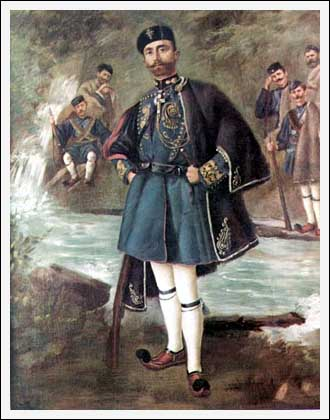
A painting of Konstantinos Mazarakis-Ainian during the Macedonian Struggle.

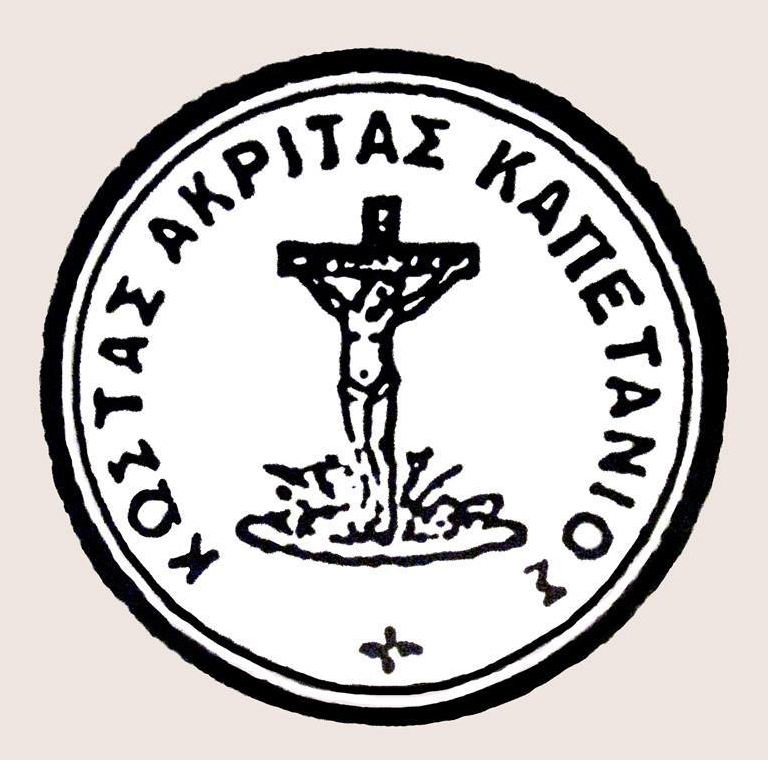
Seal of Konstantinos Mazarakis-Ainian, used during the Macedonian Struggle.

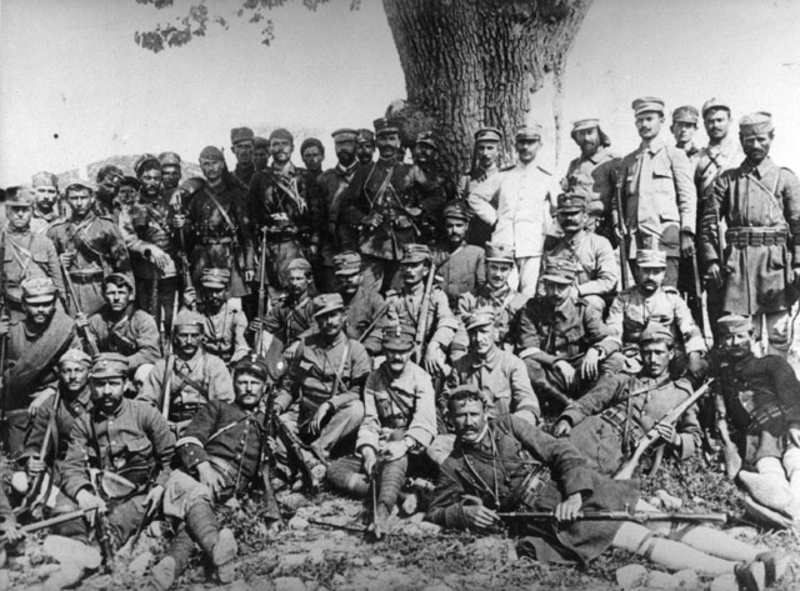
The band of Konstantinos Mazarakis-Ainian.

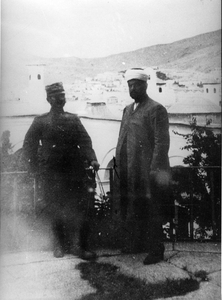
Konstantinos Mazarakis-Ainian and the Mufti of Kavala c. 1913

== Sources ==
- Μεγάλη Στρατιωτική και Ναυτική Εγκυκλοπαιδεία. Τόμος Δ′: Καβάδης – Μωριάς [Great Military and Naval Encyclopedia. Volume IV] (in Greek). Athens. 1929. p. 424.
