= Ioannis Mazarakis-Ainian =

Greek army officer, politician, and historian (1923–2021)

Ioannis Mazarakis-Ainian (Greek: Ιωάννης Μαζαράκης-Αινιάν, 1923 – 19 February 2021) was a Greek army officer, politician, and historian.

== Life ==
Ioannis Mazarakis-Ainian was born in Athens in 1923, the son of Konstantinos Mazarakis-Ainian, a general and guerrilla leader in the Macedonian Struggle.

During the Axis occupation of Greece, he joined the Allied naval intelligence network, before fleeing Greece and joining the 3rd Greek Mountain Brigade as a volunteer. After the liberation of Greece in 1944, he entered the Hellenic Military Academy, graduating (in an expedited course) in 1947 and immediately joined the newly formed Mountain Raiding Companies (LOK), fighting in the ongoing Greek Civil War. For his military service, he received Greece's highest decoration for gallantry, the Cross of Valour in Gold, seven times, the Greek War Cross four times, and the Distinguished Acts Medal twice, making him one of the most highly decorated officers in Greek history.

He left the army soon after the end of the Civil War, and served as prefect of the Kastoria Prefecture from 1962 until April 1967, when he resigned. In 1977–1979, in the lead-up to Greece's accession to the European Economic Community, he was head of the Greek press office in Brussels. After 1979, he served as secretary-general of the Historical and Ethnological Society of Greece (I&EEE), which supervises the National Historical Museum in Athens, a post he held for over forty years.

His son, Konstantinos Mazarakis-Ainian, became an admiral and chief of the Greek navy's Fleet Command.

== Works ==
- Notes from the Raiding Units (1947-1949) (Σημειώματα από τις Μονάδες Καταδρομών (1947-1949)), self-published
- History of the Greek Flag (Ιστορία της Ελληνικής Σημαίας), I&EEE editions
- The Macedonian Question and the Birth of the new Macedonian Question (Το Μακεδονικό ζήτημα και η γέννηση του νέου Μακεδονικού ζητήματος), Dodoni editions
- The Filiki Etaireia (Η Φιλική Εταιρεία), I&EEE editions
- Sketch of Modern Greek History (Διάγραμμα της Νεότερης Ελληνικής Ιστορίας), I&EEE editions
- Struggles of Modern Hellenism (Αγώνες του Νεότερου Ελληνισμού), Dodoni editions
- Flags of Liberty - Collections of the National Historical Museum (Σημαίες Ελευθερίας – Συλλογή Εθνικού Ιστορικού Μουσείου), I&EEE editions
- The new Macedonian Question today (Το νέο Μακεδονικό ζήτημα σήμερα), Dodoni editions
- The Macedonian Struggle. With a Map of the Schools of Macedonia and Images (Ο Μακεδονικός Αγώνας. Με ένα χάρτη των Σχολείων της Μακεδονίας και εικόνες), Dodoni editions
- The Entry of the Ottoman Empire into the War and the Gallipoli Operation (Η Είσοδος της Οθωμανικής Αυτοκρατορίας στον πόλεμο και η επιχείρηση της Καλλιπόλεως), National Historical Museum editions
- The ship figureheads of the National Historical Museum (Τα ακρόπρωρα του Εθνικού Ιστορικού Μουσείου), I&EEE editions
- The Macedonian Struggle (Ο Μακεδονικός Αγών), Real News editions.
- The Greek Printing Presses of the Greek Revolution 1821-1827 (Τα Ελληνικά Τυπογραφεία του Αγώνα 1821–1827), I&EEE editions
- The Naval Struggle 1821-1830 (Ο Ναυτικός Αγώνας 1821–1830), I&EEE editions
