= Nikolaos Vlachopoulos =

Greek Army officer (1868–1957)

- Νικόλαος Βλαχόπουλος
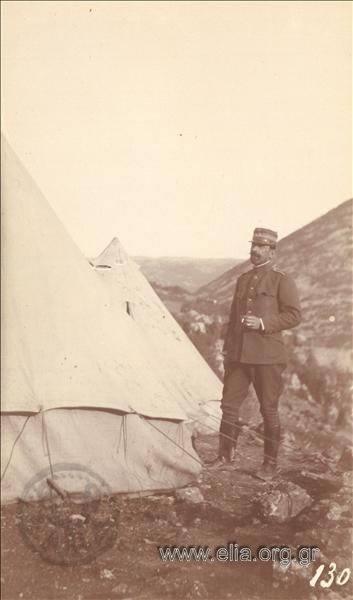
- Vlachopoulos on the Epirus Front in 1912
- Born: 1868; Chalkis, Kingdom of Greece
- Died: 1957 (aged 88–89); Athens, Kingdom of Greece
- Alma mater: Hellenic Military Academy
- Children: 2
- Military career
- Allegiance: Kingdom of Greece; Second Hellenic Republic
- Branch: Hellenic Army
- Service years: 1886–1920; 1922–1928
- Rank: Lieutenant general
- Commands: 4th Infantry Division; 2nd Infantry Division; Military Governor of Smyrna; Chief of Hellenic Army General Staff
- Wars: Balkan Wars; World War I Southern Russia Intervention; Greco-Turkish War (1919–22)

Nikolaos Vlachopoulos (Greek: Νικόλαος Βλαχόπουλος; 1868–1957) was a Hellenic Army officer who rose to the rank of Lieutenant General. He participated in all the Greek wars of the early 20th century, and served twice as chief of the Hellenic Army General Staff, in 1922–1924 and in 1927–1928.

== Biography ==
Nikolaos Vlachopoulos was born in Chalkis in 1868. He enrolled in the Hellenic Military Academy and graduated on 9 September 1888 as an Artillery 2nd Lieutenant. He continued his studies in Germany and Belgium, and on his return to Greece served as professor in the Military Academy. During the Balkan Wars of 1912–13 he commanded a field artillery battalion, fighting in the Epirus front during the First Balkan War, and participating many battles of the subsequent Second Balkan War against Bulgaria.

During World War I, having reached the rank of colonel, he served in the Macedonian front as CO of the 4th Infantry Division. Promoted to major general in 1919, he assumed command of the Athens-based 2nd Infantry Division and led it during the Greek participation in the Allied intervention in Ukraine against the Bolsheviks. On his return he was appointed as the first military governor of Smyrna following its occupation by Greece, and remained in Anatolia until dismissed from the army following the monarchist victory in the November 1920 elections.

After the defeat of the Greek army in Anatolia by the Turkish forces in August 1922, however, Vlachopoulos was recalled to service and appointed chief of the Army Staff Service, serving until 1924. In the same year he was promoted to lieutenant general, and served once again as Chief of the Army Staff in 1927–28, when he retired.

Vlachopoulos was a well-educated officer, who spoke fluently German, French, Italian and English. He also wrote an artillery manual for the Military Academy and translated into Greek the book of the German field marshal Colmar Freiherr von der Goltz on the Greco-Turkish War of 1897.

He was married with two children, and died in 1957.

Military offices
Preceded by Lt. General Viktor Dousmanis	Chief of the Hellenic Army General Staff; 1922–1924	Succeeded by Major General Petros Klados
Preceded by Lt. General Alexandros Mazarakis-Ainian	Chief of the Hellenic Army General Staff; 1927–1928	Succeeded by Major General Alexandros Merentitis
