= Petros Klados =

Greek Army officer

Petros Klados (Greek: Πέτρος Κλάδος) was a Greek Army officer who reached the rank of lieutenant general and served as Chief of the Hellenic Army General Staff.

== Biography ==
Petros Klados was born in Piraeus in 1879, and entered the Hellenic Army Academy, graduating as an infantry second lieutenant on 11 July 1901. He continued his education at the in France at the École supérieure de guerre, and quickly established himself as a competent and well-esteemed officer.

He participated in the Balkan Wars of 1912–13, and in 1915, he was appointed chief of staff of the 6th Infantry Division, a critical position at the time, as the unit was tasked with securing the new Greek border against Bulgaria and raids by pro-Bulgarian komitadjis, and erecting fortifications at Rupel Pass and Faia Petra.

In 1916, the Bulgarians occupied eastern Macedonia and enforced the surrender of the Greek IV Army Corps, which was interned in Germany. Klados refused to surrender, and fought in the Macedonian front of World War I, as chief of staff of the Archipelago Division.

He fought also in the Asia Minor Campaign, as chief of staff of the Smyrna Army Corps until the November 1920 elections, after which he was dismissed by the new royalist government. He was reinstated in the army after the Greek defeat in Asia Minor, and went on to command divisions and army corps, as well as the Army Academy. In 1924, he served as Chief of the Hellenic Army General Staff.

He retired in 1934, and died in 1957.

Military offices
Preceded by Lt. General Nikolaos Vlachopoulos	Chief of the Hellenic Army General Staff; 1924	Succeeded by Lt. General Alexandros Mazarakis-Ainian
