= Ptolemaios Sarigiannis =

Greek Army officer

- Πτολεμαίος Σαρηγιάννης
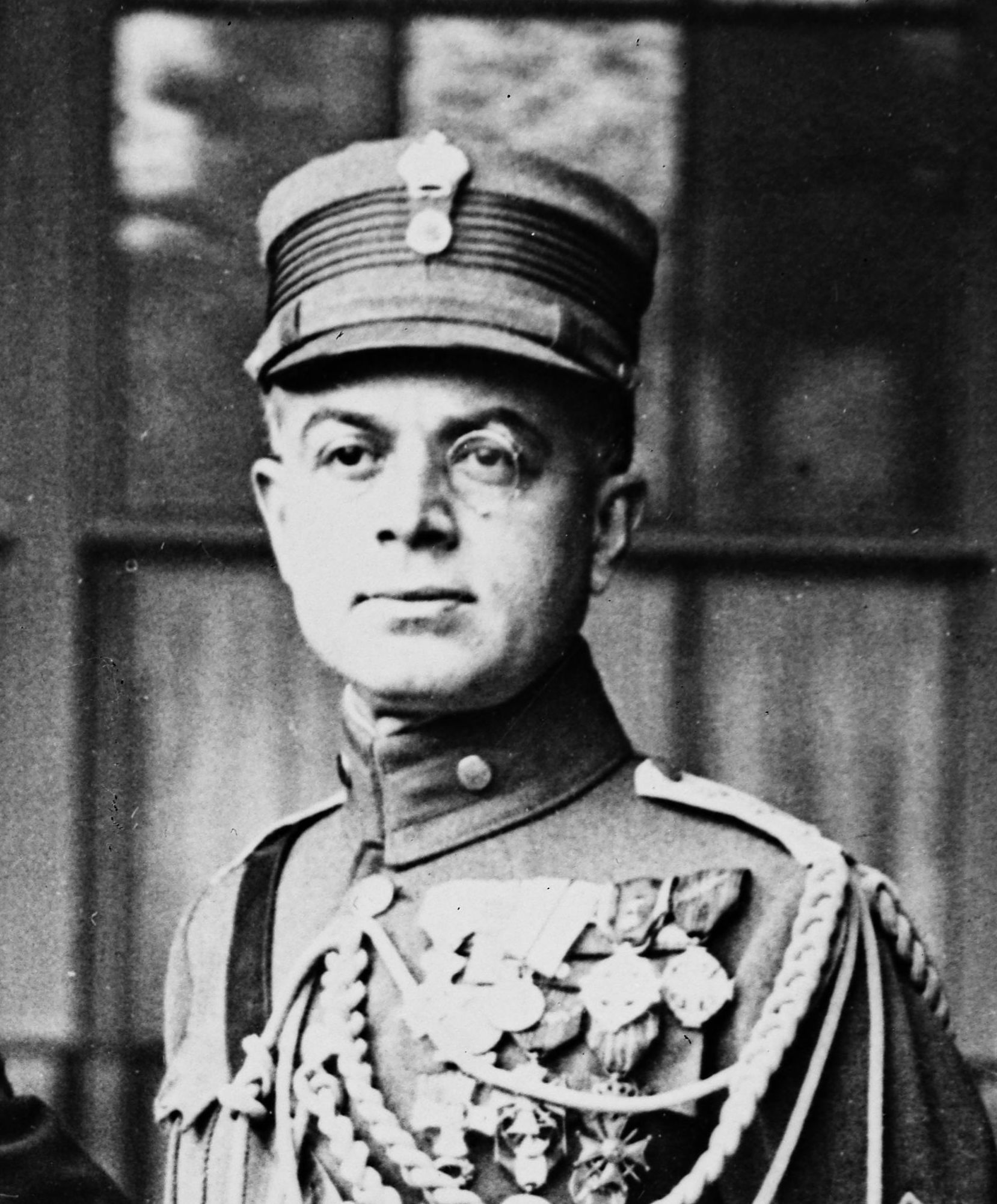
- Sarigiannis as a member of the Greek delegation in London c. February 1921.
- Born: c. 1882; Piraeus, Kingdom of Greece
- Died: c. 1958
- Alma mater: Hellenic Military Academy; École supérieure de guerre
- Military career
- Allegiance: Kingdom of Greece; (Greece) Second Hellenic Republic
- Branch: Hellenic Army
- Service years: 1900–1922; 1925–1926
- Rank: Major General
- Wars: Macedonian Struggle; Balkan Wars: First Balkan War; Second Balkan War; World War I: Macedonian front; Battle of Skra-di-Legen; Greco-Turkish War (1919–1922)
- Awards: Order of the Redeemer; War Cross; Medal of Military Merit; Commemorative Medal for the Macedonian Struggle; Croix de Guerre

Ptolemaios Sarigiannis (Greek: Πτολεμαίος Σαρηγιάννης, c. 1882–1958) was a Greek Army officer who rose to the rank of Major General, holding senior staff positions during the Greco-Turkish War of 1919–1922 and serving as Chief of the Hellenic Army General Staff in 1925–1926.

== Life ==
Ptolemaios Sarigiannis was born in Piraeus in about 1882. He entered the Hellenic Army Academy in 1900 and was commissioned a 2nd Lieutenant of Engineers on 9 July 1903. He later completed his studies as a staff officer in the École Supérieure de Guerre. In 1906–1908 he participated in the Greek Struggle for Macedonia against the Bulgarian-sponsored Internal Macedonian Revolutionary Organization (IMRO), serving in the Greek consulate of Monastir under the assumed name Kalamidis. In 1909 he was promoted to Lieutenant, and participated in the Balkan Wars of 1912–1913 as Commander of Engineers of the 3rd Infantry Division.

Promoted to Captain in 1913 and Major in 1915, Sarigiannis joined the Venizelist Movement of National Defence, and served as chief of staff of the Crete Division on the Macedonian front. Promoted to Lt. Colonel in 1917, he was again promoted to Colonel in 1919 in recognition of distinguished service during the May 1918 Battle of Skra-di-Legen.

Sarigiannis played a crucial role in the Greco-Turkish War of 1919–1922, initially as chief of staff to the Army of Occupation in the Smyrna Zone, as deputy chief of staff to the expanded Army of Asia Minor during the 1921 operations, and finally as deputy chief of staff in the Army of Thrace. In this capacity he also participated in the February 1921 London Conference as a member of the Greek delegation under Prime Minister Nikolaos Kalogeropoulos. Following the collapse of the Greek front in August 1922, he participated in the Greek delegation to the Mudanya Armistice negotiations under Major General Alexandros Mazarakis-Ainian.

Sarigiannis was dismissed from the army shortly after, but was recalled to active service, promoted Major General and placed as head of the Hellenic Army General Staff (replacing Mazarakis-Ainian) in 1925, when general Theodoros Pangalos seized power. Sarigiannis was dismissed again on 31 August 1926, after Pangalos' fall, and was replaced by Mazarakis-Ainian.

In 1944, after Greece was liberated from German occupation, he served briefly as Vice-Minister of Military Affairs. Prior to that, he was elected as a member of the National Council established by the National Liberation Front.

He died in 1958.

Military offices
Preceded by Lt. General Alexandros Mazarakis-Ainian	Chief of the Hellenic Army General Staff; June 1925 – 31 August 1926	Succeeded by Lt. General Alexandros Mazarakis-Ainian
