= Operation Koronis =

Military campaign by Greek royalist government during the Greek Civil War

| Date | June 14/16 – August 20/21, 1948 (sources differ) |
| Location | Grammos, border of Ioannina and Kastoria, Epirus, northwestern Greece |
| Result | Tactical Hellenic Army victory: Strategically inconclusive; Failure to encircle the communist forces |

Belligerents
| (Greece) Provisional Democratic Government: Democratic Army of Greece | Kingdom of Greece: National Army |

Commanders and leaders
| (Greece) Markos Vafiadis | (Greece) Ioannis Kitrilakis (2nd Corps) (Greece) Thrasyvoulos Tsakalotos (1st Corps) |

Strength
| 12,500; 50 artillery | 40,000–70,000 (6 divisions) |

Casualties and losses
| 3,128 killed 589 captured 603 deserted | 801 killed 31 captured/missing |

Operation Koronis (Greek: Επιχείρηση «Κορωνίς», "crown" in Greek) was a military campaign launched by the royalist government in Athens against the main stronghold of the communist forces during the Greek Civil War. The communist defenses were two lines of fortifications with minefields and concealed bunkers. Initial air attacks used small-sized bombs and inaccurate targeting, but eventually, the frequency of attacks was more than tripled. After neutralizing the minefields by forcing herds of animals to walk over them, the government army launched simultaneous attacks from two sides. In the southwest, the hill of Kleftis changed hands repeatedly. With heavier casualties against a numerically superior opponent, the communists had their wounded and artillery moved across the border to the People's Republic of Albania. At the same time, the remaining 8,000 retreated to Mount Vitsi.

== Aftermath ==
Although the Hellenic Army failed to completely defeat the communists, the latter realized the lack of assistance they received from the Soviet Union, and the royalist government became stronger with assistance from the United States (Truman Doctrine). During the campaign, the Tito–Stalin Split developed between Yugoslavia and the Soviet Union which would eventually split the Greek communists into separate factions.

== Bibliography ==
- A Military History of the Cold War, 1944–1962 By Jonathan M. House
- Encyclopedia of Insurgency and Counterinsurgency: A New Era of Modern Warfare edited by Spencer C. Tucker
