= 3rd Greek Mountain Brigade =

Government in exile unit during WWII

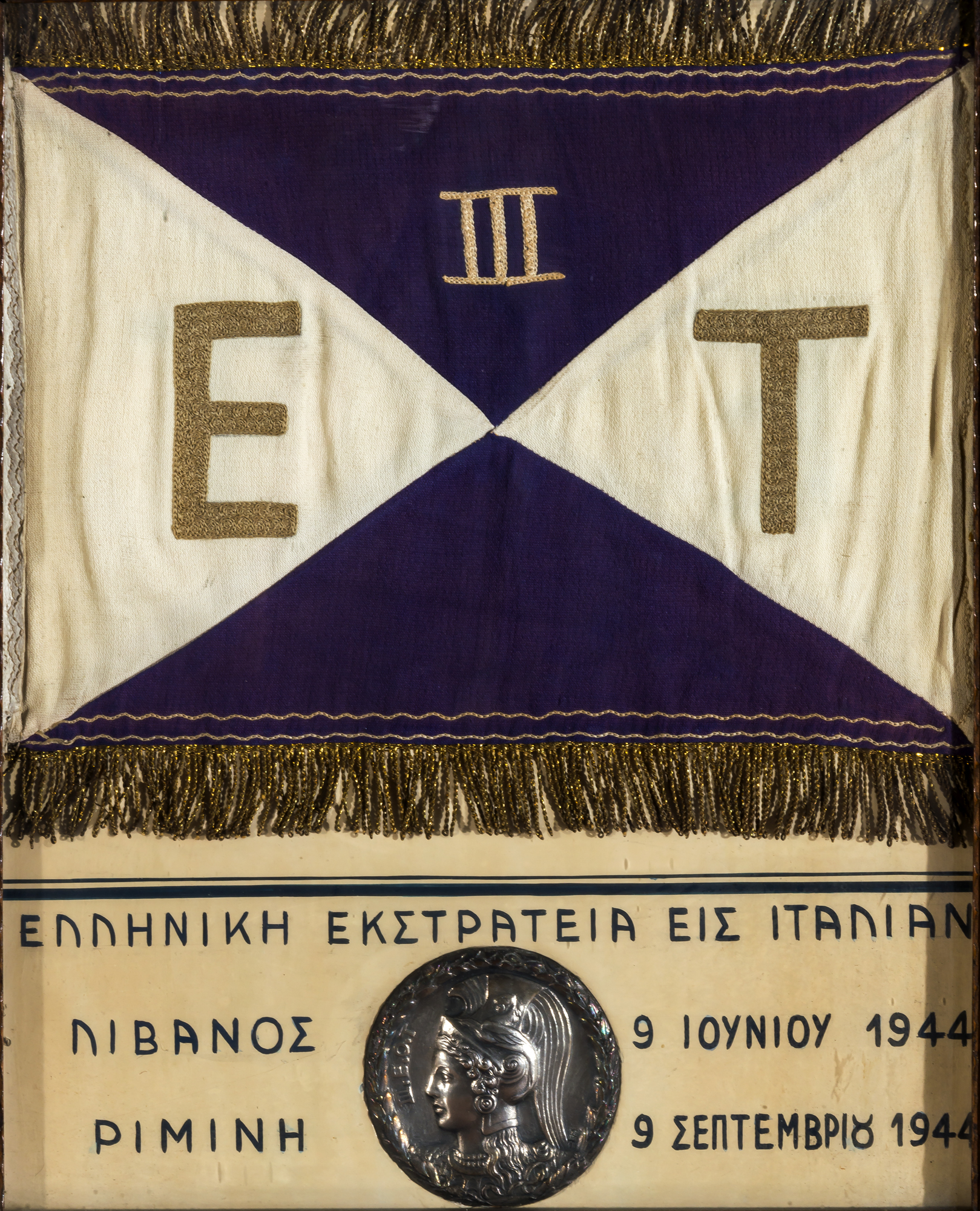
- Flag of the 3rd Greek Mountain Brigade (Athens War Museum)
- Active: 1944–1945
- Allegiance: Kingdom of Greece
- Branch: Hellenic Army
- Type: Mountain infantry
- Size: Brigade
- Engagements: Battle of Rimini; Dekemvriana

Commanders
- Commander: Col. Thrasyvoulos Tsakalotos

The 3rd Greek Mountain Brigade (Greek: 3η Ελληνική Ορεινή Ταξιαρχία, Triti Elliniki Οrini Τaxiarkhia, ΙΙΙ Ε.Ο.Τ.) was a unit of mountain infantry formed by the Greek government in exile in Egypt during World War II. It was formed from a few thousand politically reliable loyalists, and was briefly trained in Lebanon before being dispatched to Italy. Commanded by Colonel Thrasyvoulos Tsakalotos, it fought in the Battle of Rimini in Italy (under I Canadian Corps), where it earned the honorific title "Rimini Brigade" (Ταξιαρχία Ρίμινι Τaxiarkhia Rimini).

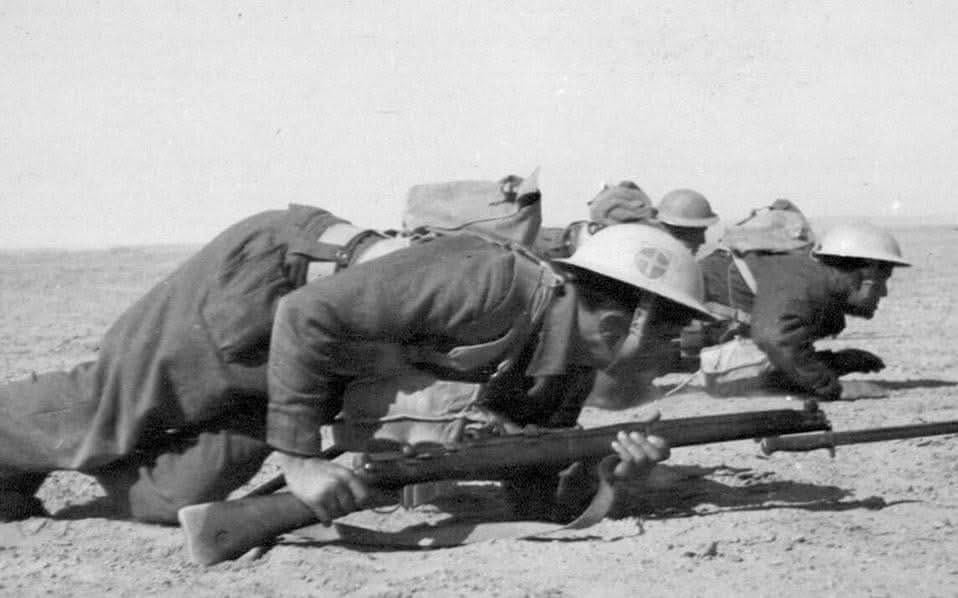
Men of the III Greek Mountain Brigade in North Africa, during the period 1941-1944.

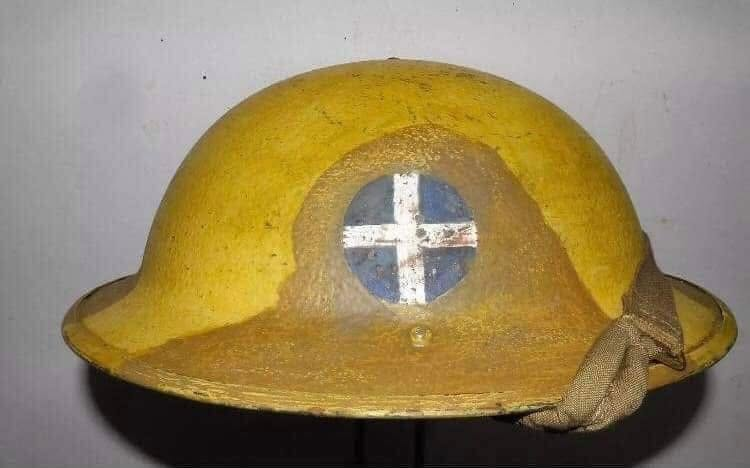
A Brodie Mk II desert helmet, with the Greek markings on the side, which was used by the soldiers of the 3rd Greek Mountain Brigade.

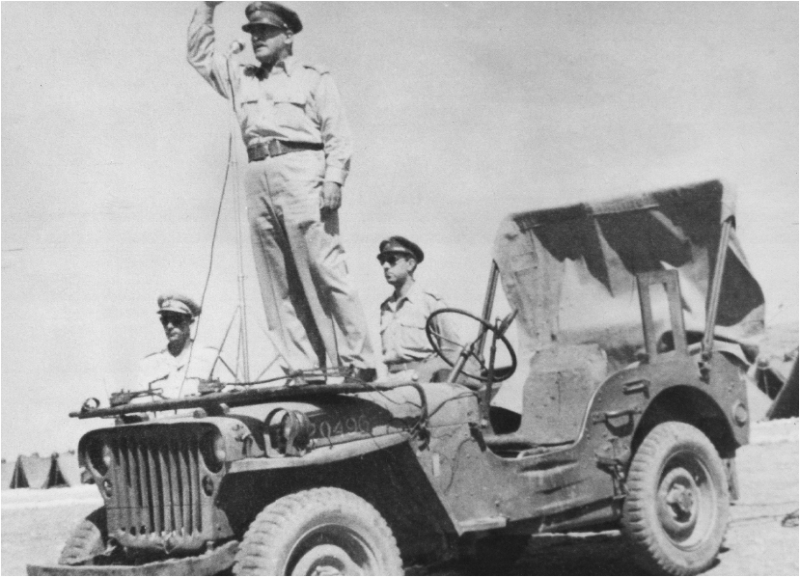
Colonel Thrasyvoulos Tsakalotos speaking to soldiers of the 3rd Greek Mountain Brigade before being dispatched to Italy, June 1944.
