= List of diplomatic missions of Hungary =

Hungary has a wide network of diplomatic missions, having redefined itself as a medium-sized power in Central Europe, and recently has joined NATO (1999) and the European Union (2004). Its network of embassies and consulates abroad reflect its foreign policy priorities in Western Europe, and in neighbouring countries that share historic links to Hungary, as those that host ethnic Hungarians.

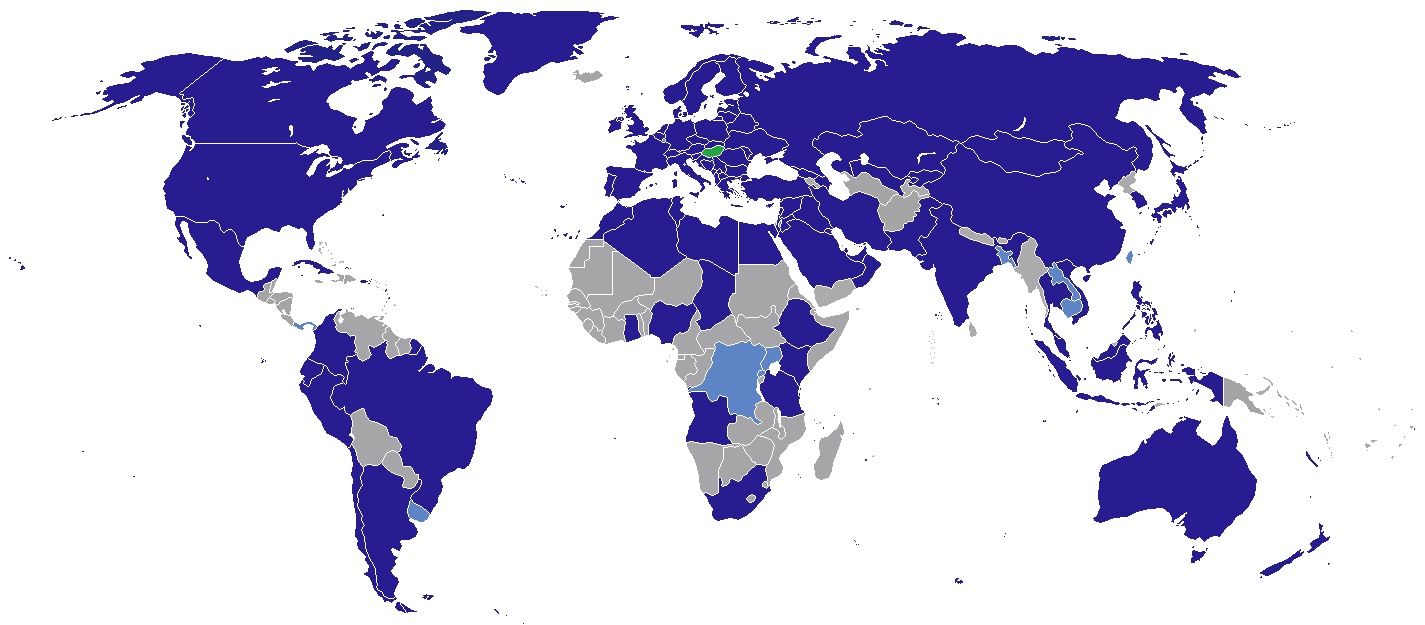
Hungary Countries that host Hungarian embassies Countries that host only Hungarian consular missions, embassy branch offices, and missions that serve as de facto embassy

== Current missions ==
=== Africa ===
Host country	Host city	Mission	Concurrent accreditation	Ref.
Algeria	Algiers	Embassy	Countries: Mali	
Angola	Luanda	Embassy	Countries: Congo-Brazzaville; Equatorial Guinea; Mozambique; São Tomé and Príncipe	
Chad	N'Djamena	Embassy		
Congo-Kinshasa	Kinshasa	Embassy office (Note: Subordinate to the Hungarian embassy in Nairobi, Kenya.)		
Egypt	Cairo	Embassy	Countries: Eritrea; South Sudan; Sudan	
Ethiopia	Addis Ababa	Embassy	Countries: Djibouti	
Ghana	Accra	Embassy	Countries: Burkina Faso; Gambia; Guinea; Ivory Coast; Liberia; Senegal; Sierra Leone; Togo	
Kenya	Nairobi	Embassy	Countries: Burundi; Comoros; Congo-Kinshasa; Rwanda; Seychelles; Somalia; Uganda; International Organizations: United Nations; United Nations Environment Programme; United Nations Human Settlements Programme	
Libya	Tripoli	Embassy		
Morocco	Rabat	Embassy	Countries: Mauritania	
Nigeria	Abuja	Embassy	Countries: Benin; Cameroon; Central African Republic; Gabon	
Rwanda	Kigali	Embassy office		
South Africa	Pretoria	Embassy	Countries: Botswana; Eswatini; Lesotho; Madagascar; Malawi; Mauritius; Namibia; Zambia; Zimbabwe	
Tanzania	Dar es Salaam	Embassy		
Tunisia	Tunis	Embassy		
Uganda	Kampala	Embassy office		

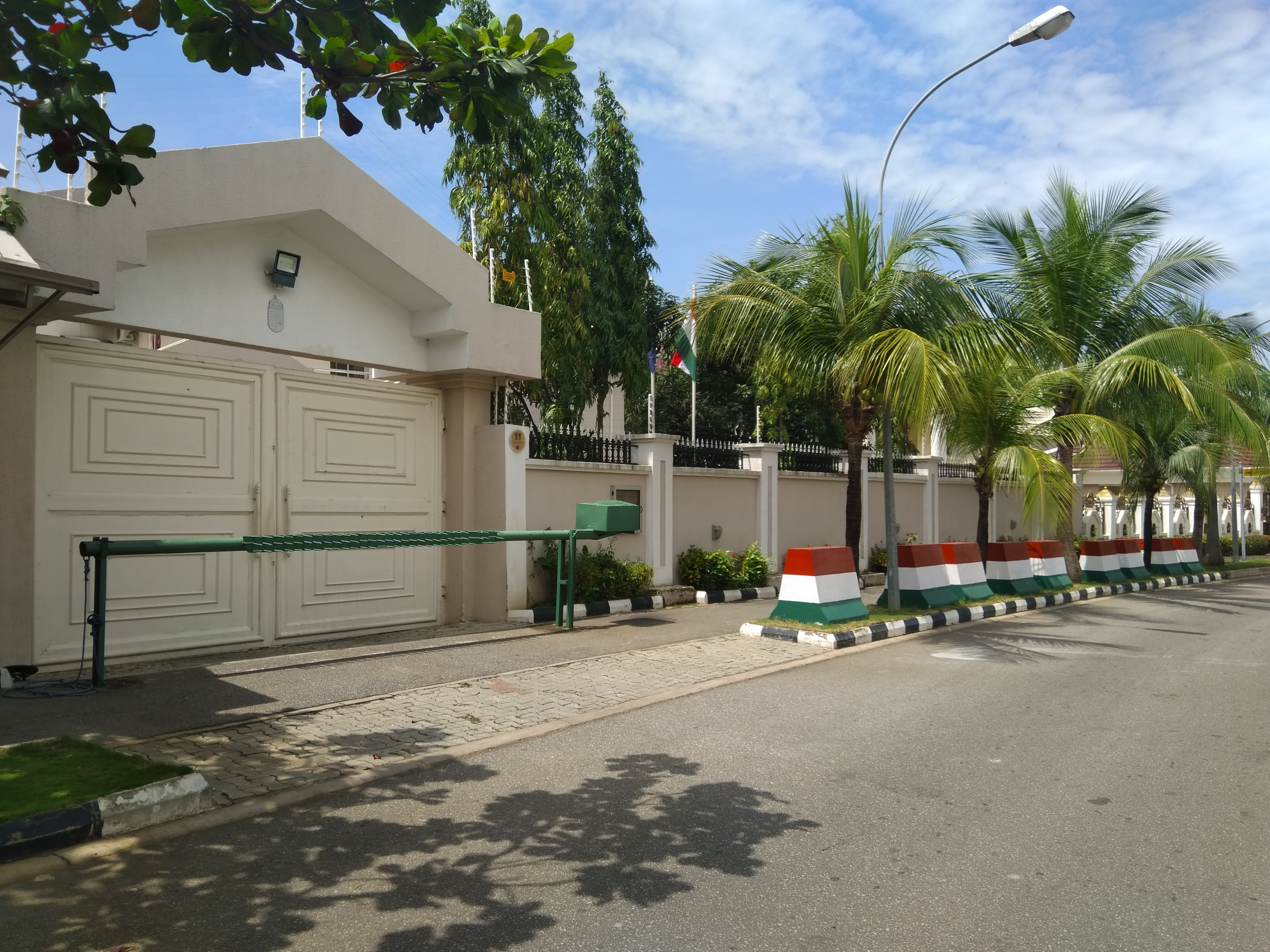
Embassy in Abuja

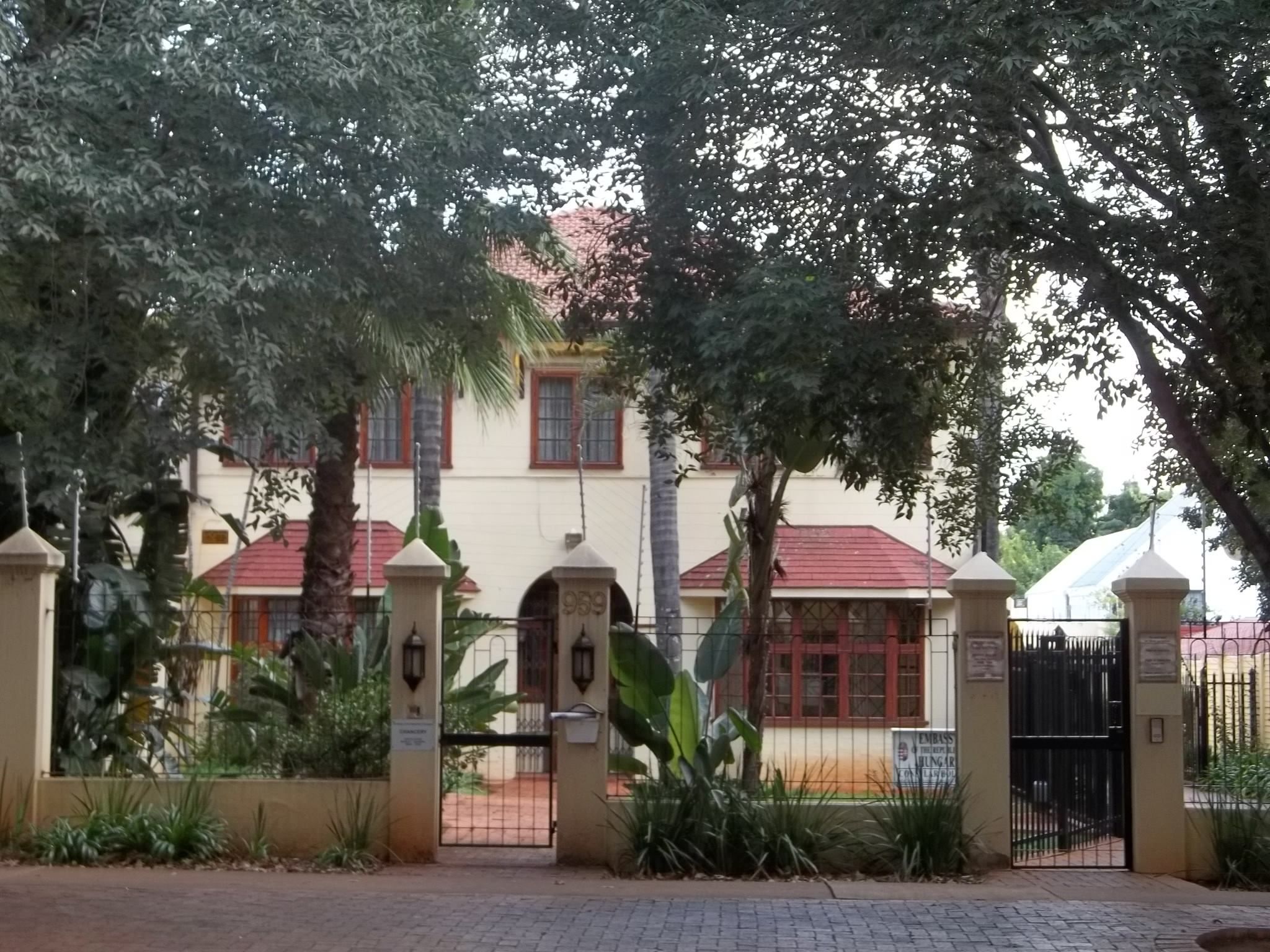
Embassy in Pretoria

=== Americas ===
Host country	Host city	Mission	Concurrent accreditation	Ref.
Argentina	Buenos Aires	Embassy	Countries: Paraguay; Uruguay	
Brazil	Brasília	Embassy		
Brazil	São Paulo	Consulate–General		
Canada	Ottawa	Embassy		
Canada	Montreal	Consulate–General		
Canada	Toronto	Consulate–General		
Canada	Vancouver	Vice-consulate		
Chile	Santiago de Chile	Embassy		
Colombia	Bogotá	Embassy	Countries: Panama	
Cuba	Havana	Embassy	Countries: Dominican Republic; Jamaica	
Ecuador	Quito	Embassy	Countries: Venezuela	
Mexico	Mexico City	Embassy	Countries: Belize; Costa Rica; El Salvador; Guatemala; Honduras; Nicaragua	
Panama	Panama City	Embassy office (Note: Subordinate to the Hungarian embassy in Bogotá, Colombia.)		
Peru	Lima	Embassy	Countries: Bolivia	
United States	Washington, D.C.	Embassy	International Organizations: Organization of American States (Note: Accredited as an observer mission.)	
United States	Chicago	Consulate–General	International Organizations: Organization of American States	
United States	Los Angeles	Consulate–General	International Organizations: Organization of American States	
United States	New York City	Consulate–General	International Organizations: Organization of American States	
United States	Houston	Vice-consulate	International Organizations: Organization of American States	
United States	Miami	Vice-consulate	International Organizations: Organization of American States	
United States	Santa Clara	Vice-consulate	International Organizations: Organization of American States	
Uruguay	Montevideo	Embassy office (Note: Subordinate to the Hungarian embassy in Buenos Aires, Argentina.)		

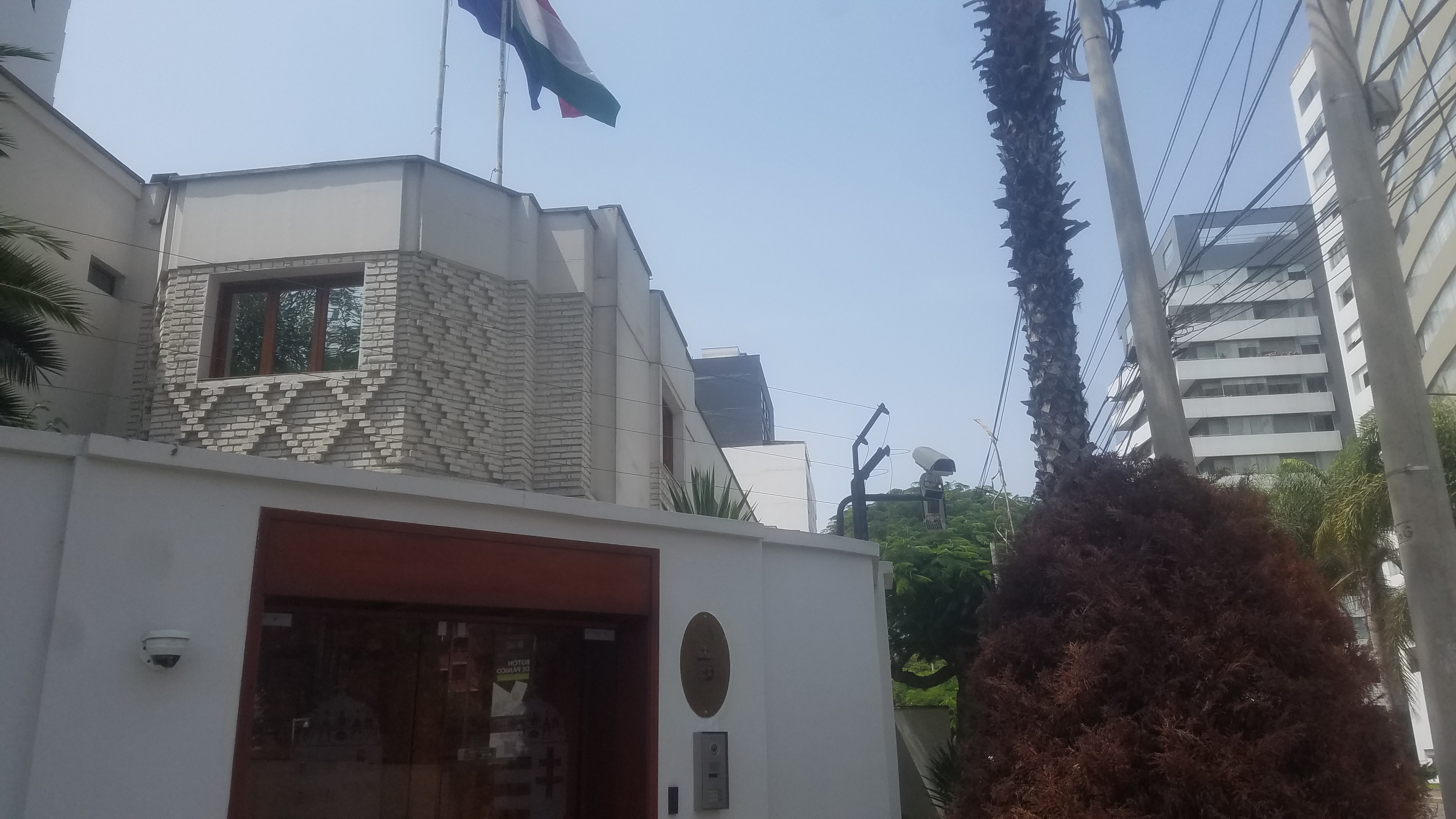
Embassy in Lima

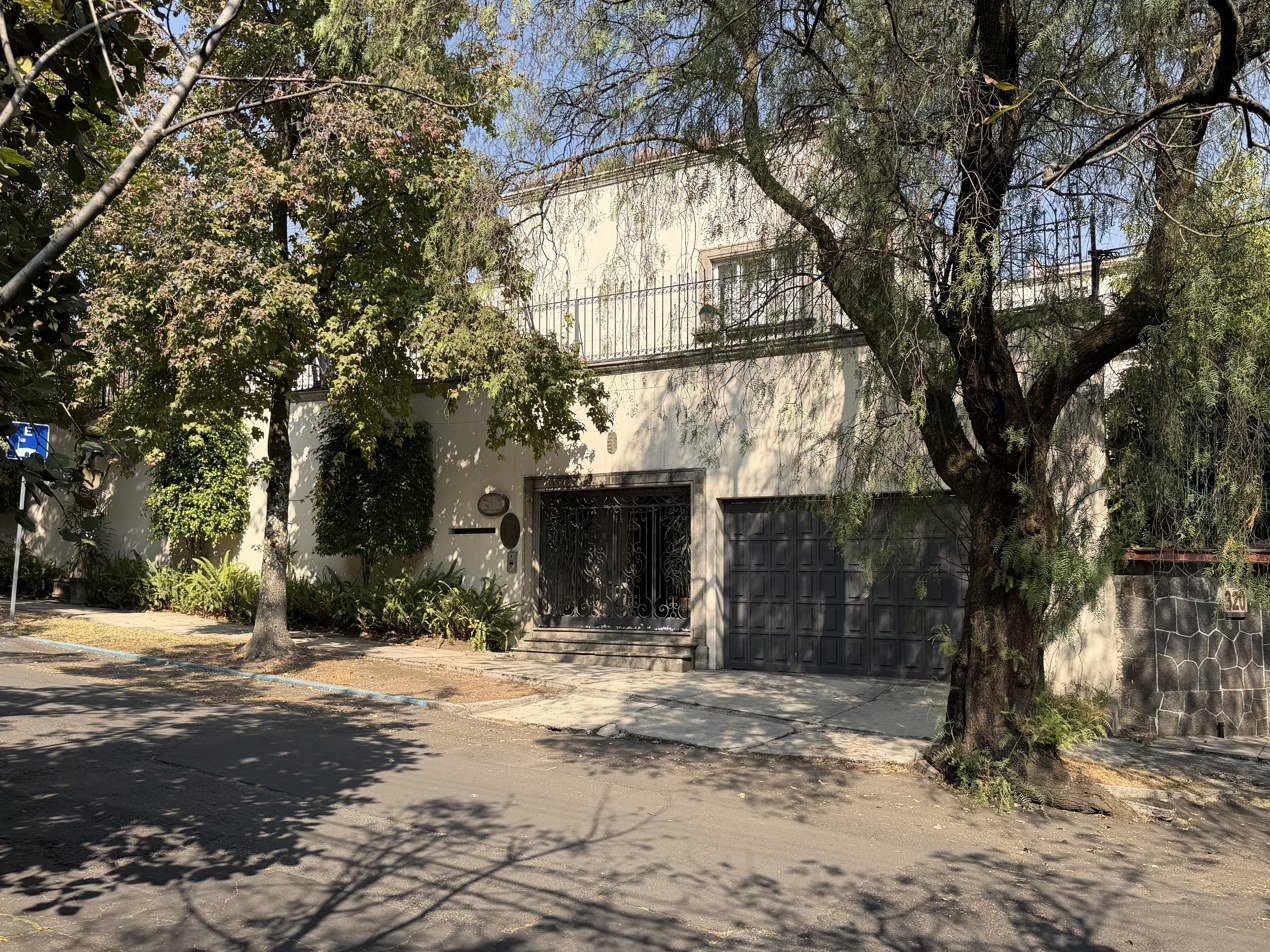
Embassy in Mexico City

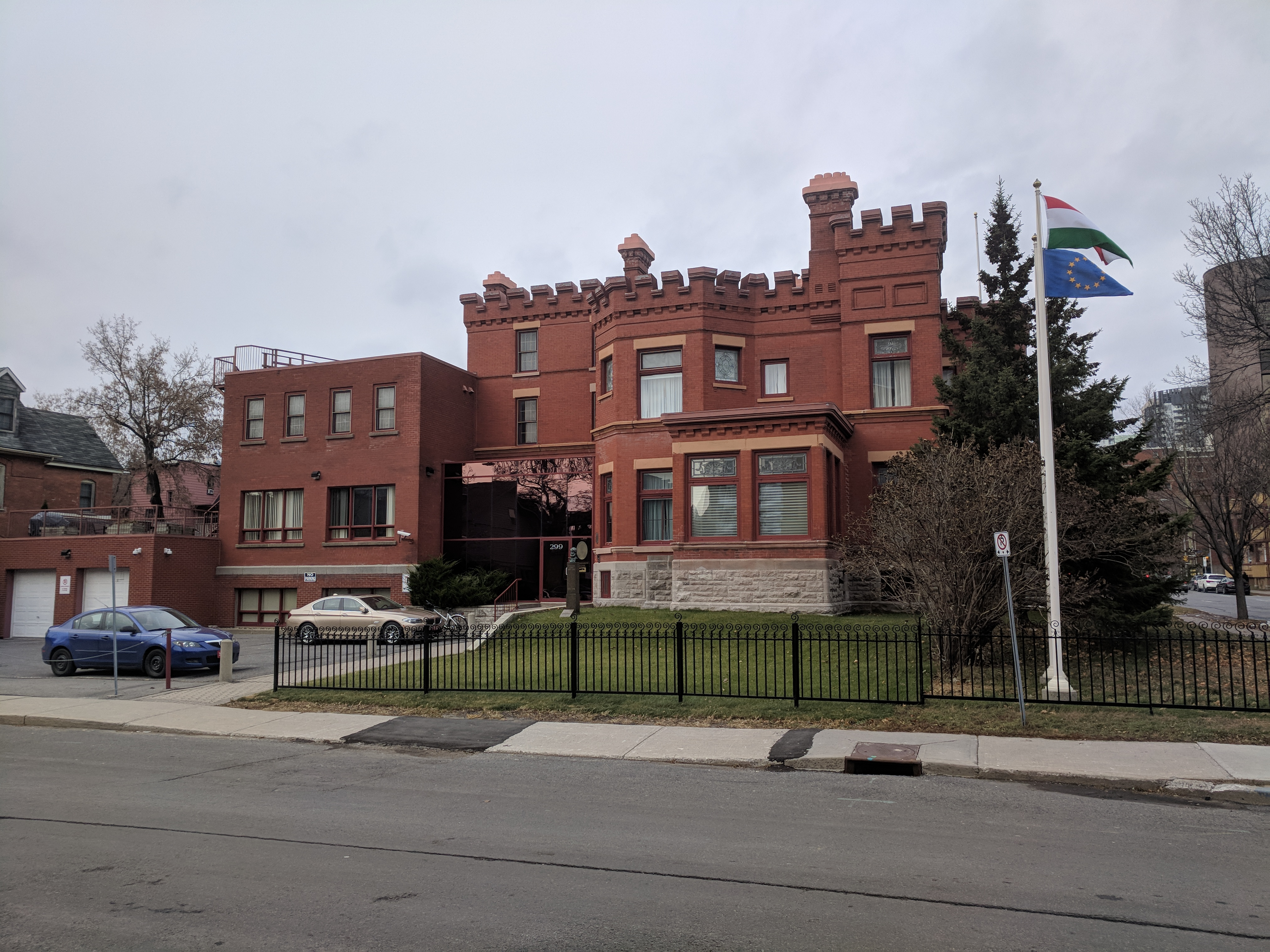
Embassy in Ottawa

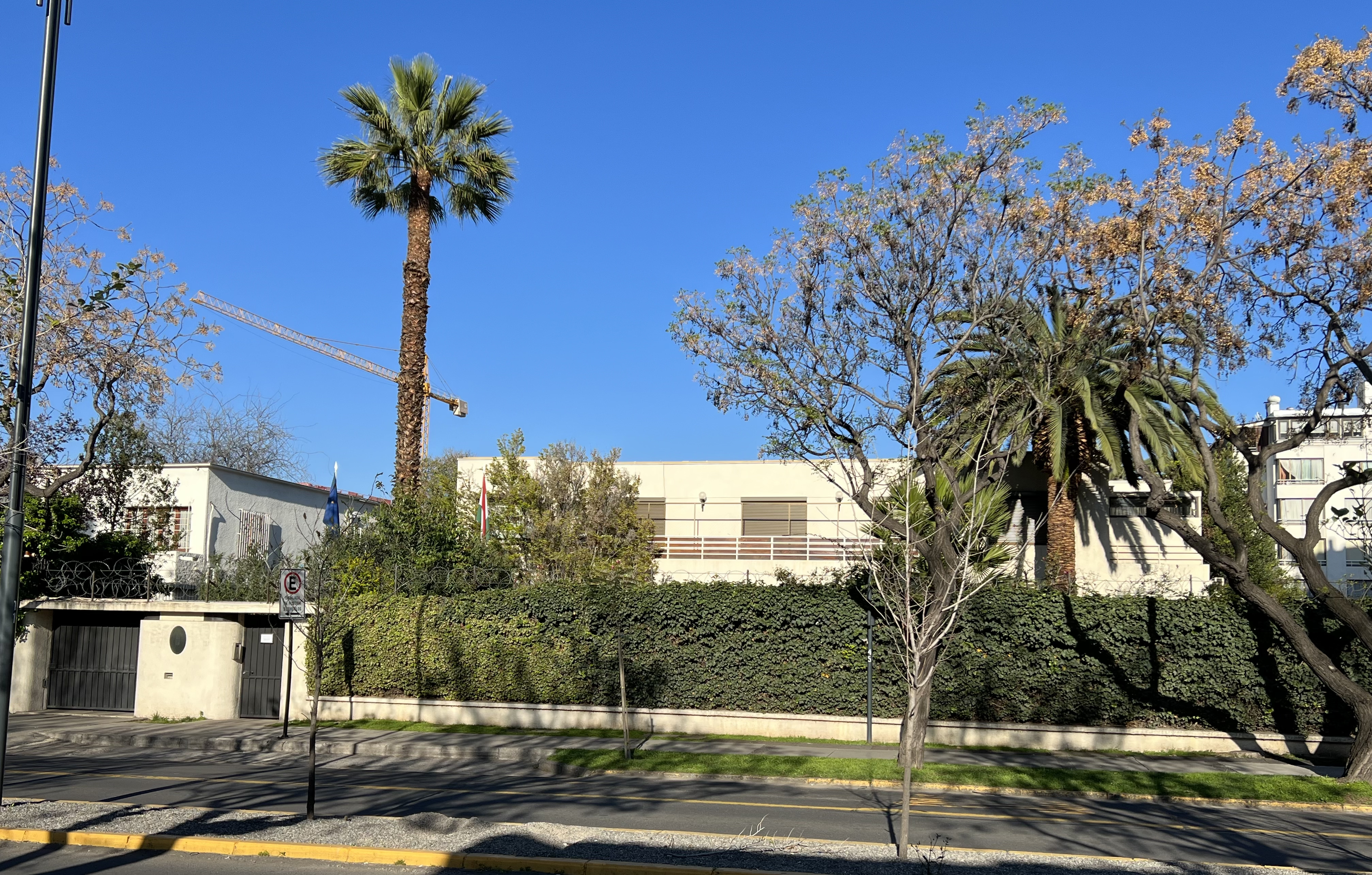
Embassy in Santiago de Chile

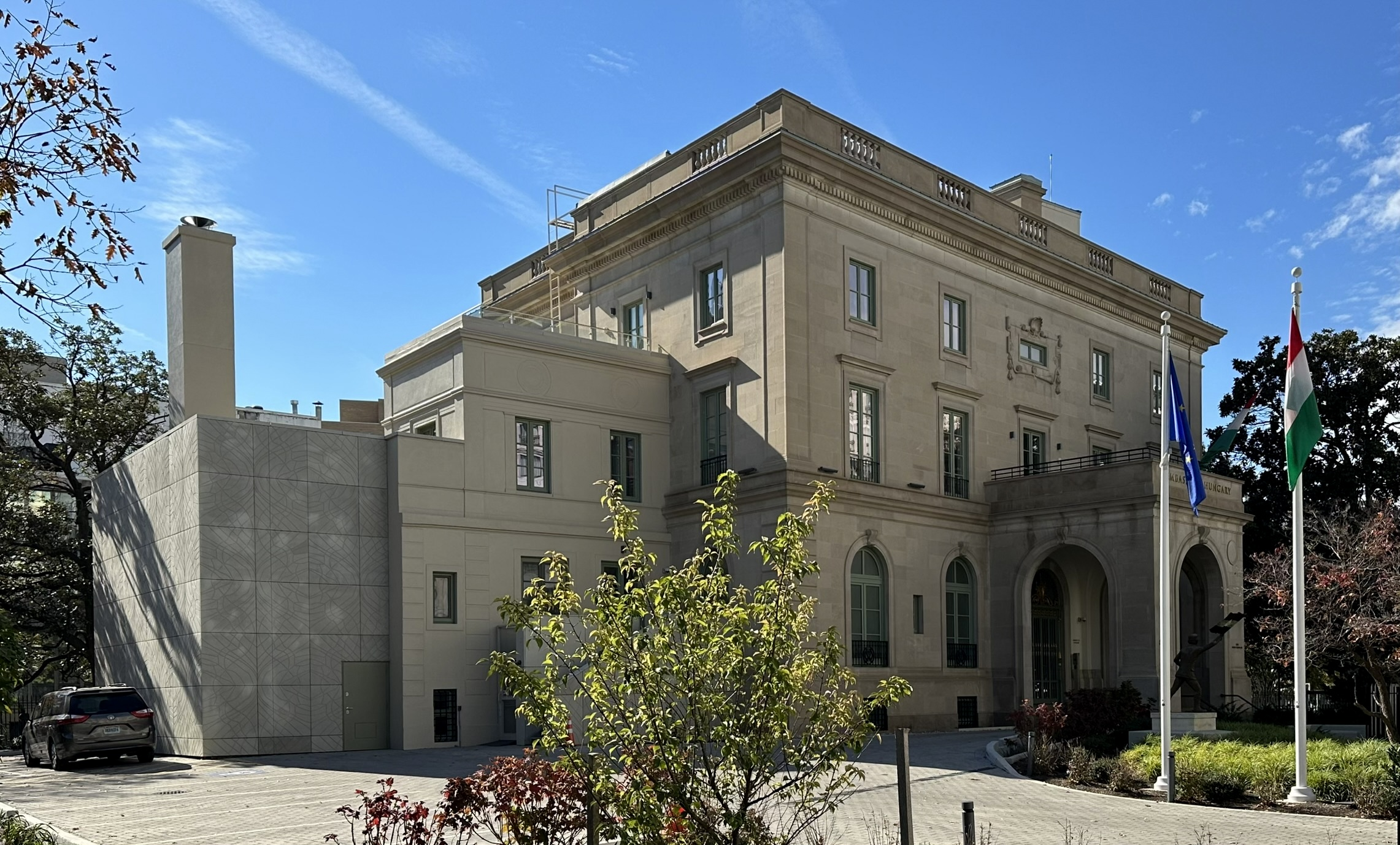
Embassy in Washington, D.C.

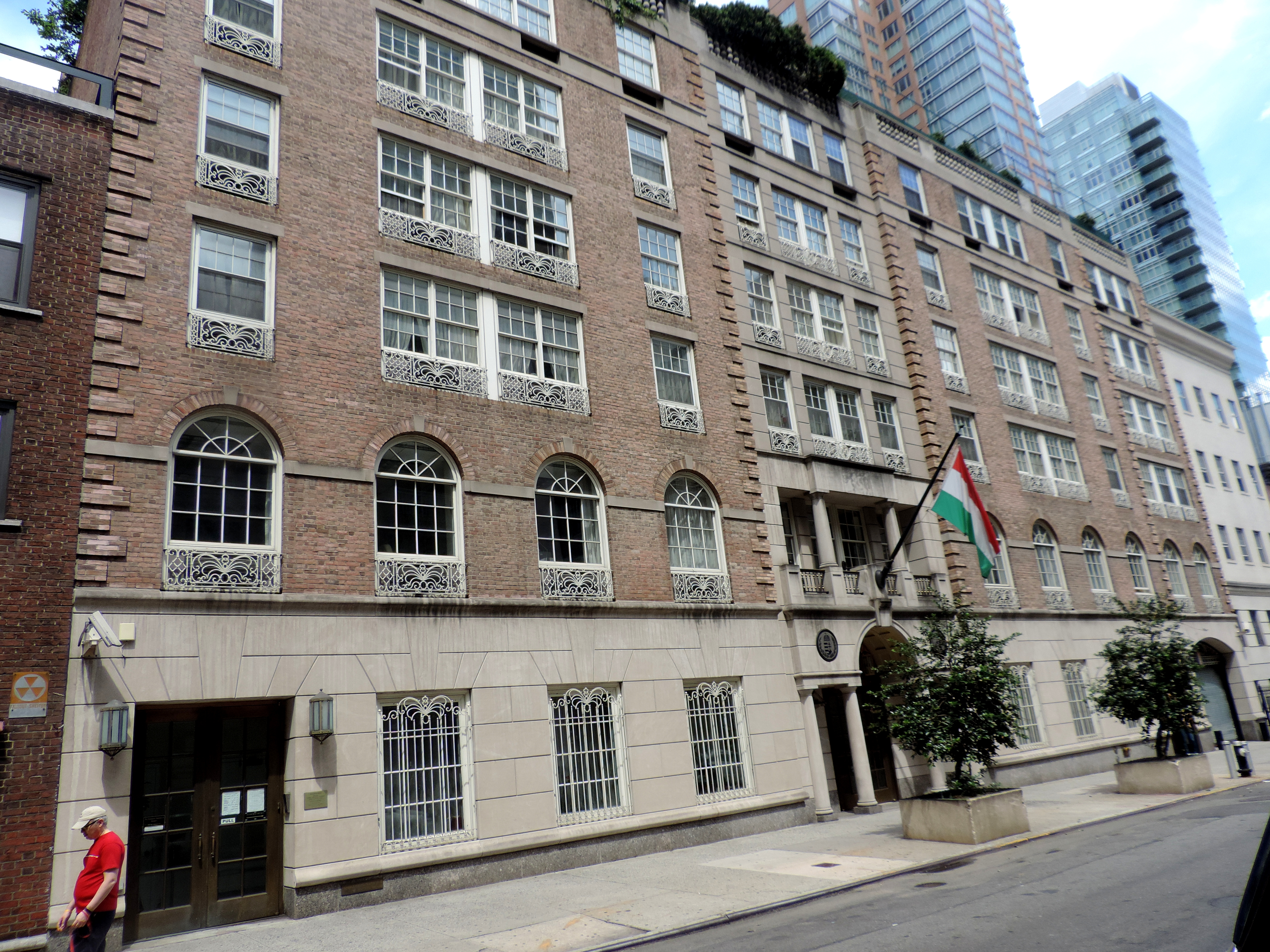
Consulate-General in New York City

=== Asia ===
Host country	Host city	Mission	Concurrent accreditation	Ref.
Azerbaijan	Baku	Embassy		
Bangladesh	Dhaka	Embassy office (Note: Subordinate to the Hungarian embassy in New Delhi, India.)		
Cambodia	Phnom Penh	Embassy office (Note: Subordinate to the Hungarian embassy in Hanoi, Vietnam.)		
China	Beijing	Embassy		
China	Chongqing	Consulate–General		
China	Guangzhou	Consulate–General		
China	Hong Kong	Consulate–General		
China	Shanghai	Consulate–General		
Georgia	Tbilisi	Embassy	Countries: Armenia	
India	New Delhi	Embassy	Countries: Bangladesh; Maldives; Nepal; Sri Lanka	
India	Mumbai	Consulate–General	Countries: Bangladesh; Maldives; Nepal; Sri Lanka	
Indonesia	Jakarta	Embassy	Countries: Timor-Leste; International Organizations: Association of Southeast Asian Nations	
Iran	Tehran	Embassy		
Iraq	Baghdad	Embassy		
Iraq	Erbil	Consulate–General		
Israel	Tel Aviv	Embassy		
Japan	Tokyo	Embassy		
Japan	Osaka	Consulate		
Jordan	Amman	Embassy		
Kazakhstan	Astana	Embassy	Countries: Tajikistan	
Kazakhstan	Almaty	Consulate–General	Countries: Tajikistan	
Kuwait	Kuwait City	Embassy		
Kyrgyzstan	Bishkek	Embassy		
Laos	Vientiane	Embassy		
Lebanon	Beirut	Embassy		
Malaysia	Kuala Lumpur	Embassy		
Mongolia	Ulaanbaatar	Embassy		
Oman	Muscat	Embassy		
Pakistan	Islamabad	Embassy		
Palestine	Ramallah	Representative office		
Philippines	Manila	Embassy	Countries: Marshall Islands; Micronesia; Palau; Nauru	
Qatar	Doha	Embassy		
Saudi Arabia	Riyadh	Embassy	Countries: Bahrain; Yemen	
Singapore	Singapore	Embassy	Countries: Brunei	
South Korea	Seoul	Embassy	Countries: North Korea	
Syria	Damascus	Embassy		
Republic of China (Taiwan)	Taipei	Trade office		
Thailand	Bangkok	Embassy	Countries: Myanmar	
Turkey	Ankara	Embassy		
Turkey	Istanbul	Consulate–General		
United Arab Emirates	Abu Dhabi	Embassy		
Uzbekistan	Tashkent	Embassy	Countries: Turkmenistan	
Vietnam	Hanoi	Embassy	Countries: Cambodia	
Vietnam	Ho Chi Minh City	Consulate–General	Countries: Cambodia	

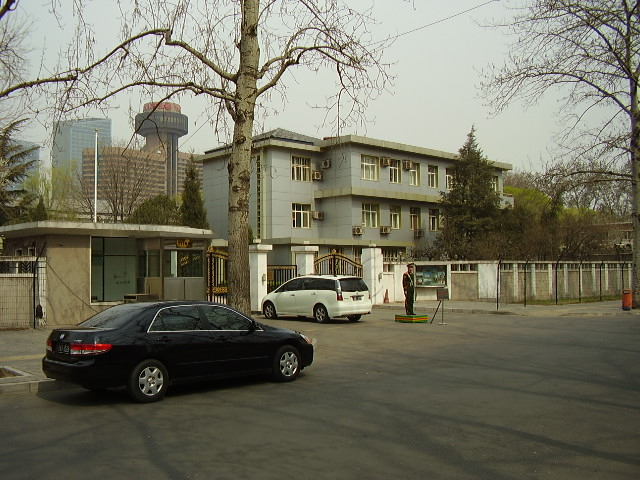
Embassy in Beijing

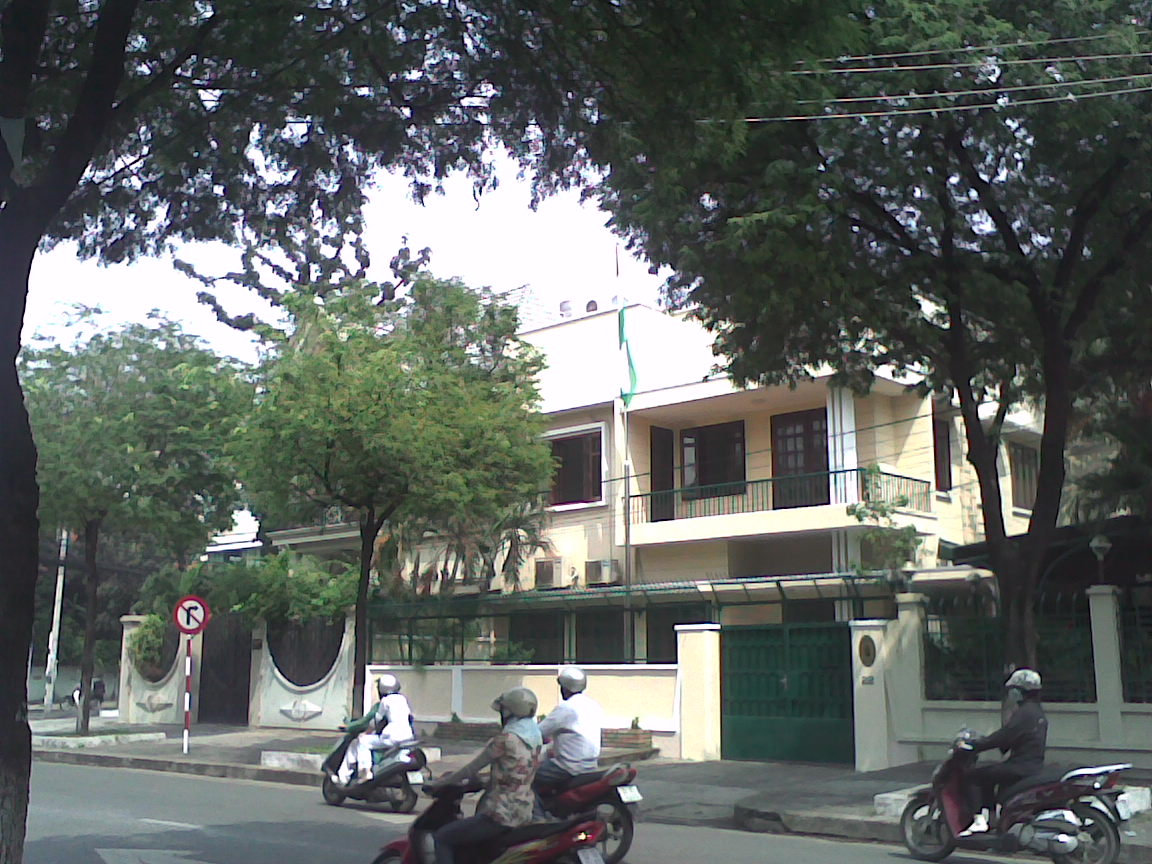
Consulate-General in Ho Chi Minh City

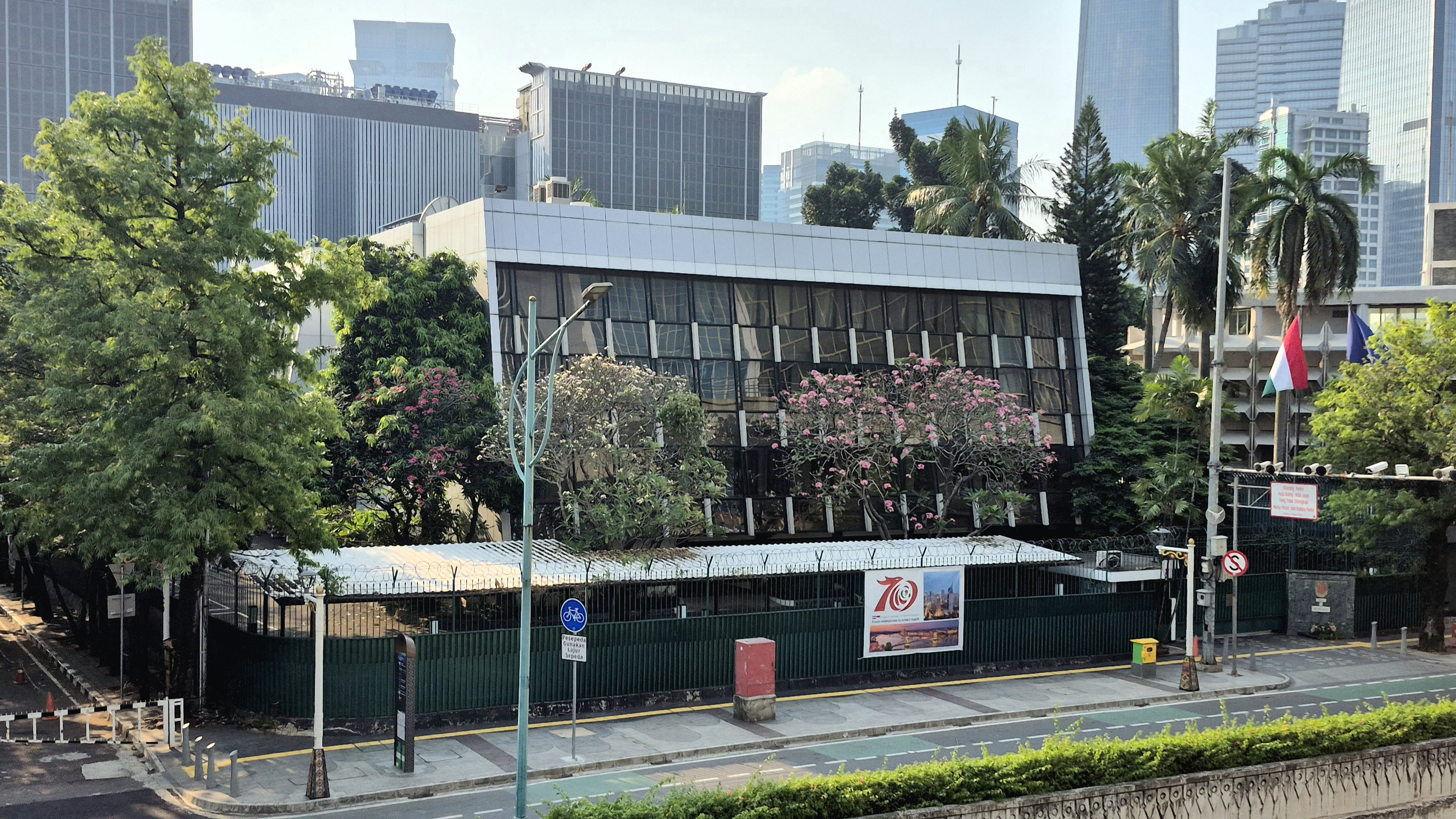
Embassy in Jakarta

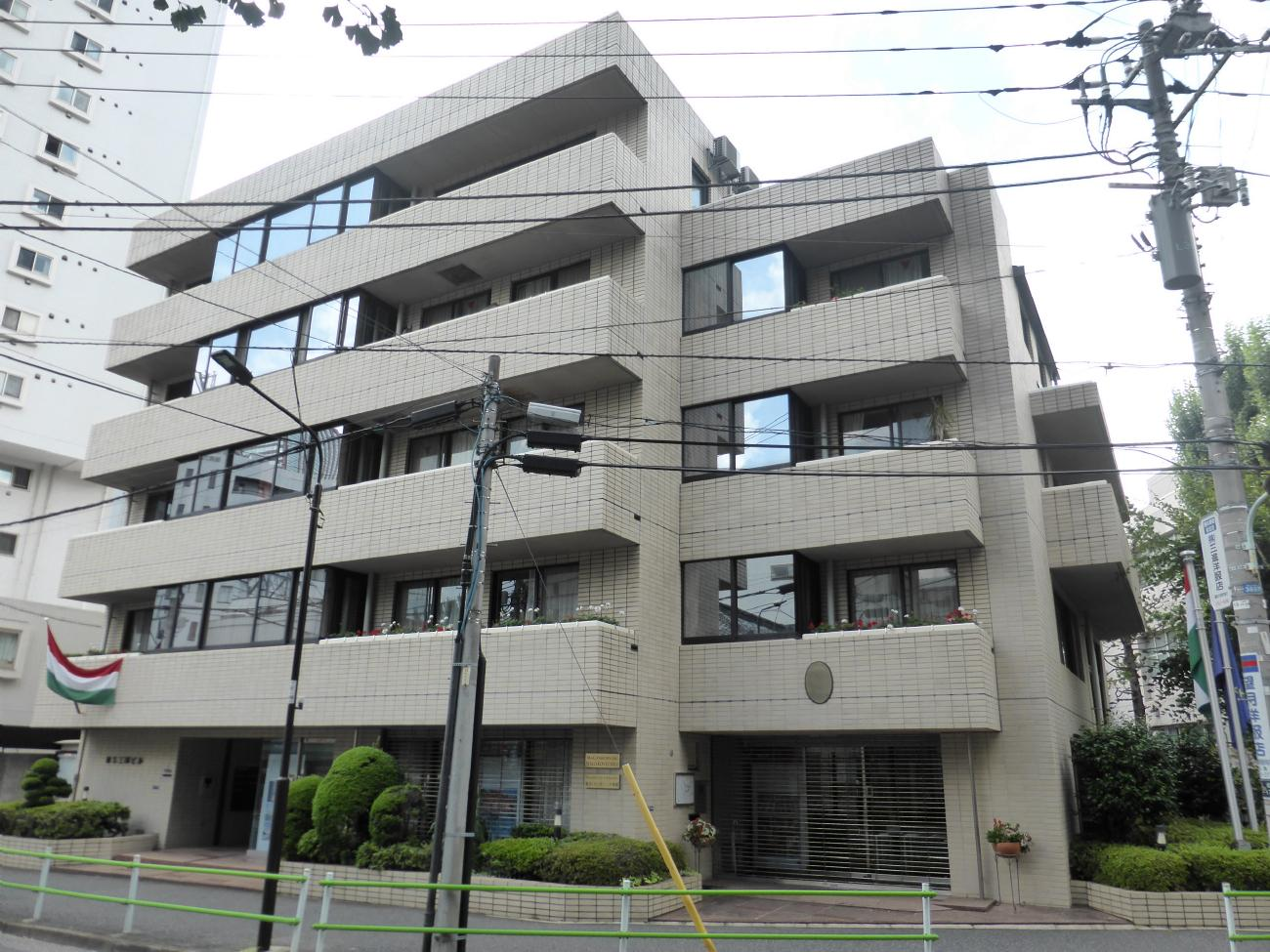
Embassy in Tokyo

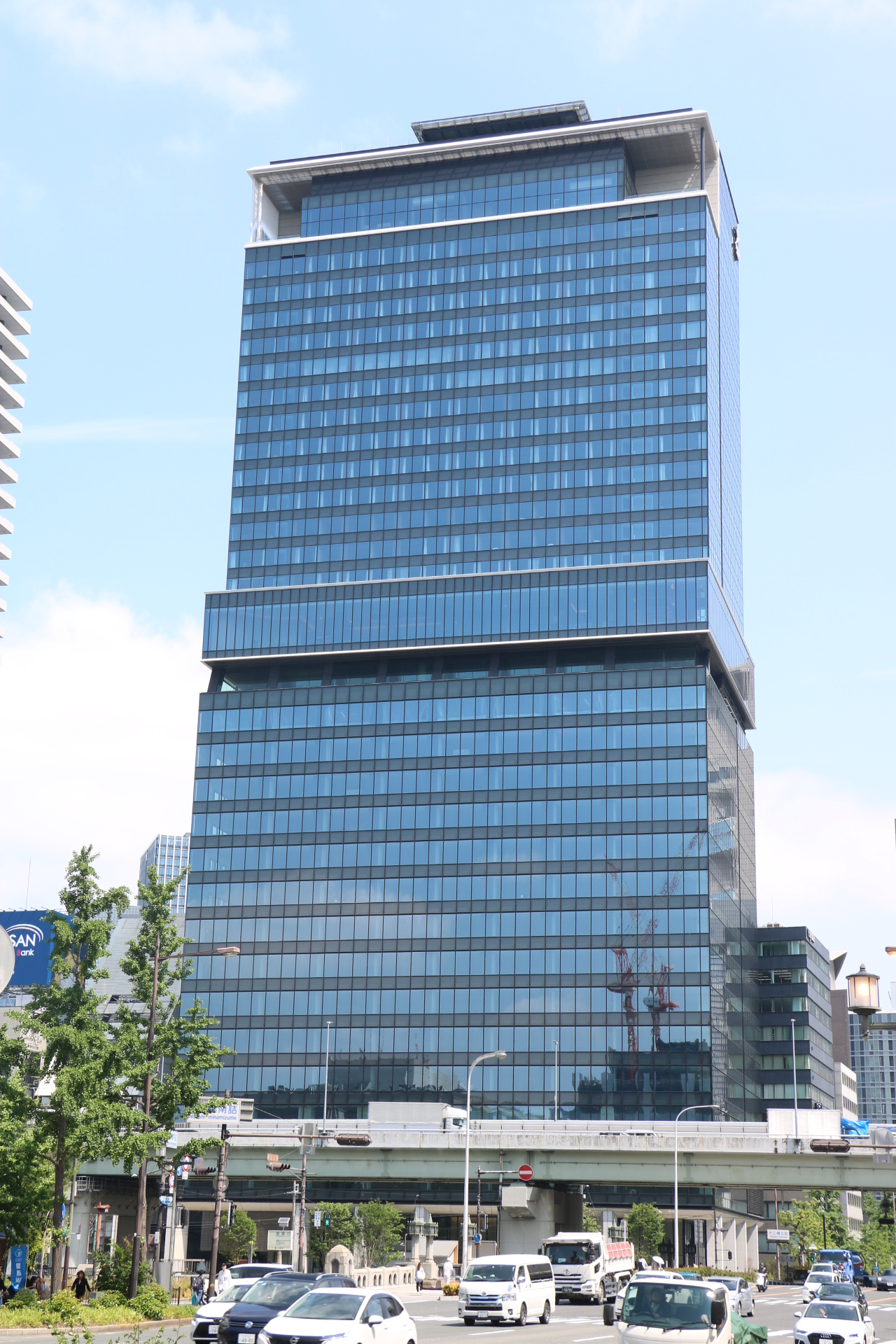
Consulate in Osaka

=== Europe ===
Host country	Host city	Mission	Concurrent accreditation	Ref.
Albania	Tirana	Embassy		
Austria	Vienna	Embassy		
Austria	Innsbruck	Consulate–General		
Belarus	Minsk	Embassy		
Belgium	Brussels	Embassy	Countries: Luxembourg	
Bosnia and Herzegovina	Sarajevo	Embassy		
Bulgaria	Sofia	Embassy		
Croatia	Zagreb	Embassy		
Croatia	Osijek	Consulate-General		
Cyprus	Nicosia	Embassy		
Czech Republic	Prague	Embassy		
Denmark	Copenhagen	Embassy		
Estonia	Tallinn	Embassy		
Finland	Helsinki	Embassy		
France	Paris	Embassy	Countries: Monaco	
France	Lyon	Vice-consulate	Countries: Monaco	
Germany	Berlin	Embassy		
Germany	Düsseldorf	Consulate–General		
Germany	Munich	Consulate–General		
Germany	Stuttgart	Consulate–General		
Greece	Athens	Embassy		
Holy See	Rome	Embassy	Sovereign Entity: Sovereign Military Order of Malta	
Ireland	Dublin	Embassy		
Italy	Rome	Embassy	Countries: Malta; San Marino	
Italy	Milan	Consulate-General	Countries: Malta; San Marino	
Kosovo	Pristina	Embassy		
Latvia	Riga	Embassy		
Lithuania	Vilnius	Embassy		
Luxembourg	Luxembourg City	Embassy office (Note: Subordinate to the Hungarian embassy in Brussels, Belgium.)		
Malta	Valletta	Embassy office (Note: Subordinate to the Hungarian embassy in Rome, Italy.)		
Moldova	Chişinău	Embassy		
Montenegro	Podgorica	Embassy		
Netherlands	The Hague	Embassy	International Organizations: OPCW	
North Macedonia	Skopje	Embassy		
Norway	Oslo	Embassy	Countries: Iceland	
Poland	Warsaw	Embassy		
Poland	Gdańsk	Consulate–General		
Poland	Kraków	Consulate–General		
Poland	Wrocław	Vice-Consulate		
Portugal	Lisbon	Embassy	Countries: Cape Verde; Guinea-Bissau	
Romania	Bucharest	Embassy		
Romania	Cluj-Napoca	Consulate-General		
Romania	Miercurea Ciuc	Consulate-General		
Russia	Moscow	Embassy		
Russia	Kazan	Consulate–General		
Russia	Saint Petersburg	Consulate–General		
Russia	Yekaterinburg	Consulate–General		
Serbia	Belgrade	Embassy		
Serbia	Subotica	Consulate–General		
Slovakia	Bratislava	Embassy		
Slovakia	Košice	Consulate-General		
Slovakia	Banská Bystrica	Vice-consulate		
Slovenia	Ljubljana	Embassy		
Slovenia	Lendava	Consulate–General		
Spain	Madrid	Embassy	Countries: Andorra	
Spain	Barcelona	Consulate-General	Countries: Andorra	
Spain	Málaga	Embassy office	Countries: Andorra	
Sweden	Stockholm	Embassy		
Switzerland	Bern	Embassy	Countries: Liechtenstein	
Switzerland	Geneva	Consulate	Countries: Liechtenstein	
Ukraine	Kyiv	Embassy		
Ukraine	Uzhhorod	Consulate-General		
Ukraine	Berehove	Consulate		
United Kingdom	London	Embassy		
United Kingdom	Edinburgh	Consulate-General		
United Kingdom	Manchester	Consulate-General		

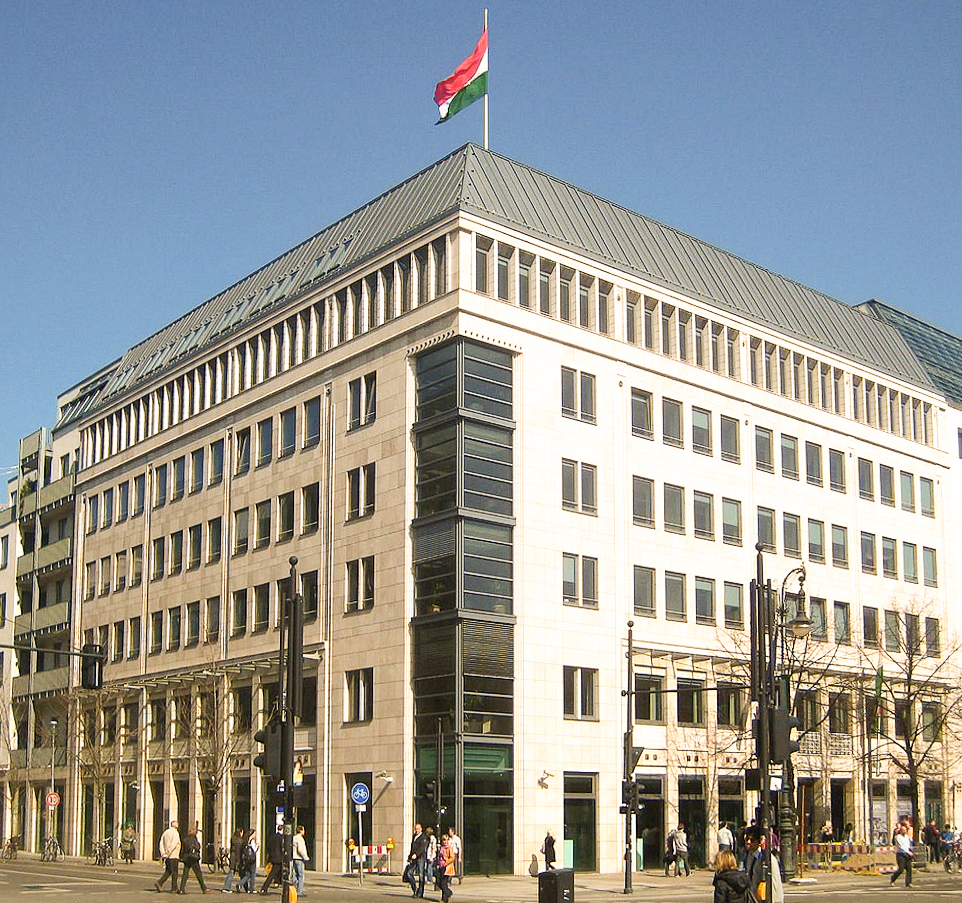
Embassy in Berlin

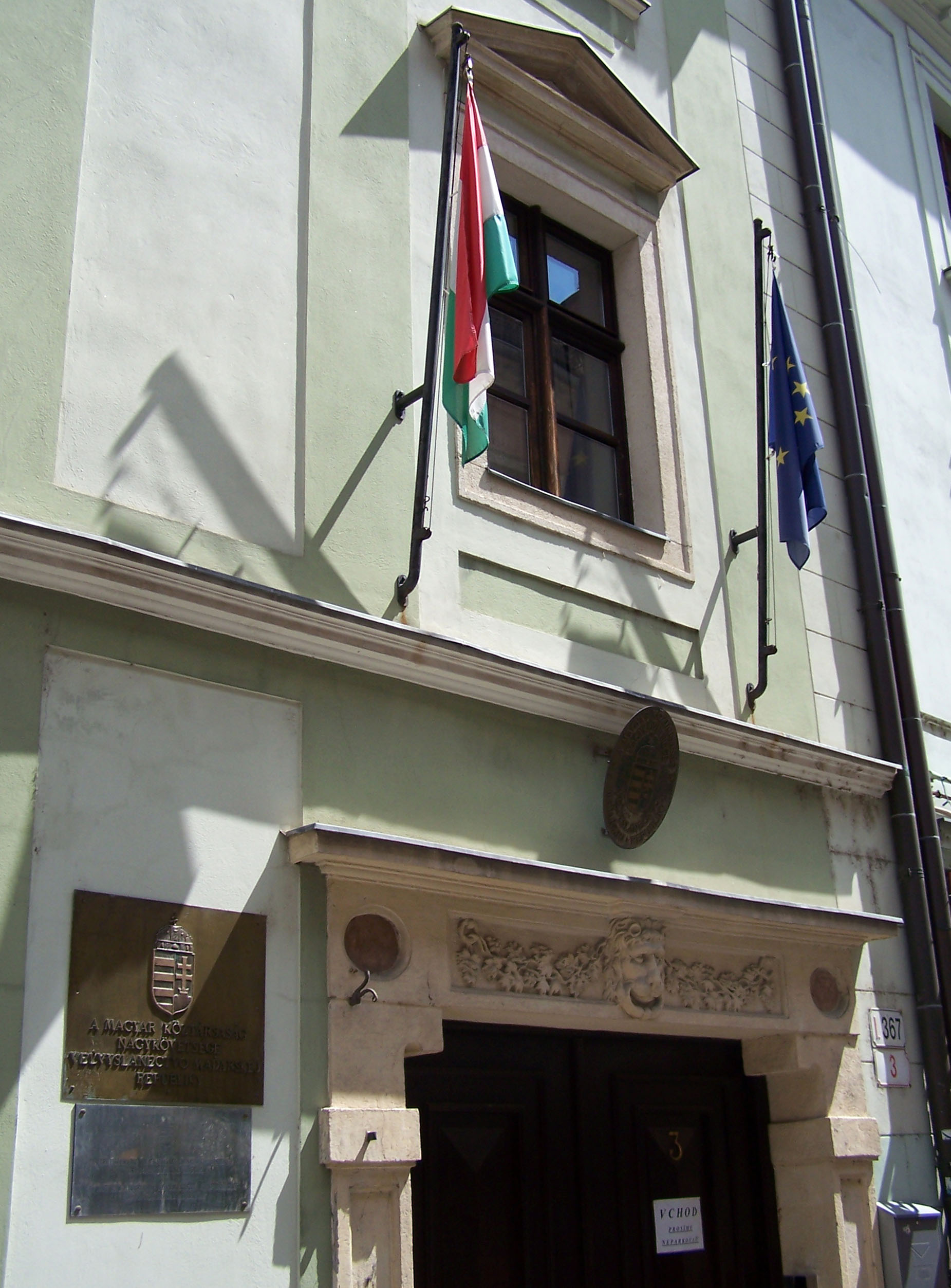
Embassy in Bratislava

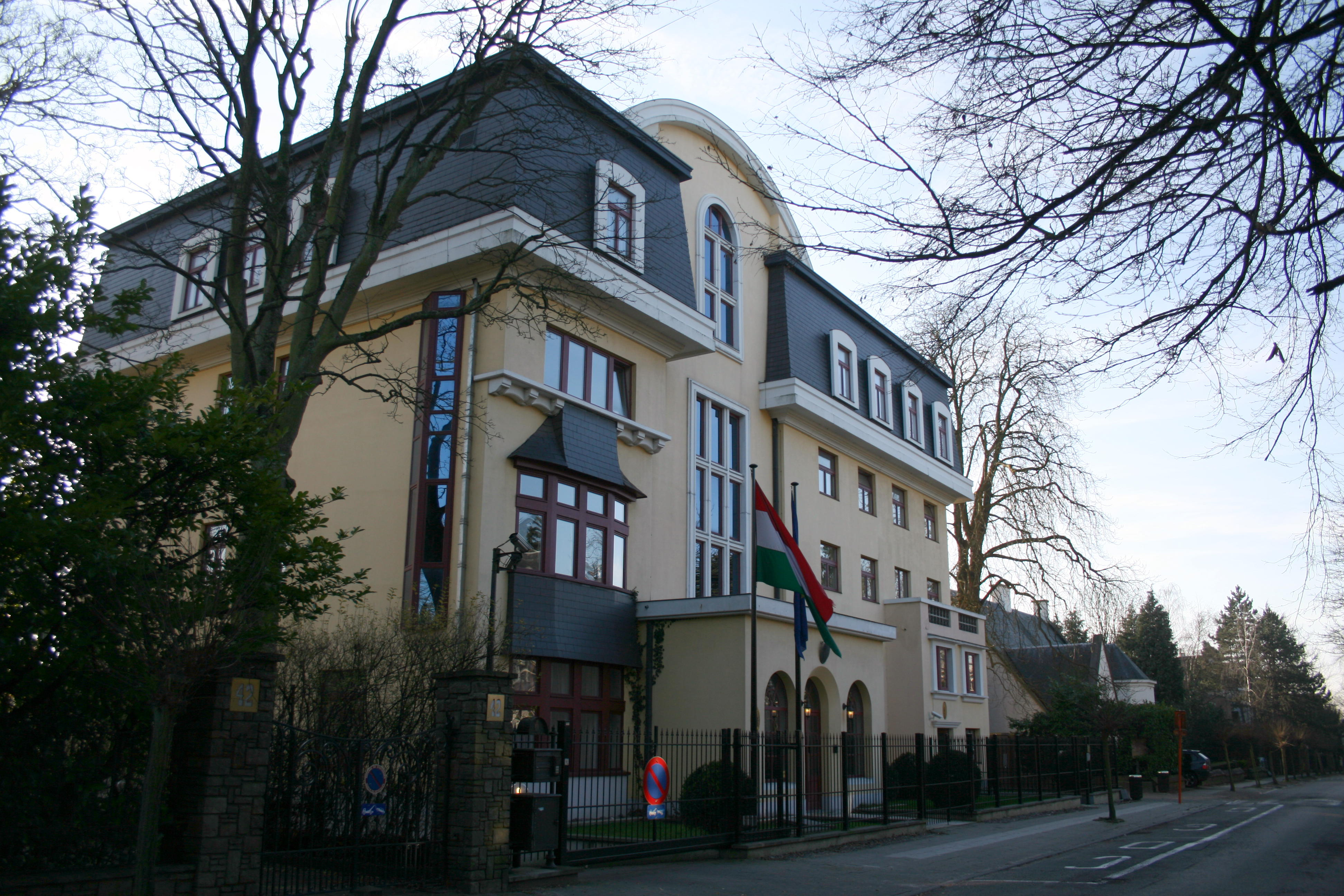
Embassy in Brussels

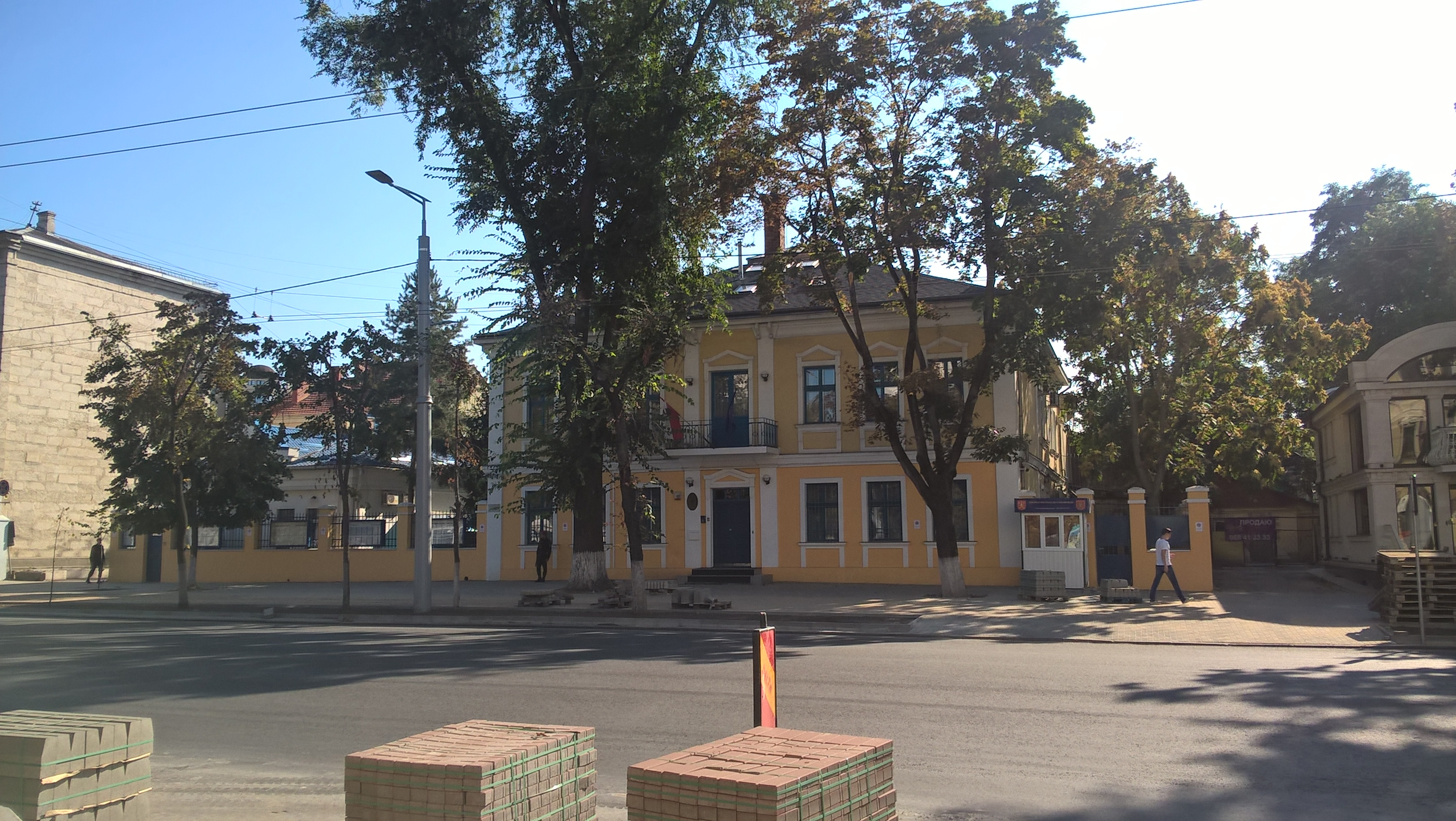
Embassy in Chişinău

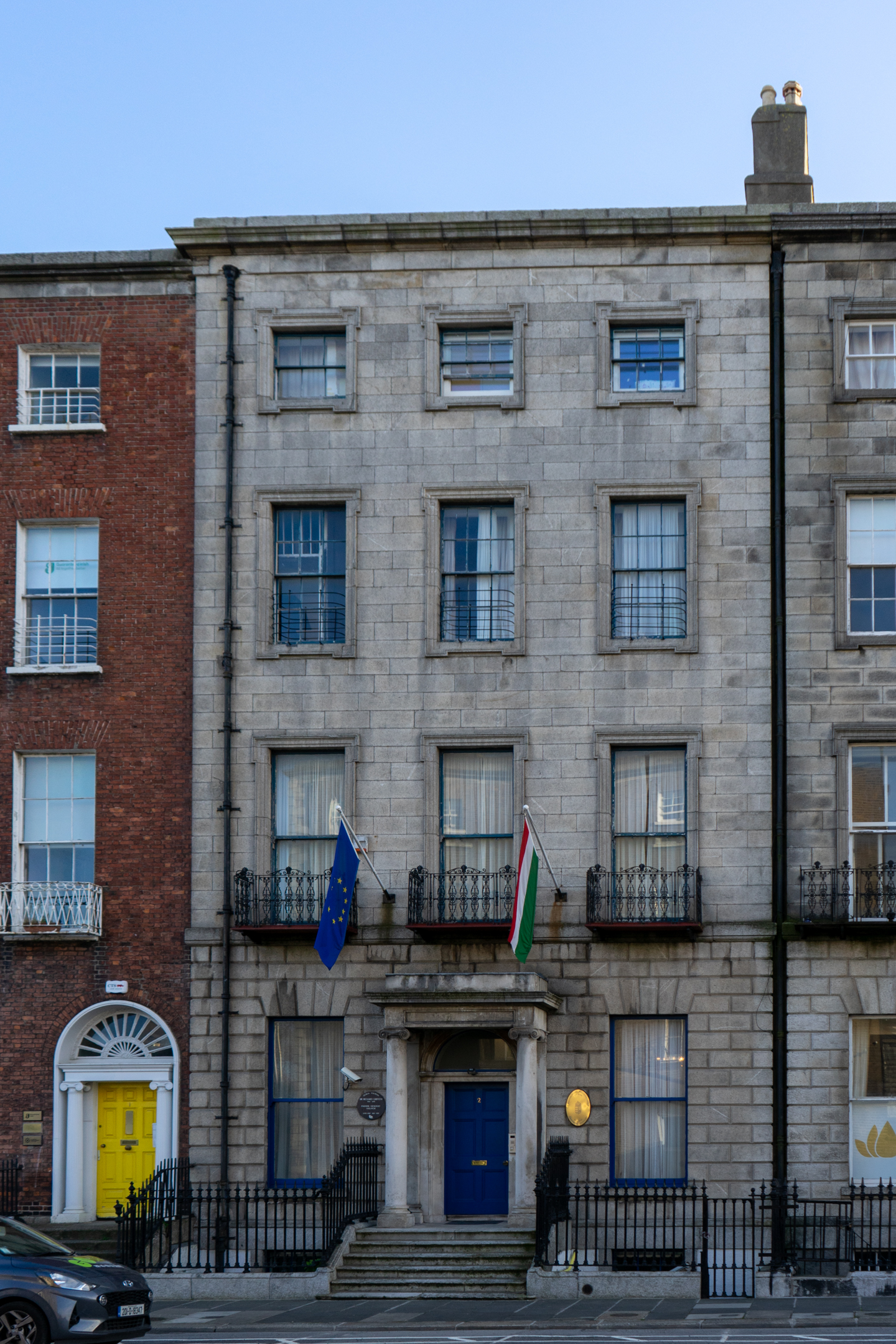
Embassy in Dublin

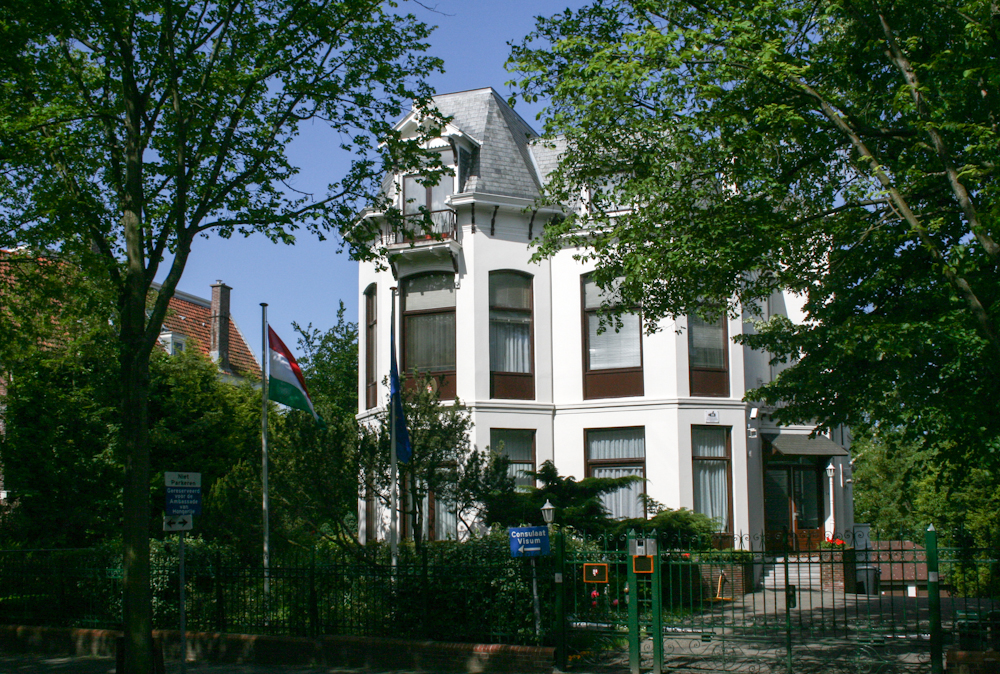
Embassy in The Hague

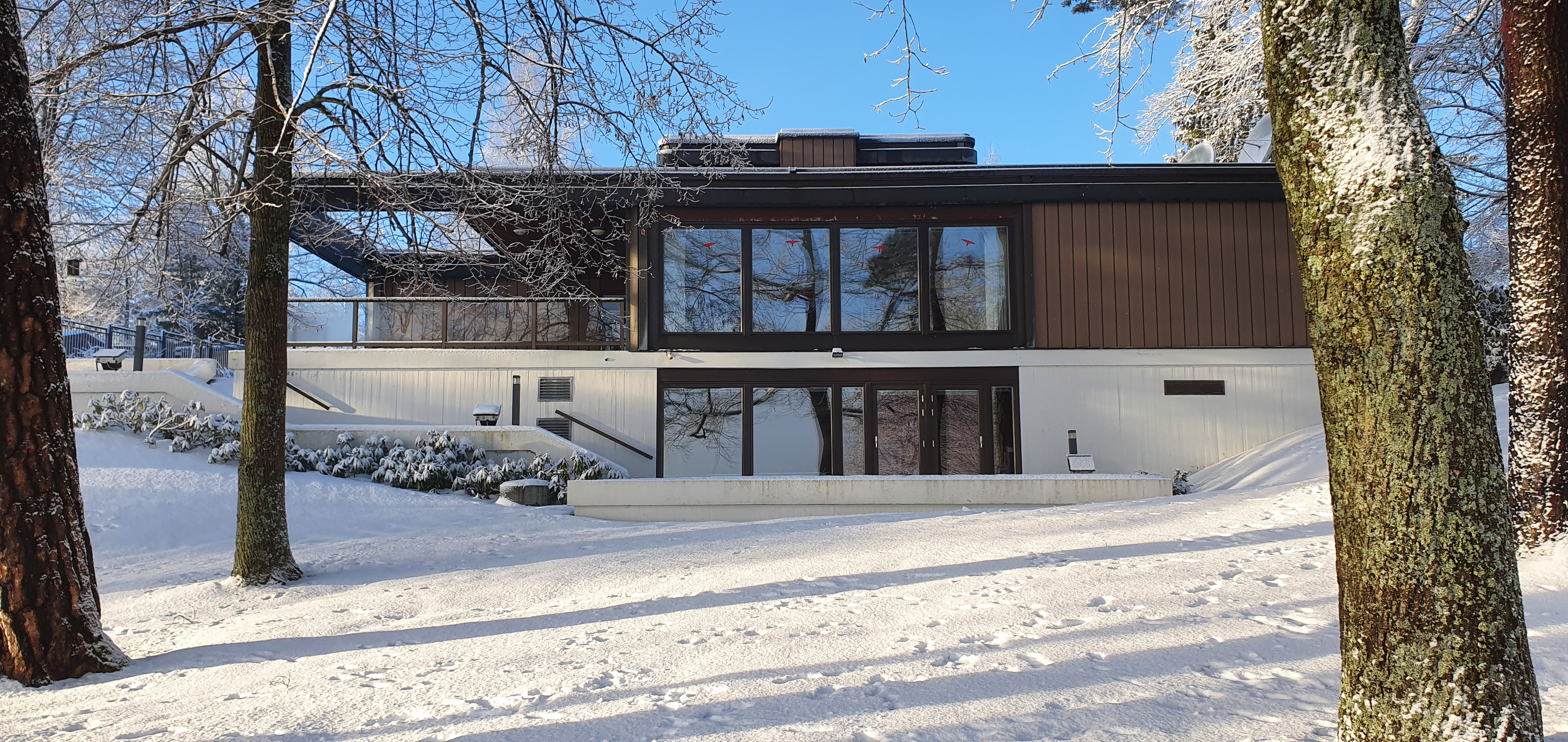
Embassy in Helsinki

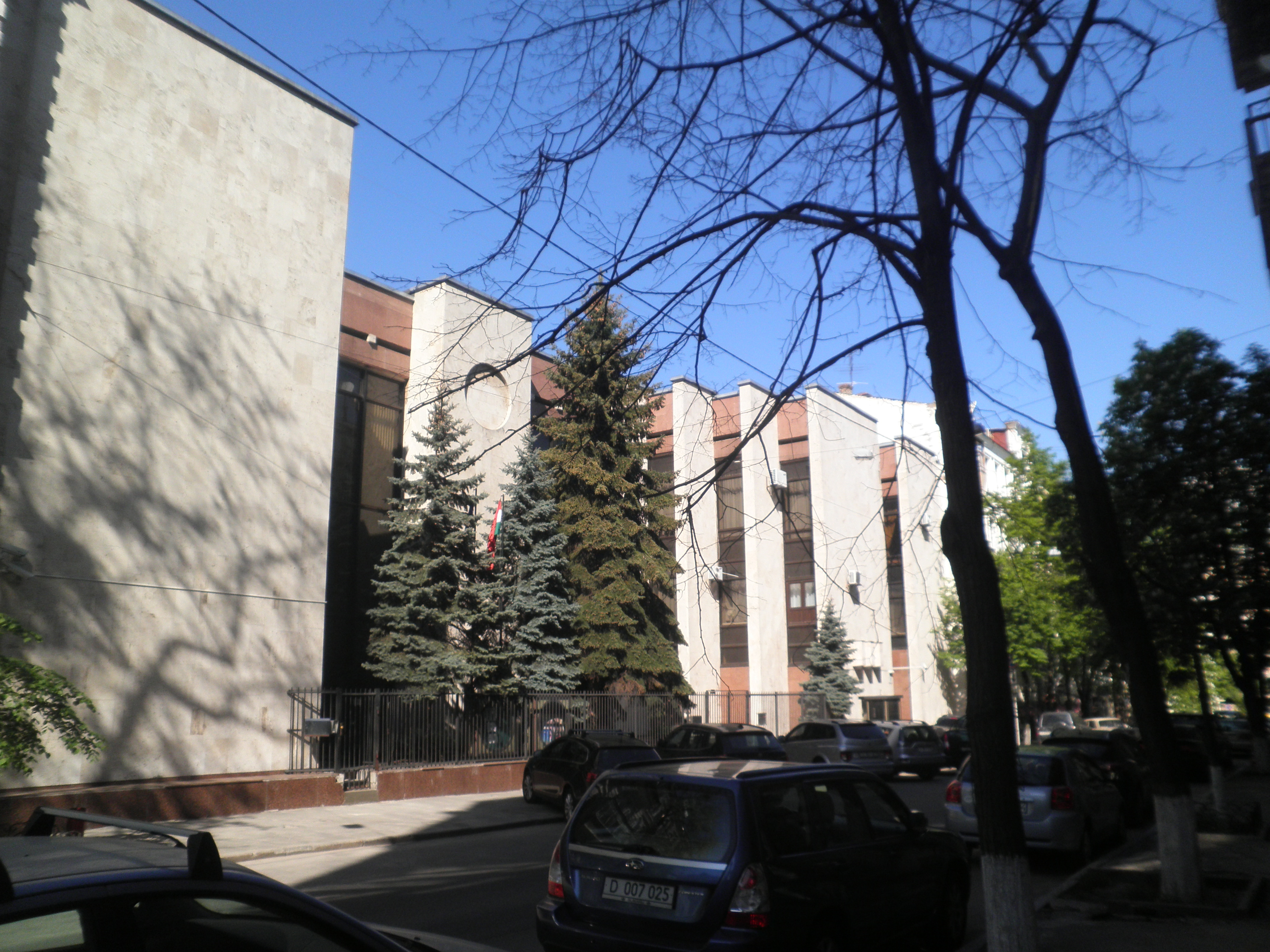
Embassy in Kyiv

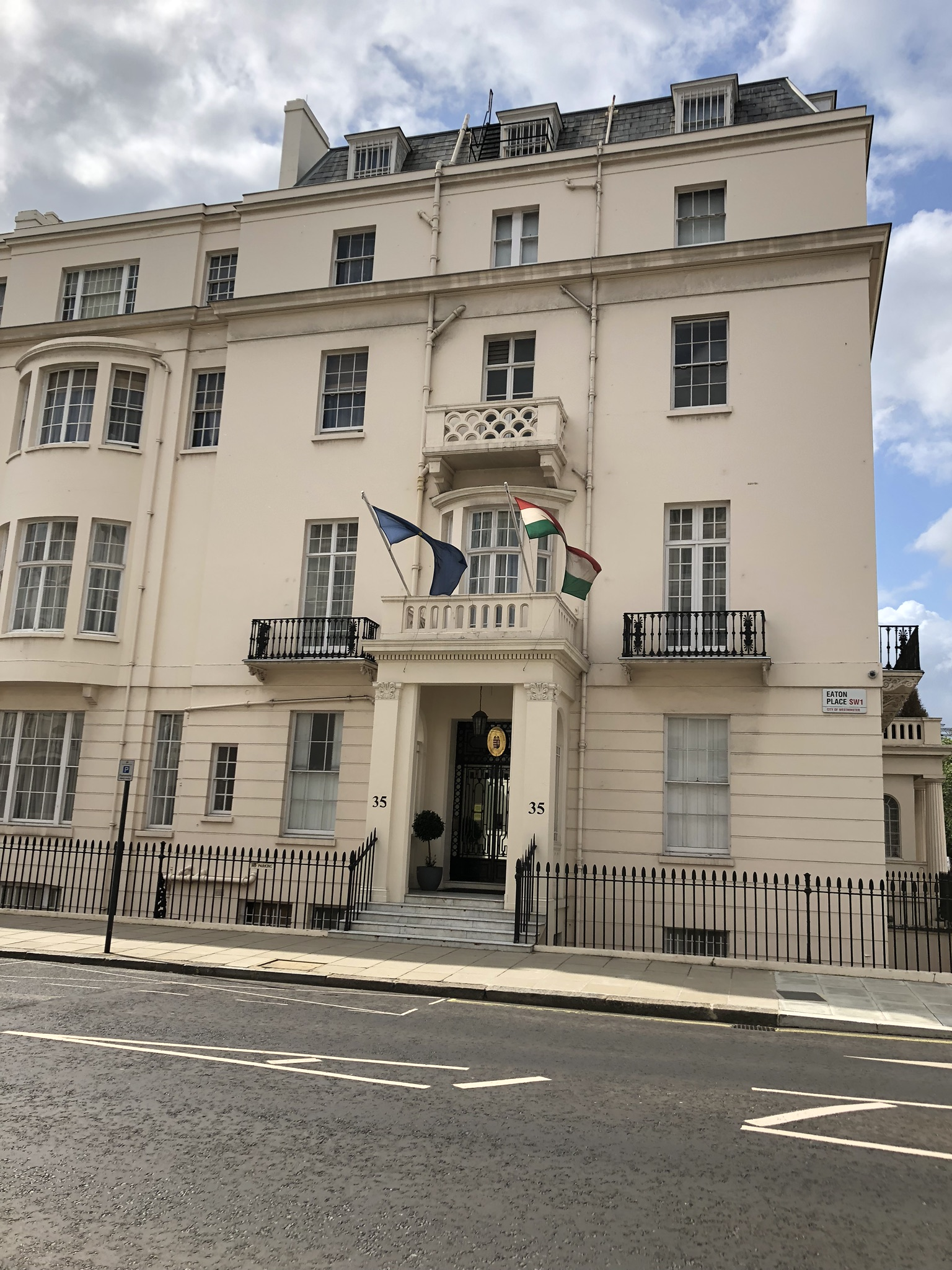
Embassy in London

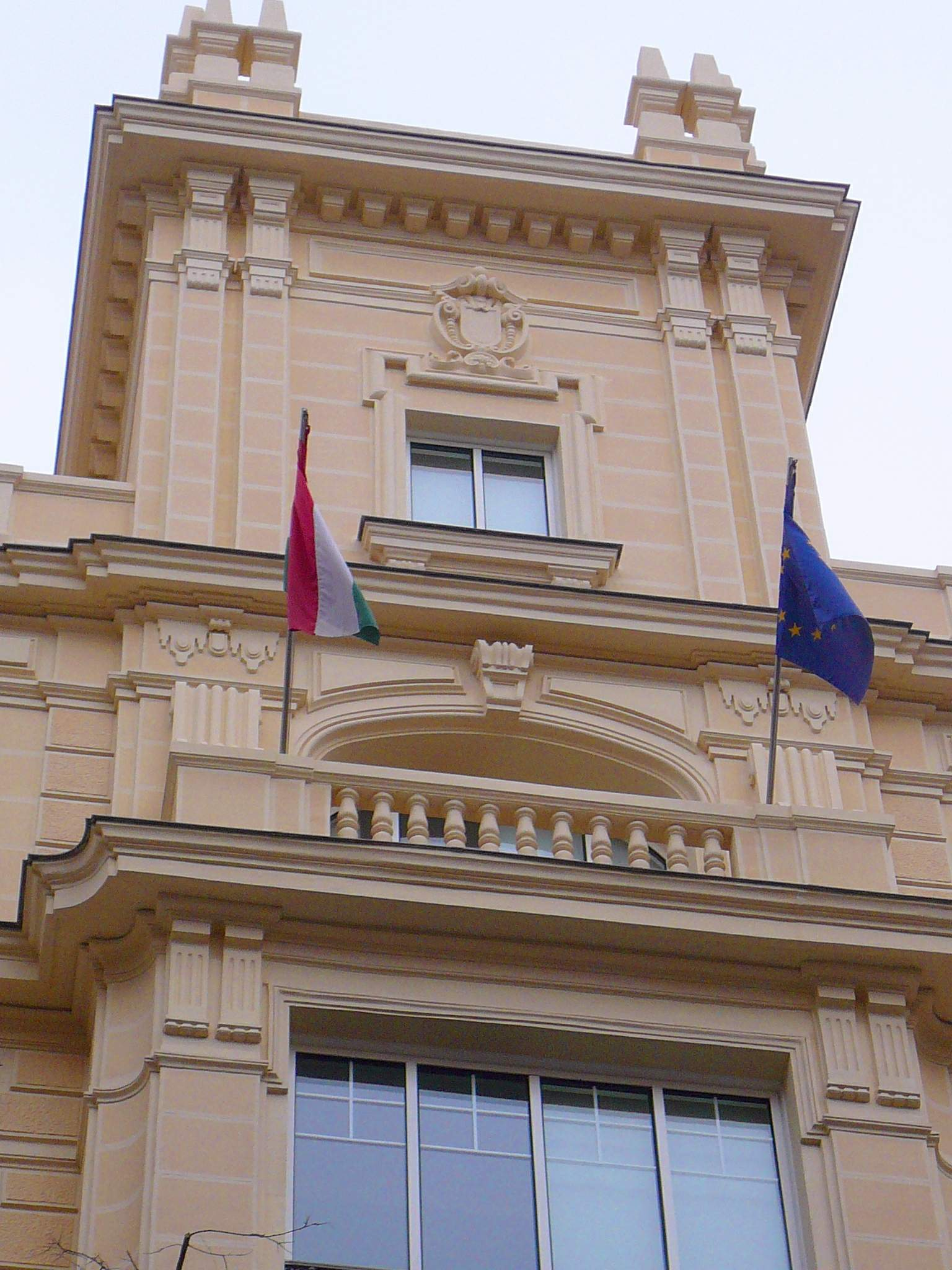
Embassy in Madrid

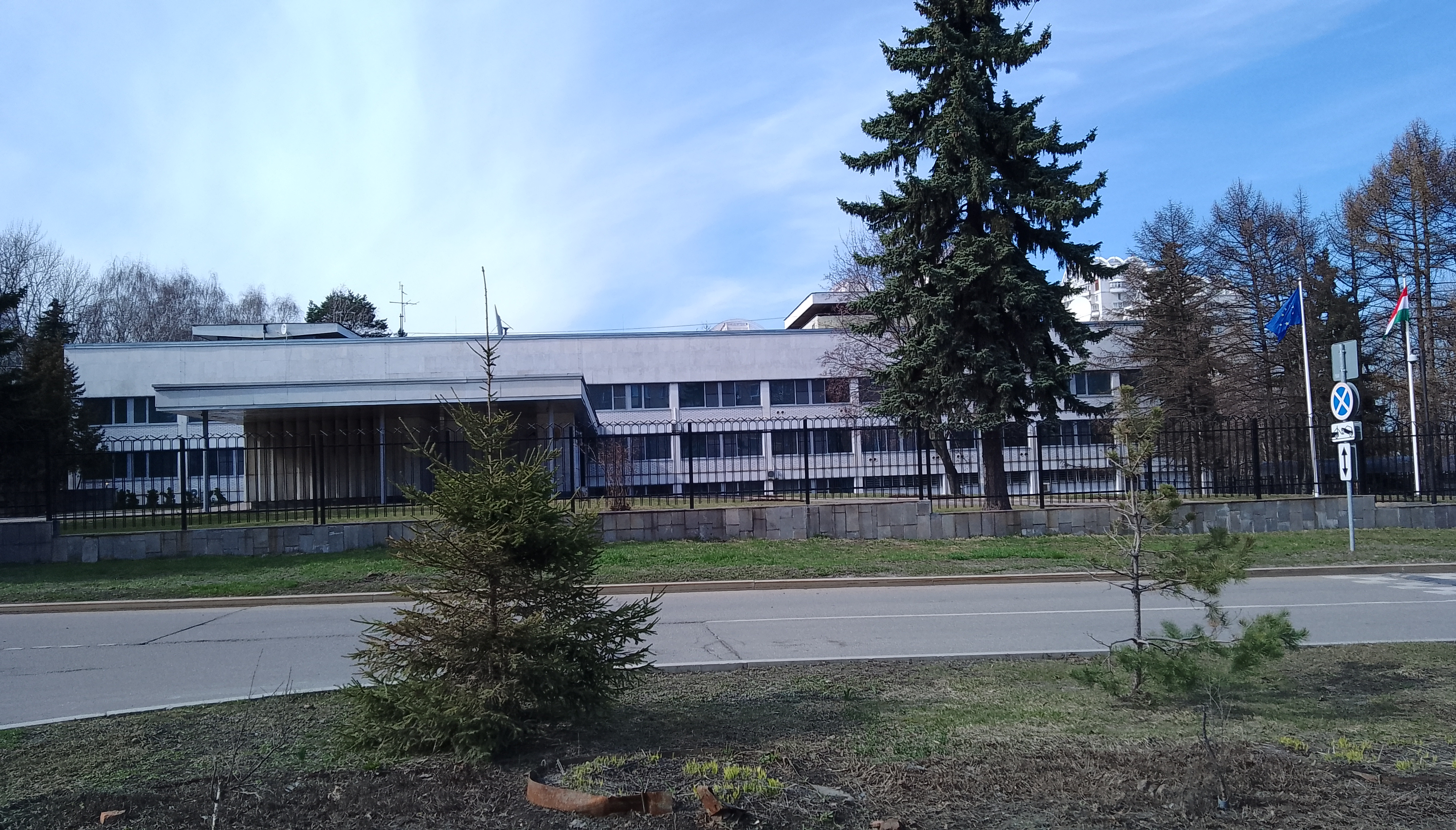
Embassy in Moscow

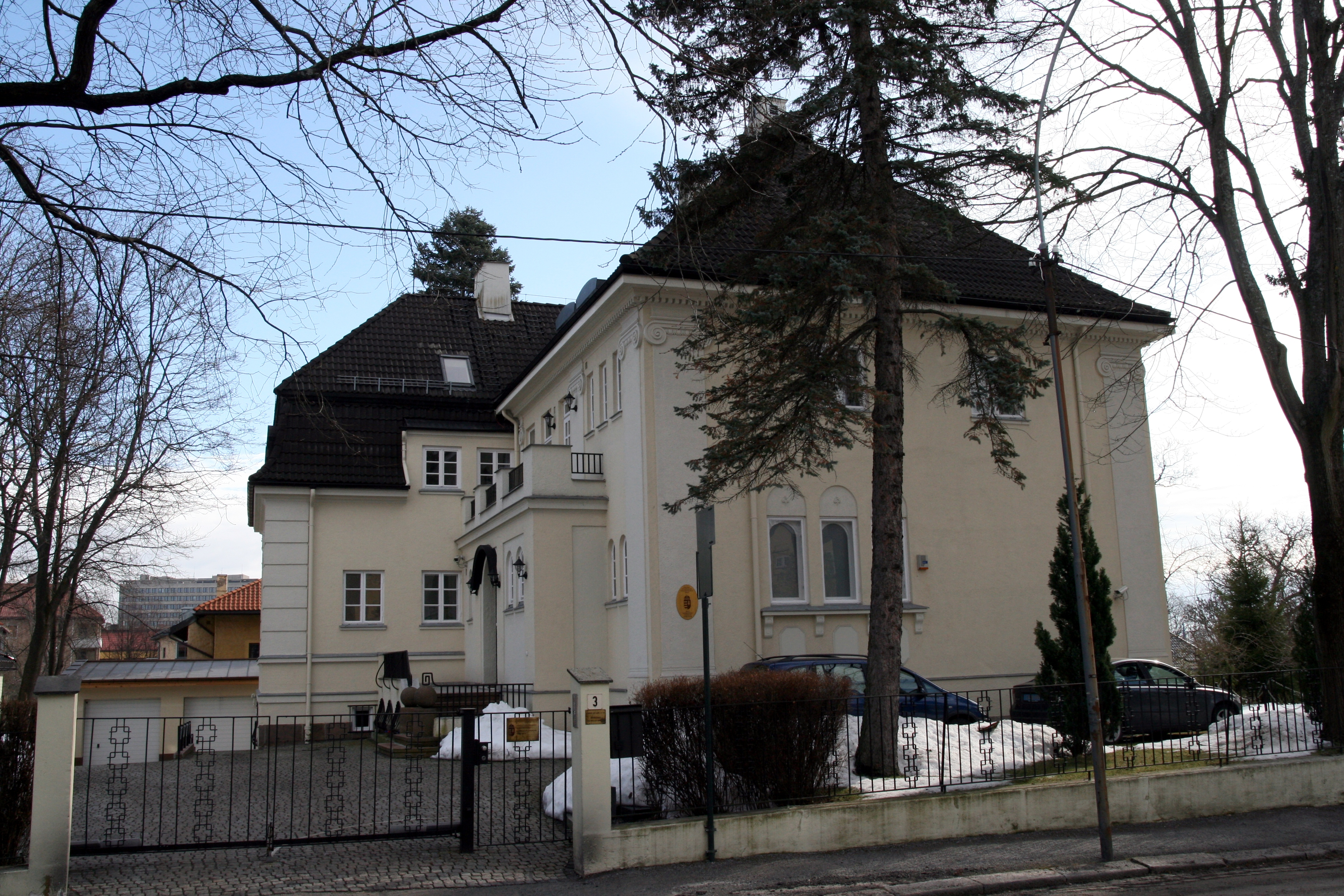
Embassy in Oslo

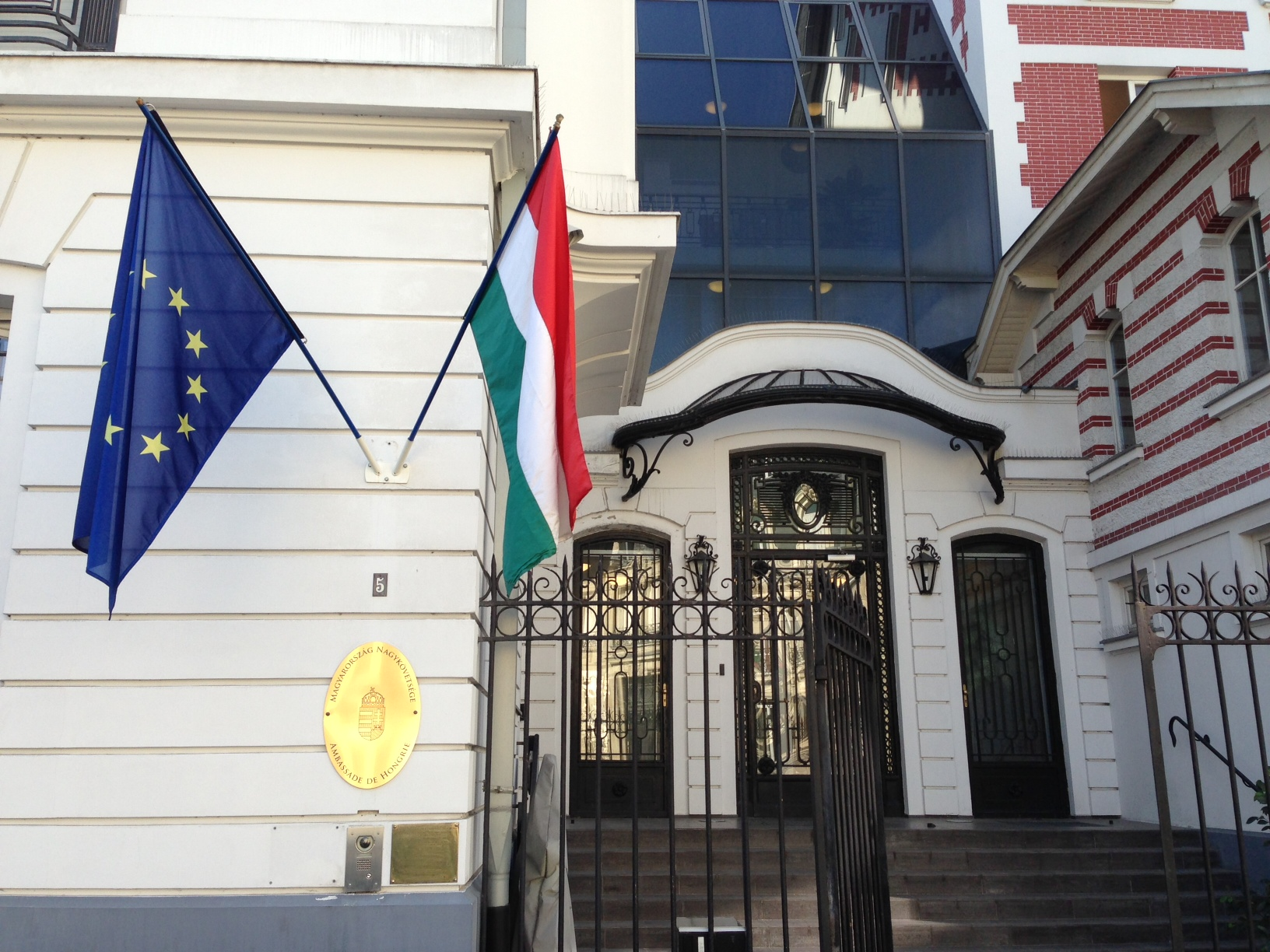
Embassy in Paris

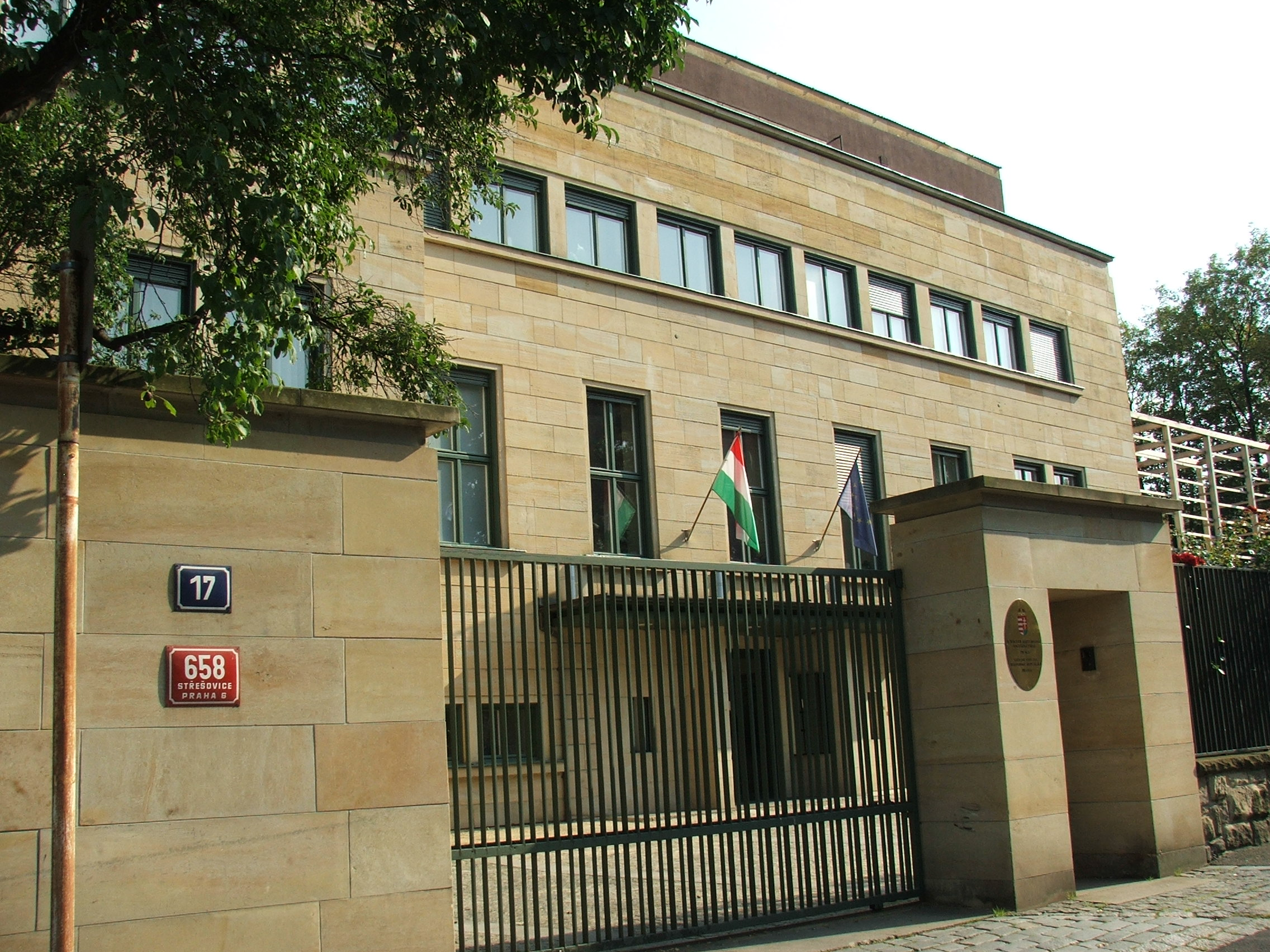
Embassy in Prague

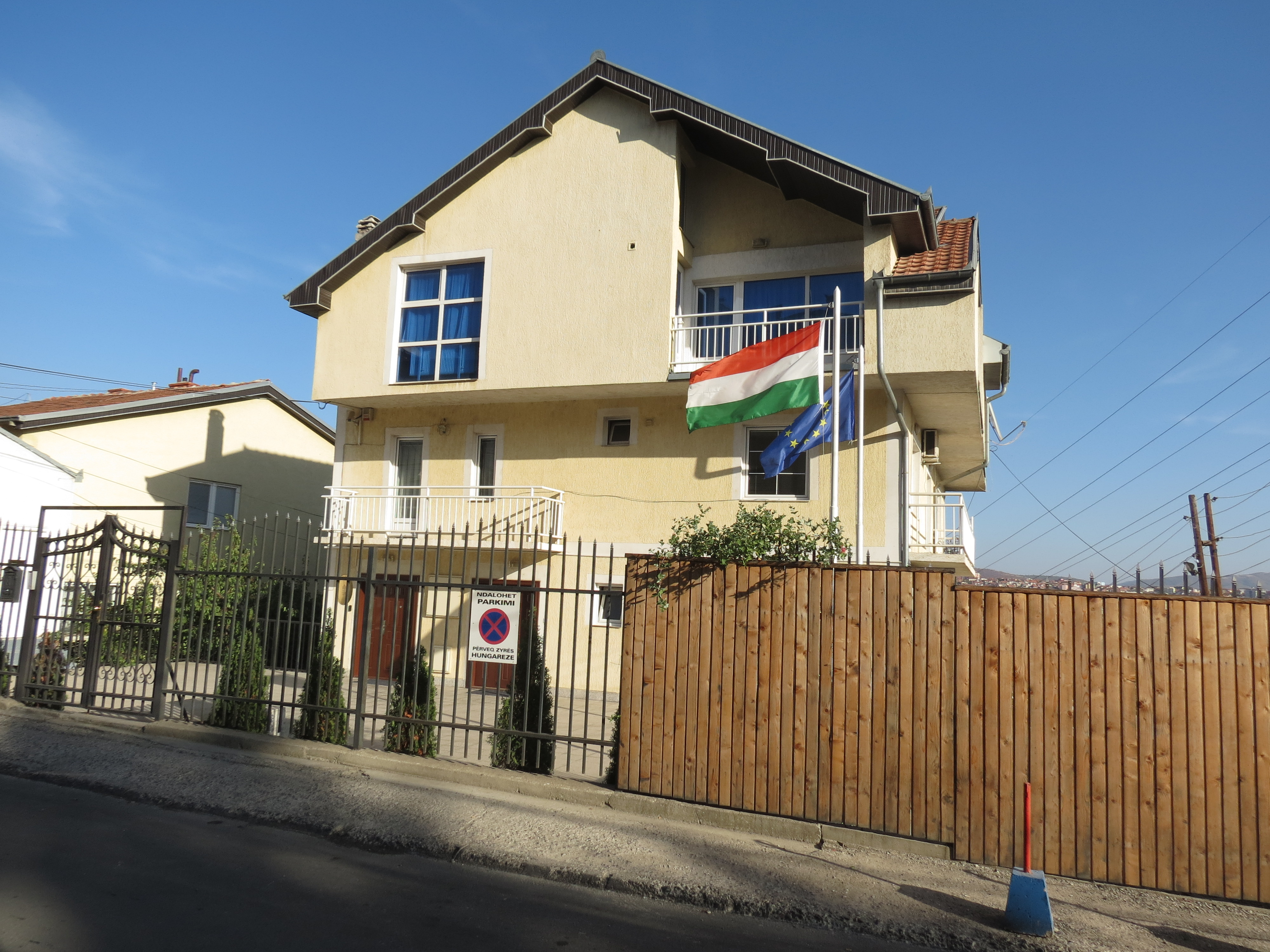
Embassy in Pristina

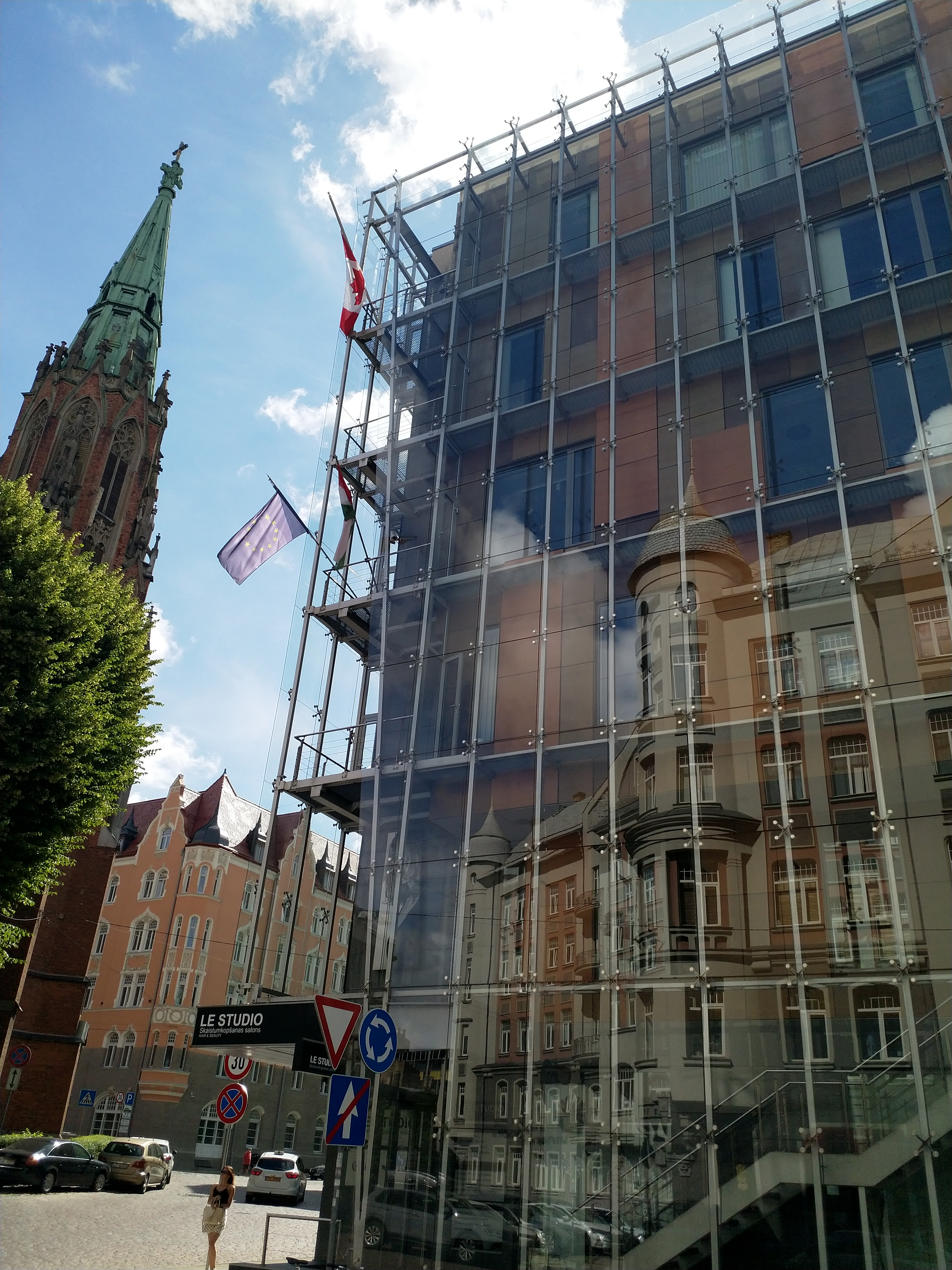
Embassy in Riga

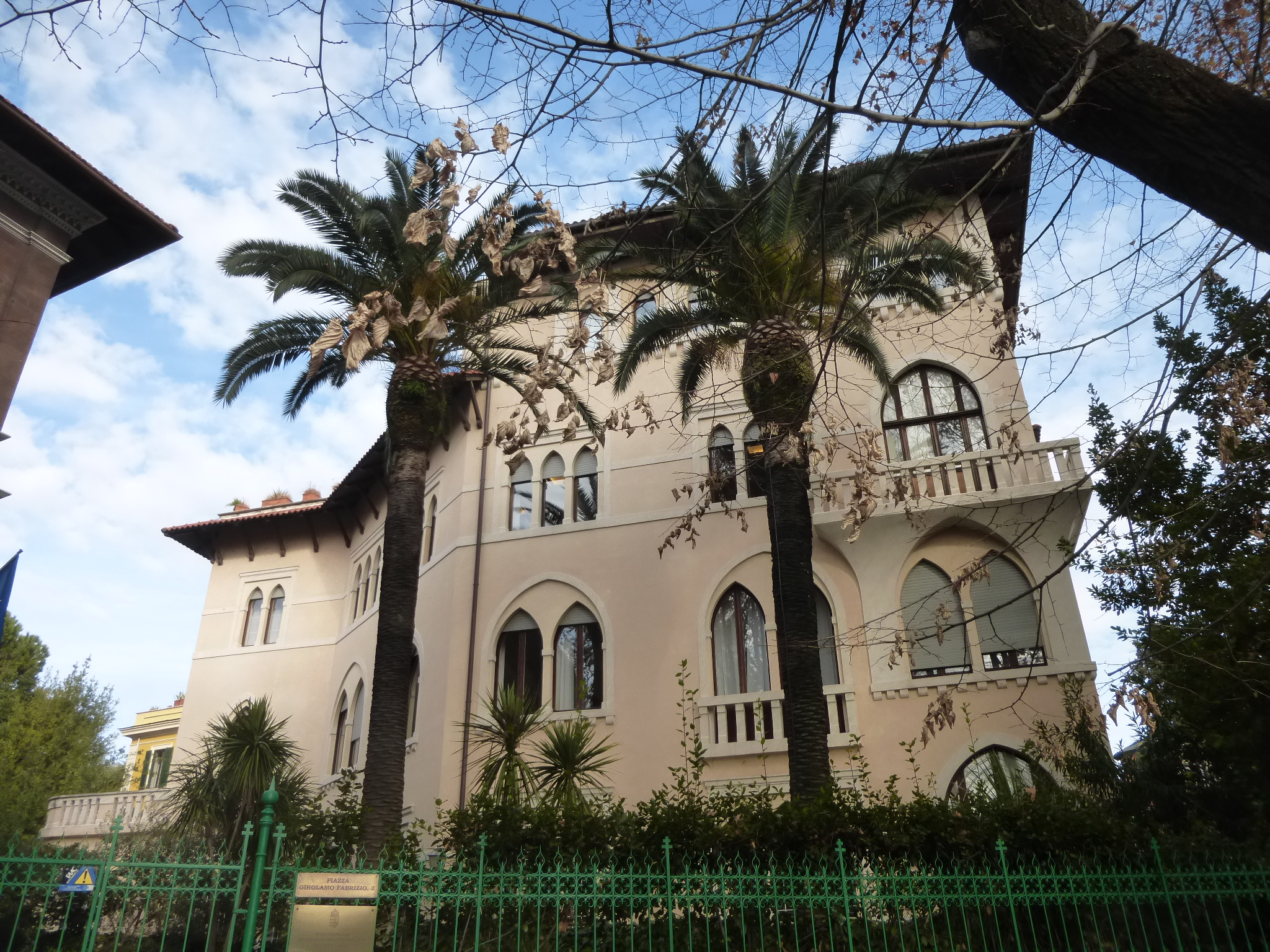
Embassy to the Holy See in Rome

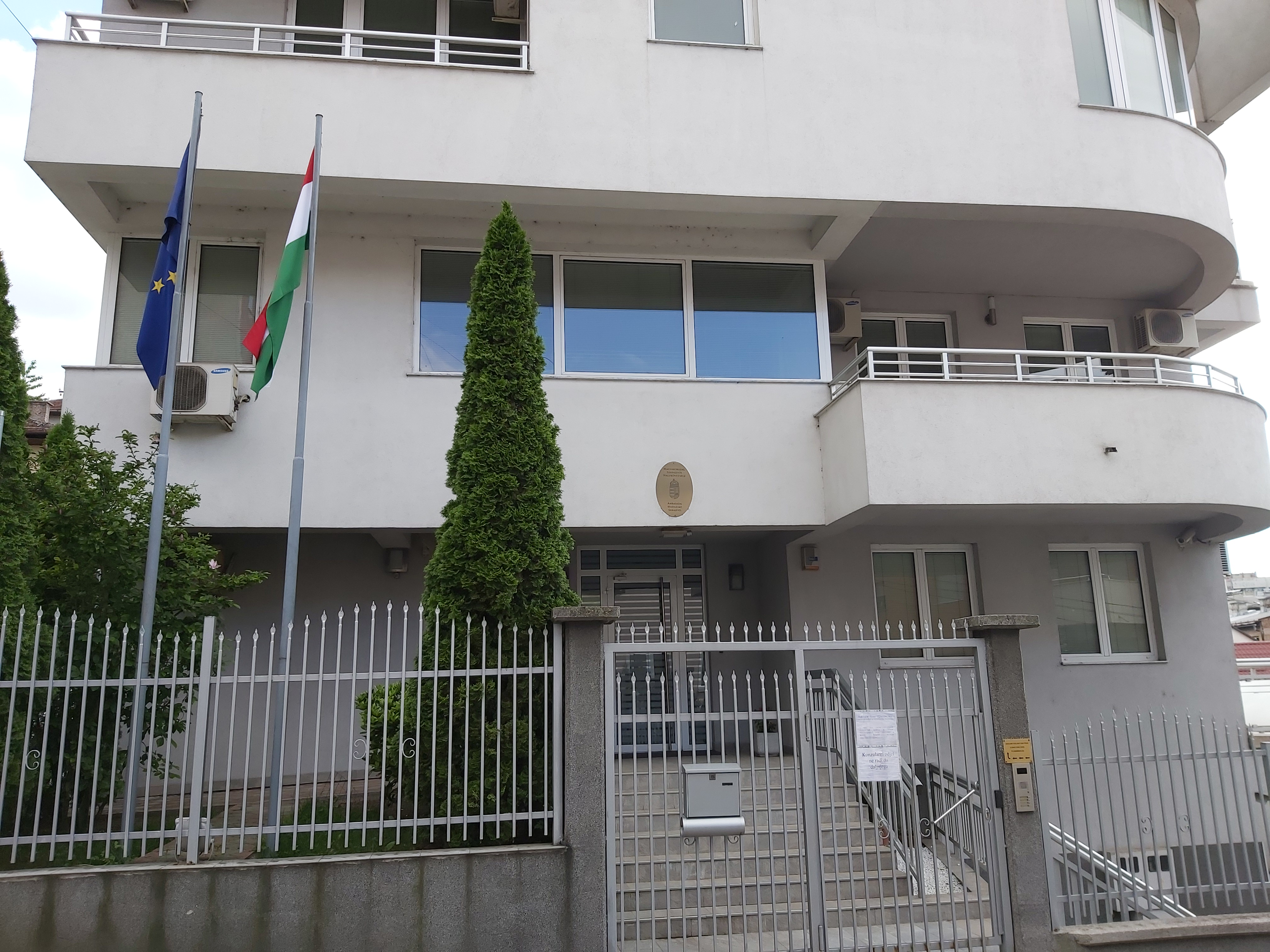
Embassy in Sarajevo

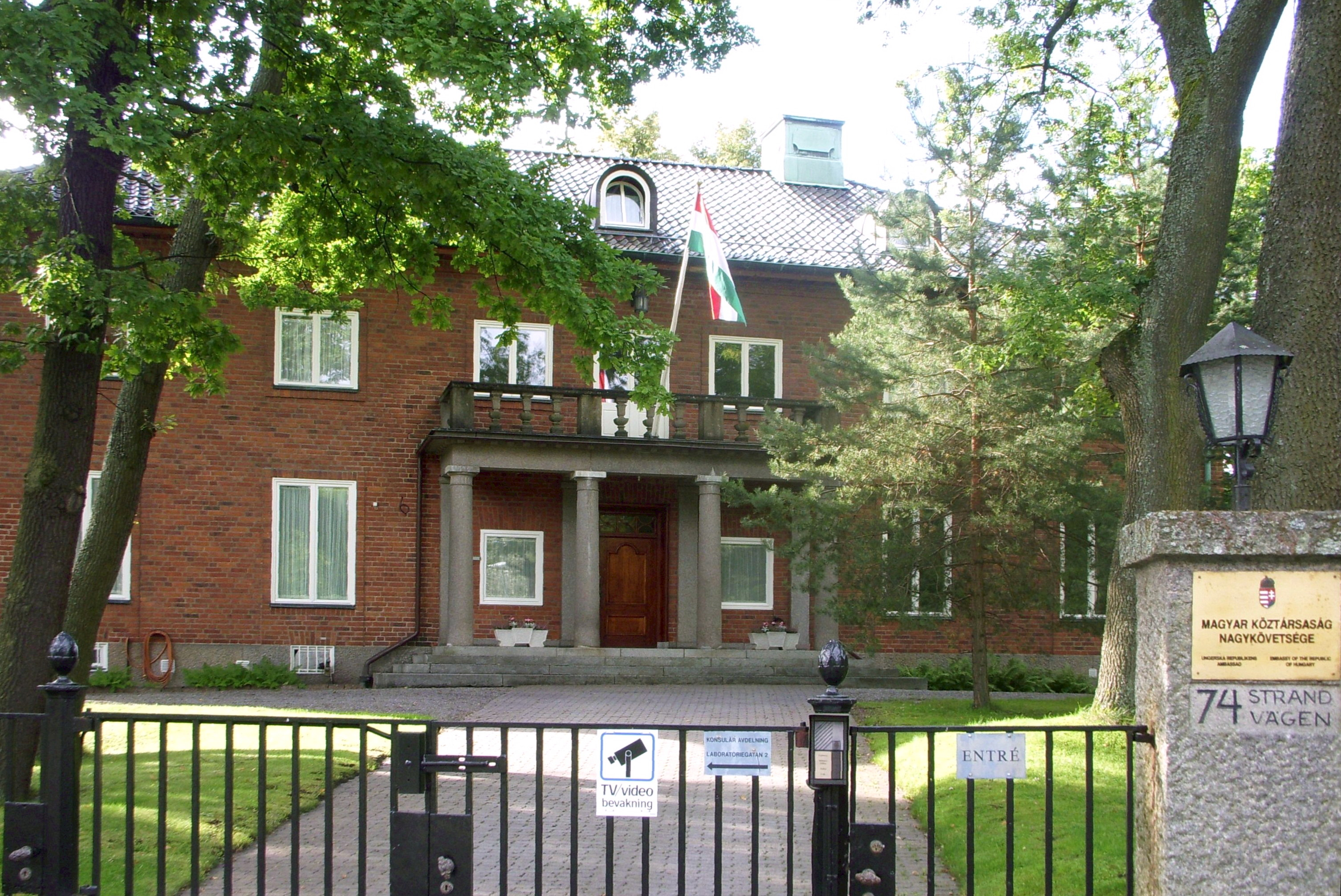
Embassy in Stockholm

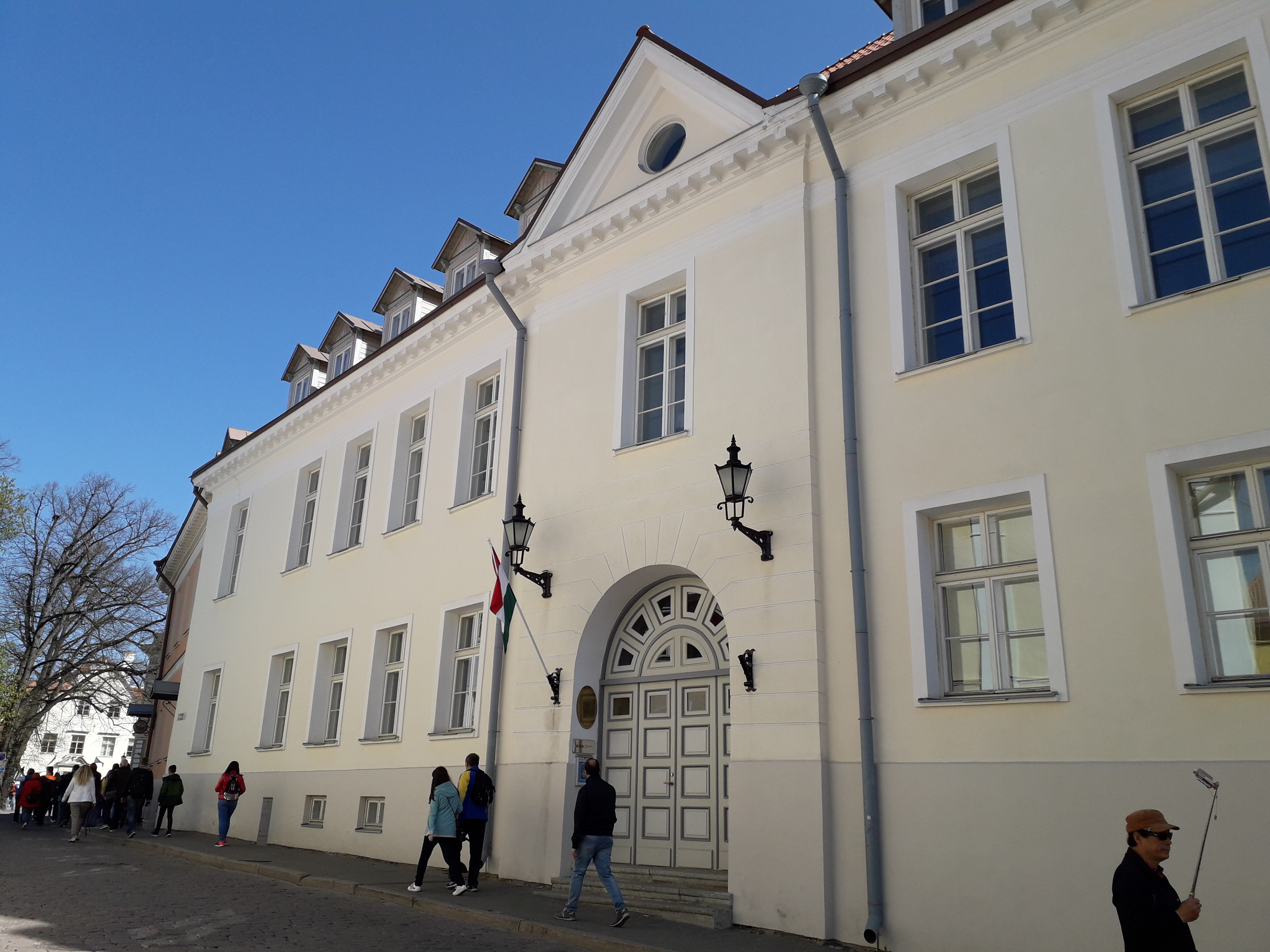
Embassy in Tallinn

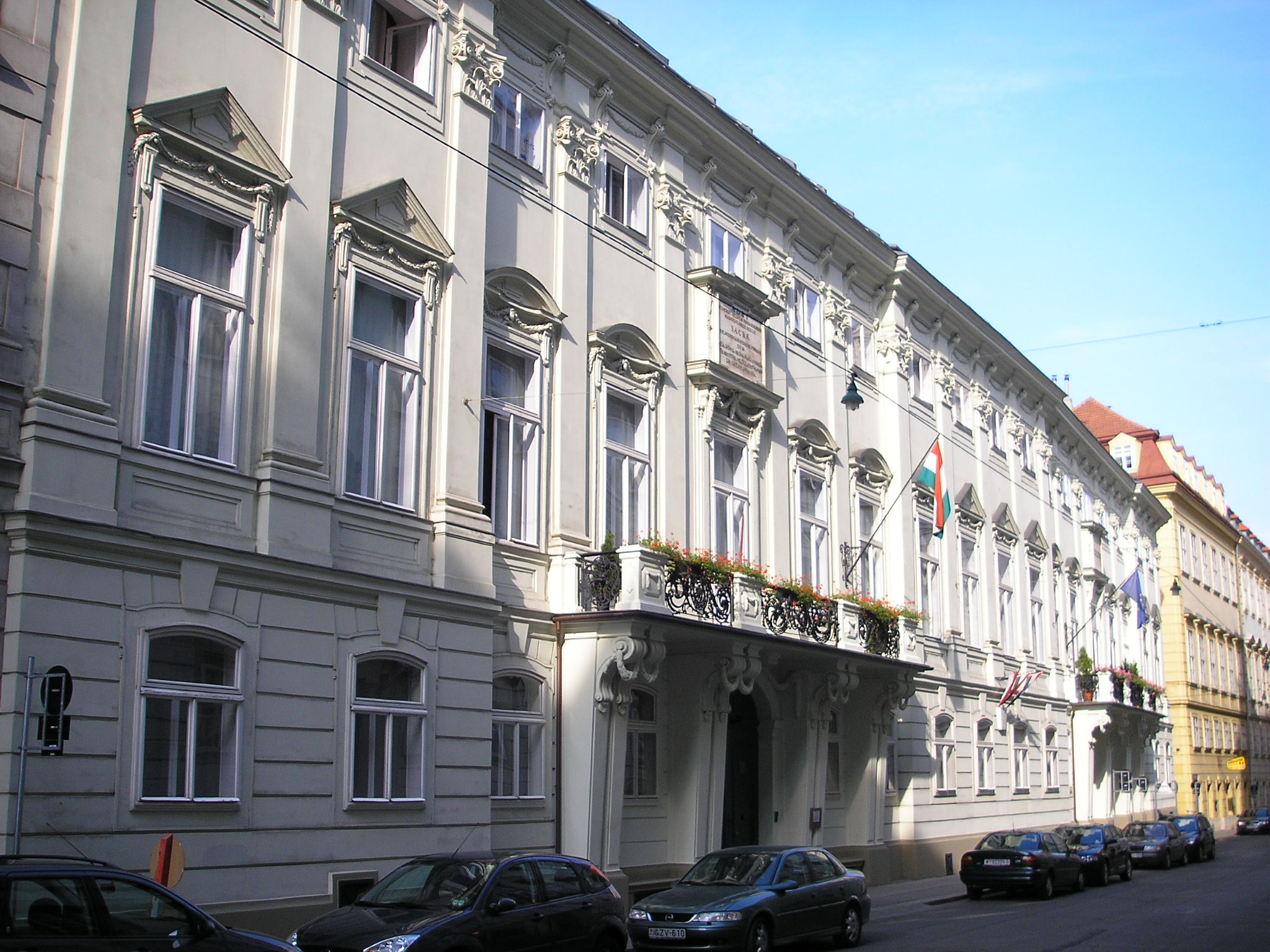
Embassy in Vienna

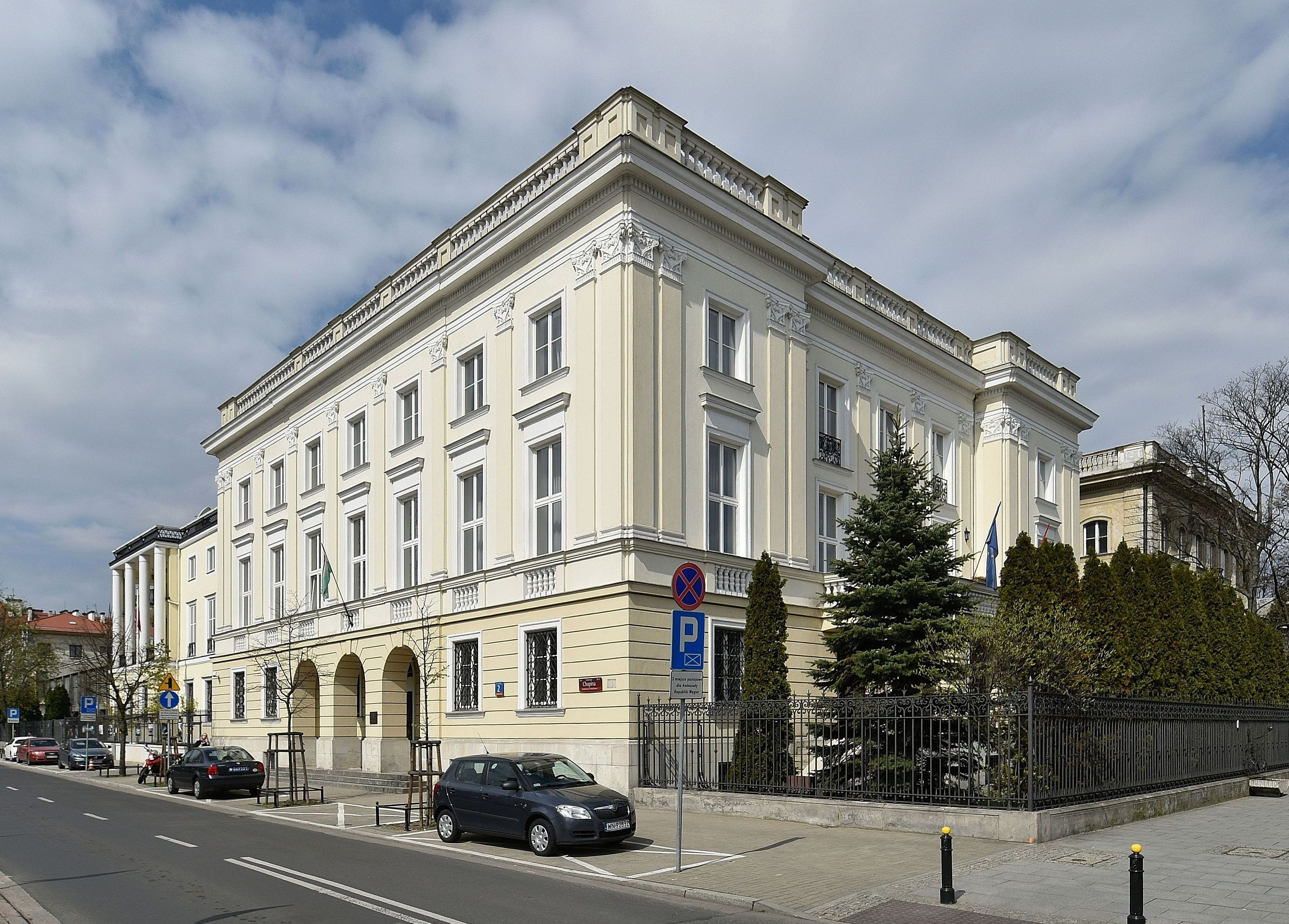
Embassy in Warsaw

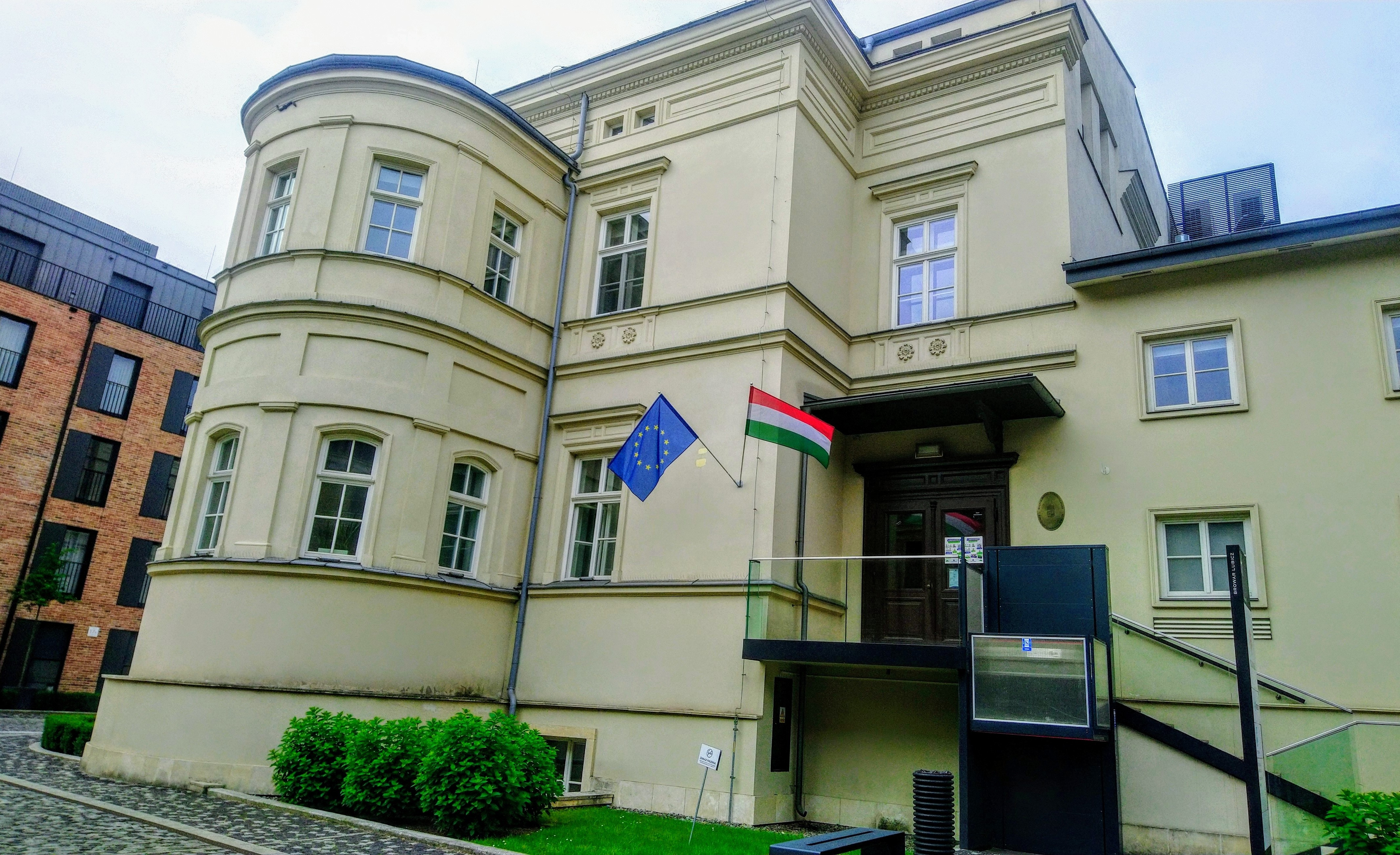
Consulate General in Krakow

=== Oceania ===
Host country	Host city	Mission	Concurrent accreditation	Ref.
Australia	Canberra	Embassy	Countries: Papua New Guinea; Solomon Islands; Vanuatu	
Australia	Melbourne	Consular office	Countries: Papua New Guinea; Solomon Islands; Vanuatu	
Australia	Sydney	Consular office	Countries: Papua New Guinea; Solomon Islands; Vanuatu	
New Zealand	Wellington	Embassy	Countries: Fiji; Kiribati; Samoa; Tonga; Tuvalu	

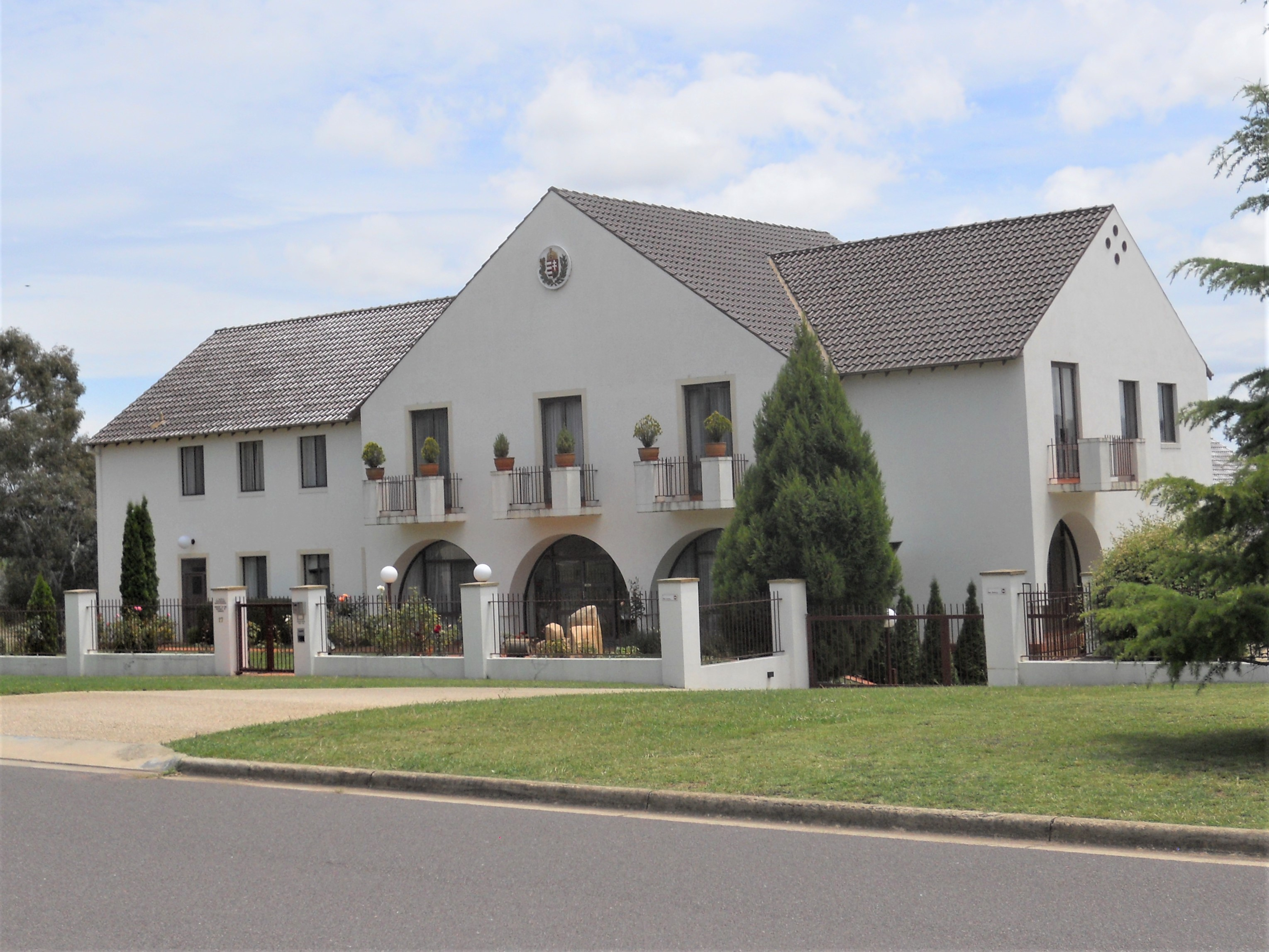
Embassy in Canberra

=== Multilateral organizations ===
Organization	Host city	Host country	Mission	Concurrent accreditation	Ref.
Council of Europe	Strasbourg	France	Permanent Mission		
European Union	Brussels	Belgium	Permanent Representation		
NATO	Brussels	Belgium	Permanent Delegation		
OECD	Paris	France	Permanent Delegation	International Organizations: UNESCO	
United Nations	New York City	United States	Permanent Mission		
United Nations	Geneva	Switzerland	Permanent Mission	International Organizations: Conference on Disarmament; World Health Organization; World Meteorological Organization; World Trade Organization	
United Nations	Vienna	Austria	Permanent Mission	International Organizations: CTBTO Preparatory Commission; OSCE; International Atomic Energy Agency; UNCITRAL; UNIDO; UNODC; United Nations Office for Outer Space Affairs , the Comprehensive Test Ban Treaty Organisation (CTBTO)	

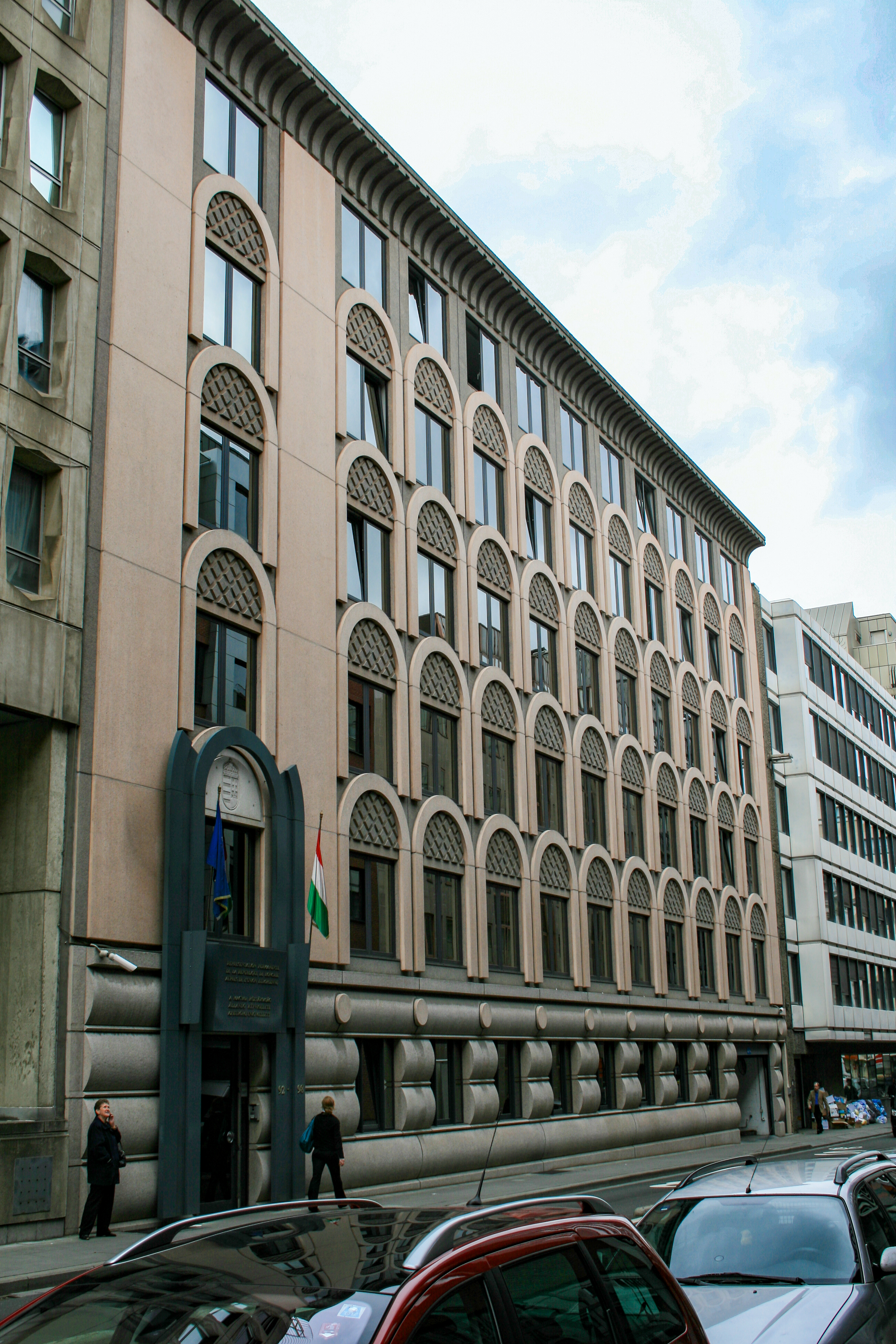
Permanent Mission to the European Union in Brussels

== Closed missions ==
=== Africa ===
Host country	Host city	Mission	Year closed	Ref.
Guinea	Conakry	Embassy (Note: Resident in Accra, Ghana)	Unknown	
Somalia	Mogadishu	Embassy (Note: Resident in Nairobi, Kenya)	Unknown	
Sudan	Khartoum	Embassy (Note: Resident in Cairo, Egypt)	Unknown	

=== Asia ===
Host country	Host city	Mission	Year closed	Ref.
Afghanistan	Kabul	Embassy	2015	
North Korea	Pyongyang	Embassy (Note: Resident in Seoul, South Korea)	1999	
South Yemen	Aden	Embassy	Unknown	
Yemen	Sana'a	Embassy (Note: Resident in Riyadh, Saudi Arabia)	Unknown	

=== Americas ===
Host country	Host city	Mission	Year closed	Ref.
Costa Rica	San José	Embassy (Note: Resident in Mexico City, Distrito Federal, Mexico)	1991	
Venezuela	Caracas	Embassy (Note: Resident in Quito, Pichincha, Ecuador)	2009	

== Future missions ==
- Turkmenistan
  - Ashgabat (Embassy)

== See also ==
- Foreign relations of Hungary
