= Kitsikis =

Kitsikis may refer to:

- Nicolas Kitsikis (1887-1978), Greek engineer and political activist
- Konstantinos "Kostas" Kitsikis (1893-1969), Greek architect
- Dimitri Kitsikis (1935-2021), Greek Turkologist
