= Beata Kitsikis =

- Μπεάτα Κιτσίκη
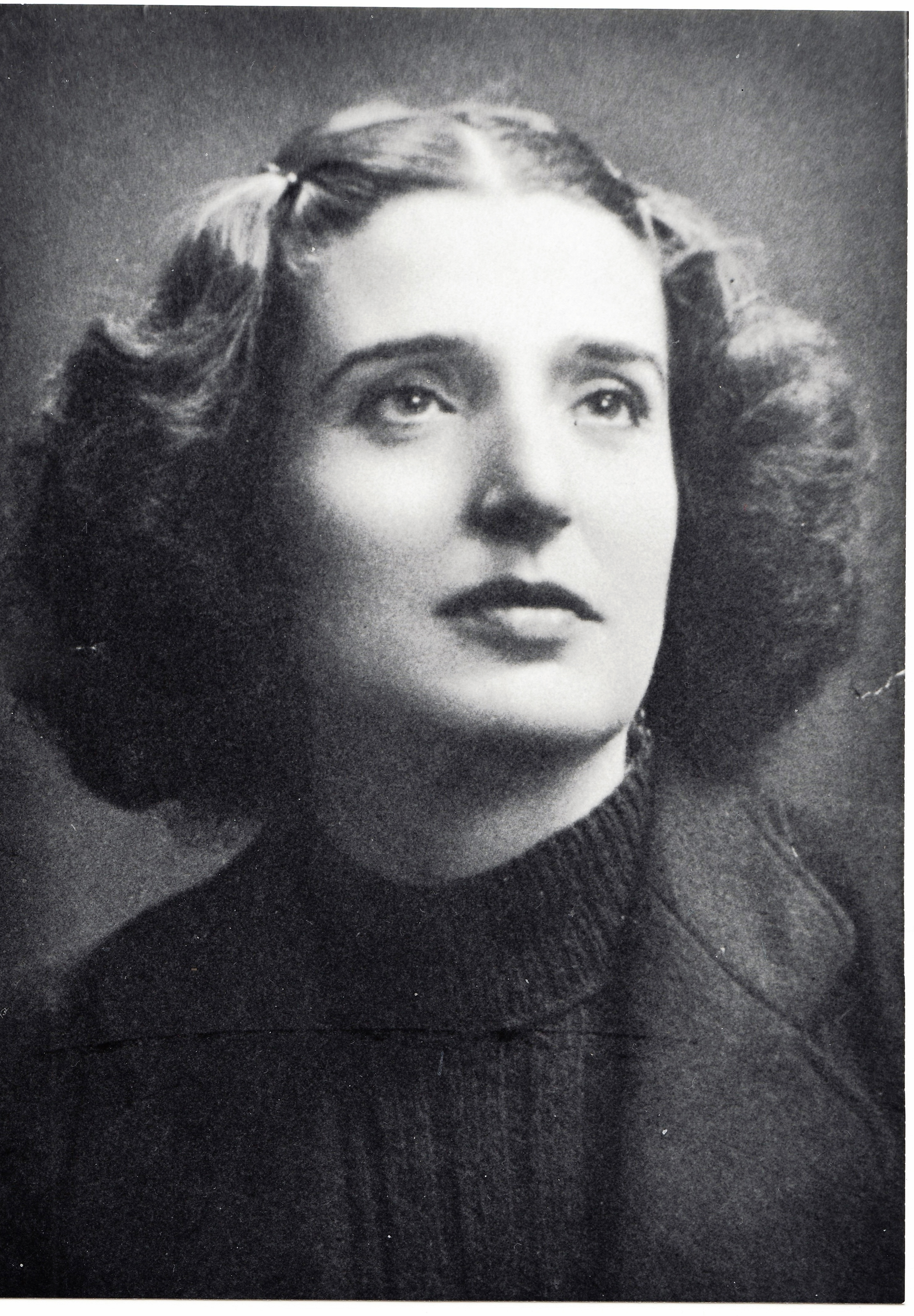
- in 1940
- Born: Merope Petychakis; July 14, 1907; Heraklion
- Died: 7 February 1986 (aged 78); Athens
- Other name: Beata Petychakis-Kitsikis
- Known for: Greek communist
- Spouse: Nicolas Kitsikis
- Children: 3, including: Dimitri Kitsikis; Beata Maria Kitsikis Panagopoulos

Beata Kitsikis (Greek: Μπεάτα Κιτσίκη; July 14, 1907, Heraklion, Cretan State – February 7, 1986, Athens), was a Greek feminist and a Communist fighter in the Greek Civil War at the end of the Second World War. She was born Merope Petychakis (Greek: Μερόπη Πετυχάκη). Her husband was Nicolas Kitsikis and her son was Dimitri Kitsikis. She also had two daughters, both University professors, Beata Maria Kitsikis Panagopoulos, an American citizen, and Elsa Schmid-Kitsikis, a Swiss citizen.

== Life ==
Her father, Emmanuel Petychakis (1842–1915) originated from a famous Cretan family from the cities of Heraklion and Rethymno. He was born in Heraklion and settled in Cairo as a businessman. He married in Egypt Corinna, daughter of a Greek-Italian count from Trieste, conte d'Antonio (David Antoniadis). Emmanuel died in Heraklion in 1915 and his widow, Corinna, 19 years younger than him, lived in Heraklion with the most famous lawyer of the city, Aristidis Stergiadis, 1861–1949, of the same age as her, who was sent to Smyrna by the Greek Prime Minister Eleftherios Venizelos as the high commissioner of the Greek Occupation of Smyrna, in 1919–1922.

In 1921, Nicolas Kitsikis,(1887–1978) the civil engineer and professor at the Polytechnic University of Athens, was building the new harbor of Heraklion and there he met with the then 14-year-old Beata whom he took back to Athens and married her in 1923. Their son Dimitri was born in 1935.

Beata never adapted to the high society of Athens in which Nicolas belonged and revolted against what she considered a useless oligarchy. During the war of Greece against the Italian invasion of Albania, in 1940–1941, she volunteered as a nurse in the military hospitals in Athens, crowded with the injured soldiers brought back from the Albanian front. During the German Occupation of Greece (1941–1944) she joined the Resistance Movement National Liberation Front (Greece) EAM (Εθνικό Απελευθερωτικό Μέτωπο) as well as the Communist Party of Greece, the KKE. By the time Athens was liberated she had joined the communist militia OPLA (Organization for the Protection of the People's Struggle).

== Beata's trial ==
On April 9, 1948, in the middle of the Civil War, a military tribunal in Athens undertook to judge accusations against Beata for espionage in favor of the outlawed Greek Communist Party, while her husband was still the President of the Greek-Soviet Association. Her courageous stand during the lawsuit impressed public opinion who started calling her the Greek Pasionaria. Her son Dimitri was sent to a boarding school in Paris, by Octave Merlier, the head of the French Institute in Athens, because his mother had been condemned to death as a communist fighter.

She was tortured but she never agreed to sign the usual declaration of repentance condemning communism. On May 1, 1948, Christos Ladas, the Minister of Justice who had signed her death penalty, was assassinated by a member of the OPLA militia and the newspapers accused Beata of having ordered the minister's murder from inside her prison. Nevertheless, because of the influence her husband Nicolas Kitsikis still enjoyed in the upper circles of Greek society her execution did not take place and she was released from prison at the end of 1951, after the civil war was over.

Her son Dimitri married his British wife Anne Hubbard, the daughter of a chief justice, in Scotland in 1955.

== Beata brings People's China to Greece ==
In 1955, Nicolas Kitsikis had talks with representatives of Beijing in Stockholm. The Chinese asked him to put up a Greek-Chinese Association in Athens at a time when only Taiwan was recognized by the Greek Government as representing China. Nicolas Kitsikis answered he would ask his wife Beata to do the job. At that time China was generally unknown to the Greek people. Beata immediately organized what was considered the greatest success of Chinese presence in the whole of Europe at the time. Since then, she travelled regularly to China where she became closely acquainted with Chinese leaders Mao Zedong, Zhou Enlai and Deng Xiaoping.

At the outburst of the Greek Colonels Coup of April 21, 1967, she flew to Switzerland with a false Swiss passport and then to Paris. After the fall of the junta in 1974, she came back to Greece. Her husband died in 1978, and she died on 7 February 1986, after a long-life struggle with tuberculosis contracted in 1940, when serving as a nurse in military hospitals. She was honored by the Communist Party of Greece.

== Sources ==
- Beata Kitsikis - Μπεάτα Κιτσίκη - Γνώρισα τους Κόκκινους Φρουρούς. Athens, Kedros, 1982. (« I have known the Red Guards »)
- Beata Kitsikis - Μπεάτα Κιτσίκη - Αποστολή 1963-1964. Απ'όσα είδαμε στην Κίνα. Athens, Fexis, 1964. (« 1963-1964. Mission to China »)
- Beata Kitsikis - Μπεάτα Κιτσίκη - Ματιές στην Κίνα. Athens, P. Bolaris Press, 1957. (« China Glimpses »)
- Γυναικείες φυλακὲς Αβέρωφ. Τραγούδι πίσω απὸ τα κάγκελα. Athens, Rizospastis, Communist Party of Greece official daily, CD, 2009 (« Averoff Women Jails. Song Behind Bars »).
- Ολυμπία Βασιλικής Γ. Παπαδούκα, Γυναικείες φυλακές Αβέρωφ, Athens, 1981 (« Averoff Women Jails »).
- Antonios Svokos, "Gynaikes kataskopoi tou KKE" [KKE Women Spies], Vradyne, 35 articles from 1 November to 14 December 1954.
- G.Marmaridis, "Pos egine he dolophonia tou Christou Lada", Akropolis, 1-V-1978 [How Christos Ladas's Assassination Took Place]

== See also ==
China-Greece relations
