= China–Hungary relations =

- China: Hungary

Diplomatic mission
- Chinese Embassy, Budapest: Hungarian Embassy, Beijing

The People's Republic of China and Hungary (at the time, the Hungarian People's Republic) established diplomatic relations in October 1949.

The PRC has an embassy in Budapest. Hungary has an embassy in Beijing and consulates-general in Chongqing, Guangzhou, Hong Kong and Shanghai. In addition, Hungary also has an unofficial diplomatic outpost for its Taiwan-related interests in the form of the Hungarian Trade Office in Taipei while Taiwan operates a representative office in Budapest.

Relations between the two countries were strongest during the tenure of Hungarian prime minister Viktor Orbán, with Hungary joining the Belt and Road Initiative in 2015 and the two declaring a comprehensive strategic partnership in 2017.

== History ==
In 1869, Austria-Hungary established diplomatic relations with the Qing dynasty.

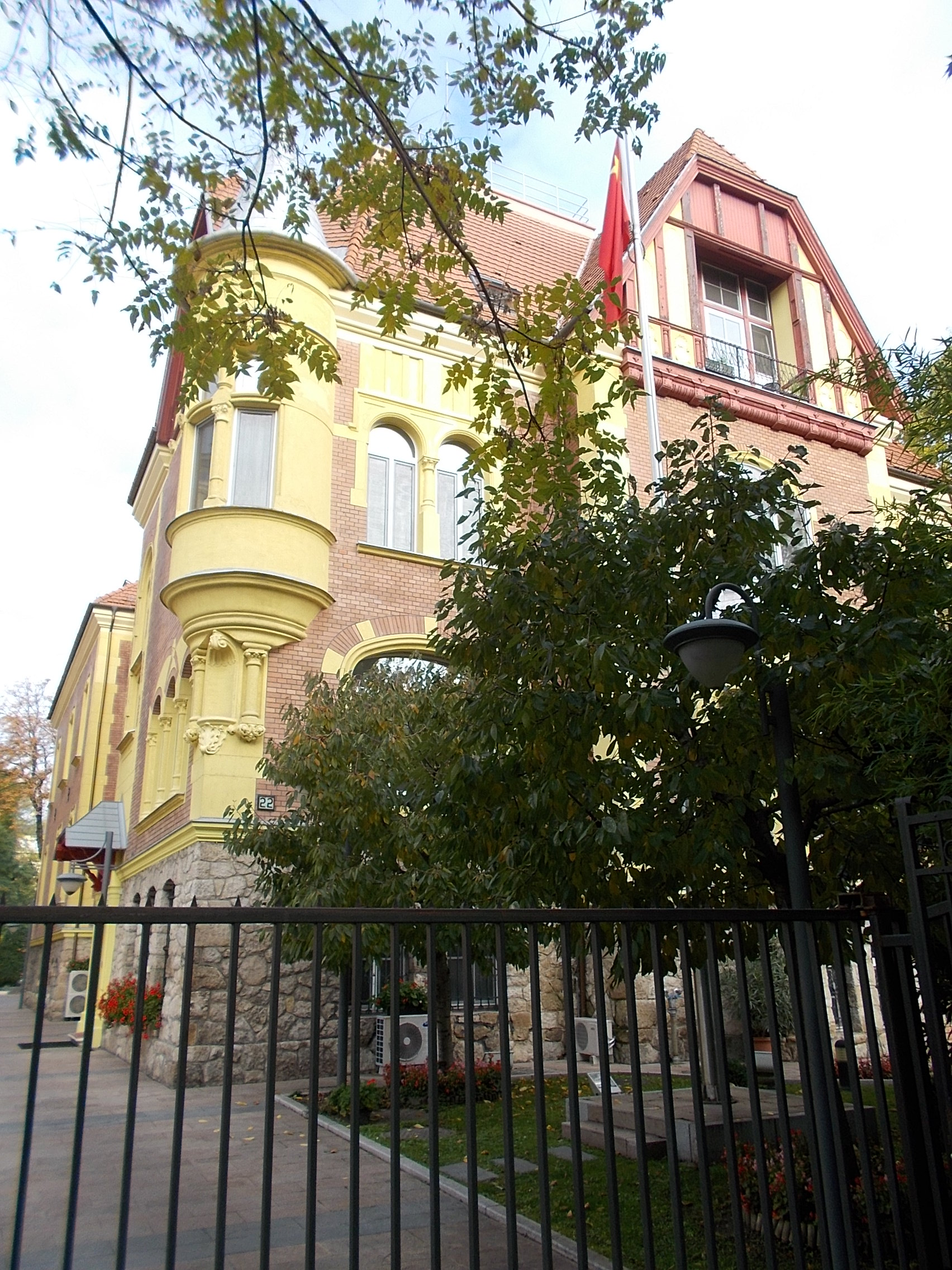
Embassy of China in Budapest

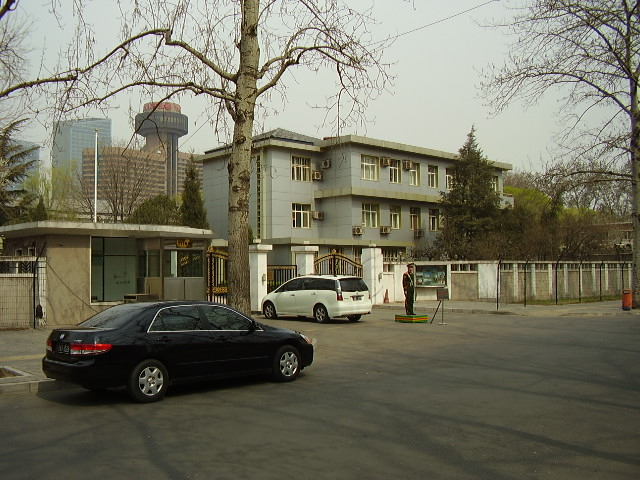
Embassy of Hungary in Beijing

=== Austro-Hungarian concession of Tianjin ===
The Austro-Hungarian concession of Tianjin (Chinese: 天津奥租界; pinyin: Tiānjīn ào zūjiè, German: österreichisch-ungarische Konzession, Hungarian: Osztrák–magyar tiencsini koncesszió) was a territory (concession) in the Chinese city of Tientsin occupied by Austria-Hungary between 1902 and 1920. It had been obtained by Austria-Hungary after the signing of the Boxer Protocol at the conclusion of the conflict between China and the Alliance of Eight Nations, which had sent an international expeditionary force to quell the Boxer Rebellion of 1901. Although the Austro-Hungarian occupation corps had been present from the previous year, the concession formally began on 27 December 1902. It is the shortest lived concession, having existed for only 14 years.

=== Cold War ===
On October 3, 1949, the Hungarian People's Republic recognized the People's Republic of China. On October 6, the two countries established diplomatic relations. During the Korean War, the Hungarian People's Republic sent medical teams to Pyongyang to treat wounded North Korean and Chinese People's Volunteer Army troops. At the height of the Hungarian Revolution of 1956, Chinese premier Zhou Enlai encouraged Soviet premier Nikita Khrushchev to intervene against the Hungarian revolutionaries. Starting in 1956, shortly before the Hungarian Revolution, Hungary sent a team of experts to China to prospect for oil in Daqing, which would become China's largest oil field.

In 1989, Hungarian government, which was undergoing political reform, reacted strongly to the 1989 Tiananmen Square protests and massacre, condemning the Chinese government's actions. Demonstrations were held outside the Chinese embassy. Hungary was the only country in Europe to have substantially reduced relations with China in the aftermath of the events.

=== 21st century ===
During the government of Viktor Orbán, Hungary strengthened its ties with China while other European Union member states considered "de-risking" their relations with China. Hungary joined the Belt and Road Initiative in 2015. In 2016, Hungary (along with Greece) attempted to block direct references to China in an EU statement on the South China Sea arbitration ruling. In 2017, China and Hungary declared their relationship a comprehensive strategic partnership. Hungary also blocked the European Union from formally criticizing China's actions in Hong Kong in both 2020 and 2021.

In 2021, it was revealed that Fudan University was planning a campus in Budapest. This led to pushback in the country and to protests, leading the Hungarian government to delay the plans and promise that it will hold a referendum on the issue. On 22 May 2022, the Constitutional Court ruled the referendum as unconstitutional as it concerns an international agreement. Hungarian officials also promised to resume the project after the victory of the ruling Fidesz during the 2022 parliamentary elections.

On 20 February 2023, Chinese Communist Party (CCP) Politburo member and top diplomat Wang Yi visited Budapest to meet with prime minister Orbán. During the meeting, Hungarian foreign minister Péter Szijjártó stated that "[w]hen we have faced crises in recent years, Hungary has always come out of them stronger than it went into them, but Hungarian-Chinese cooperation has played an absolutely indispensable role in this". On 27 February 2023, Orbán backed the peace plan released by Wang Yi about ending the Russian invasion of Ukraine.

CCP general secretary Xi Jinping visited Hungary in May 2024 and met with Orbán. During the visit, the two countries entered into an "all-weather comprehensive strategic partnership for a new era" as well as 18 other agreements and memoranda of understanding.

In October 2025, it was reported that Chinese state-backed advanced persistent threat group Mustang Panda had targeted Hungarian and other European diplomats as part of a coordinated cyber-espionage campaign.

== Economic relations ==
In 2015, Hungary was the largest recipient of Chinese outbound direct investment with around $571 million. As of at least 2024, Hungary is one of the strongest European supporters of the BRI. Between 2022 and 2024, Hungary received nearly a quarter of Chinese foreign direct investment to Europe. Hungarian foreign minister Szijjártó stated in 2023 that Hungarian-Chinese trade was over $10 billion.

Hungary hosts the largest supply center of Huawei outside of China. Since at least 2017, Hungarian police and other governmental institutions have used Chinese surveillance equipment from Dahua Technology and Hikvision.

In 2022, Chinese battery company CATL agreed to invest $7.5 billion to build a factory in Debrecen. Concerns were raised among locals about environmental and health effects of the factory. Hungary also has several Chinese electric vehicle battery plants. In 2023, Chinese electric vehicle company BYD Auto chose Szeged as its first large factory in Europe. In March 2025, the European Commission opened a probe into whether the BYD Auto plant had received unfair state subsidies from China. In July 2026, Hungarian prime minister Péter Magyar announced that it would investigate the deal with BYD Auto after the former foreign minister Péter Szijjártó accepted a job with BYD shortly after resigning. Magyar's government increased regulatory oversight, particularly environmental, of Chinese companies operating in Hungary.

== Healthcare ==
Hungary was the first EU member to approve the use of the COVID-19 vaccine developed by China's Sinopharm.

== Taiwan ==
Hungary follows the one China principle. It recognizes the People's Republic of China as the sole government of China and Taiwan as an integral part of China's territory. In 1990, Hungary and Taiwan established representative offices in Tapei and Budapest, respectively.

== Public opinion ==
A survey published in 2026 by the Pew Research Center found that 53% of Hungarians had a favorable view of China, while 40% had an unfavorable view.

== Resident diplomatic missions ==
- China has an embassy in Budapest.
- Hungary has an embassy in Beijing and consulates-general in Chongqing, Guangzhou, Hong Kong and Shanghai.

== See also ==
- Foreign relations of China
- Foreign relations of Hungary
