= Beata Maria Kitsikis Panagopoulos =

Greek-born American historian (1925–2023)

- Μπεάτα Μαρία Κιτσίκη-Παναγοπούλου
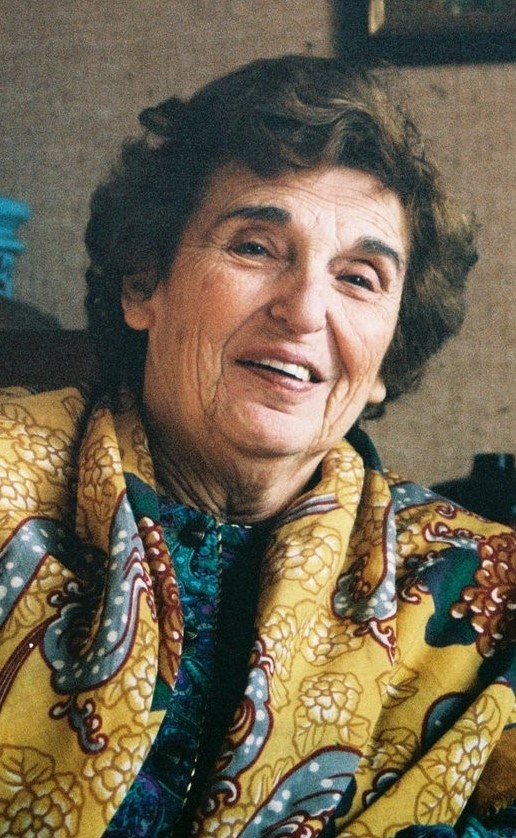
- Born: June 27, 1925; Athens
- Died: April 27, 2023 (aged 97); Paris
- Education: Oriental Institute, University of Chicago, bachelor's, master's; University of California, Berkeley, Ph.D.
- Employers: Wayne State University; Encyclopedia Americana; Foothill College; San Jose State University
- Parents: Nicolas Kitsikis; Beata Kitsikis

Beata Maria Kitsikis Panagopoulos (Greek: Μπεάτα Μαρία Κιτσίκη-Παναγοπούλου; June 27, 1925 – April 27, 2023) was a Greek-born American professor of art at San Jose State University. In 1982, she received the Academy of Athens annual award for the humanities. In 1992, she received the Hellenic American Professional Society of California's Axion Award.

== Early life and education ==
Beata Maria Kitsikis was born in Athens, Greece on June 27, 1925, as the daughter and eldest child of three to Nicolas Kitsikis and Beata Merope Petychakis. Nicolas Kitsikis was full professor and rector of the National Technical University of Athens (Athens Polytechnic School) and had served as General Director of Public Works in the government of Eleftherios Venizelos, 1917–1920. At the time of her birth, he was a technical director for the British company MacAlpine and had, among other projects, built the harbour of Heraklion, Crete. Her mother, Beata Petychakis (Beata Kitsikis) born July 14, 1907, in Heraklion, Crete, was the daughter of Emanuel Petychakis, a Cretan Greek doing business in Egypt. Beata Petychakis married Nicolas Kitsikis at 16 and moved to Athens where Panagopoulos was born. Panagopoulos grew up in central Athens, in the suburb of Ekali, and eventually, in the neighborhood called Kolonaki.

Panagopoulos finished high school in 1943. During the next two years she studied architecture at the National Technical University of Athens, and archeology at the School of Philosophy, University of Athens (UoA). In February 1947, Panagopoulos left Greece for the United States, where she had received a scholarship to the Oriental Institute of the University of Chicago. There she completed both her bachelor's degree and master's degree in the field of Medieval Art History under Professor Ulrich Middeldorf.

== Marriage and children ==
At the University of Chicago, she met a doctoral student, Epaminondas Petros (Nondas) Panagopoulos. They subsequently married and had two children. The family moved first to Detroit, Michigan where Nondas began teaching at Wayne State University. In 1956, the family moved to San Jose, California, where Nondas taught American History at San Jose State University (SJSU). She and Nondas co-authored the sections on "Modern Culture" in the chapter on "Greece" in the 1958 edition of the Encyclopedia Americana.

== Career ==
=== Early career as an educator and PhD ===
Panagopoulos earned teaching certificates in Art and French and began teaching at Fremont High School, Sunnyvale. In 1961, she began teaching Art History at Foothill College. In 1962, she was accepted at Stanford University in the Art History PhD program, then transferred to the University of California, Berkeley's Art History Department in 1964. Completing her dissertation at the Sorbonne in Paris, she received her PhD in 1970. From then on, she taught at SJSU until 1988.^{[1]}

During this time she was appointed Kress Professor of the American School of Classical Studies at Athens, Greece and concurrently served three years as director of the Gennadius Library.

=== Humanities education ===
Two major experiences in the 1970s contributed to the development of Panagopoulos' teaching philosophy which emphasized the importance of a humanities education. First, at SJSU, she became a professor in the innovative educational four-year program called New College, an intensive study program based on small seminars, exploring important themes of modern life.

The second occurred during Panagopoulos' tour of China in 1975. Educators were led by the Chinese government as part of Mao Zedong's first efforts to show China to the world. Panagopoulos wrote of the experience in an article in the UCLA Educator 1976, entitled: "On Creativity in the People's Republic of China, An Art Historian's Perspective." Content was also included in her course on Women and Art at New College.

=== Frankish monastic architecture in Greece ===
Panagopoulos' book Cistercian and Mendicant Monasteries in Medieval Greece was published in 1979 and examined the development of Latin ecclesiastical architecture in Greece:

This is the only comprehensive study of the most outstanding extant Gothic monasteries built during the French and Italian occupancy of Greece after the conquest of Constantinople in 1204 CE.
-- Walter Horn, University of California, Berkeley

=== Kress Professor and director of the Gennadius Library ===
In 1982, Panagopoulos was appointed Kress Professor at the American School of Classical Studies in Athens (ASCSA) and from July 1983 to July 1986, was director of its Gennadius Library.

Under Panagopoulos' leadership monthly lectures, chamber music concerts and exhibits grew in popularity. The library had an exhibit on the literary activities in Thessaloniki, another on the treasures of Mt. Sinai and the Patriarchate of Alexandria and a third on the achievements of the American School of Classical Studies in Athens. In 1985 Athens was selected as the European Capital of Culture and the Gennadius Library fully participated in events throughout the year. The library was part of five exhibitions and in addition contributed substantially to a television program on the life of Joannes Gennadius.

=== Turco-Baroque domestic architecture ===
During the late 1970s and early 1980s, Panagopoulos did her own research and synthesized fragmented studies surrounding certain large mansions (Greek: αρχοντικά) built in Greece and the remaining Balkans between 1700 and 1900. Her work recognized as an emerging class the owners of these mansions who were merchants dealing in products—leather, wax, fabrics—from the Ottoman Empire for sale in lucrative European markets like Madrid, Vienna and Venice. Slowly they became rich and built homes using itinerant builders mostly from Greece's Epirus and western Macedonia regions.

== Personal life and death ==
Panagopoulos retired in 1988 from SJSU, and spent the remaining years living in San Francisco and traveling frequently.

Panagopoulos died in Paris, France on April 27, 2023, at the age of 97.

== Awards ==
In 1982 Panagopoulos received, in Greece, the Academy of Athens annual award for the humanities. In addition, in the United States, in 1992, she received the Hellenic American Professional Society of California's Axion Award.

== Publications ==
- Panagopoulos, Beata Kitsikis (1979). Cistercian and Mendicant Monasteries in Medieval Greece. University of Chicago Press, ISBN 0-226-64544-4, World Cat.org 4495918.
- Panagopoulos, Beata Kitsikis, "Death at the Firing Squad" Women in the Resistance and the Holocaust, The Voices of Witnesses. ed. Vera Laska. Contributions in Women's Studies No.37, Greenwood Press, Westport Connecticut. 1983.
- Panagopoulos, E.P. and Beata Maria Panagopoulos(1958). "Greece: Modern Culture (section 8)". Encyclopedia Americana, New York: Americana Corporation, Volume 13 Goethe-HAW, pp 418e.
- Panagopoulos, Beata Kitsikis (Spring 1976). "On Creativity In The People's Republic of China". UCLA Educator, Graduate School of Education, Volume 18, No. 2, pp. 29–35.
- Panagopoulos, Beata Kitsikis. "American Women Artists". Zygos, Issue 22–23, September–December, 1976, pp 105–108 (Greek:________ Οι γυναικες ζογραφοι στην '΄Αμερικι, ΖΥΓΟΣ, 22-23, Σεπτεμβριος-Δεκεμβριος, 1976 105-108)
- Panagopoulos, Beata Kitsikis. "The Ceramics of Simone Kostopoulou". Zygos, Issue 62, November–December,1983, pp. 63–65 (Greek:__________Κεραμικα της Σιμον Κωστοπουλου, ΖΥΓΟΣ, Νοεμβριος-Δεκεμβριος, 1983 63–65.)
- Panagopoulos, Beata Maria, "The Aghia Sophia Church In Oakland". Αρχιτεκτονικη. A periodical of Architecture and Art published in Greece (10 Panepistimiou Street, Athens, Greece) in Greek, English and German Languages. Vol 7. No. 41. Oct. 1963. Pp xviii-xxi
- Panagopoulos, Beata, Kitsikis, "Some Venetian Churches in Crete". Estratto Arte Veneta, Annata XXX, 1976
- Panagopoulos, Beata Kitsikis, "Medieval Architecture In Greece: Western Monastic Orders in the Latin States Formed On Byzantine Territory", originally Actes Du XVe Congres International D'Etudes Byzantines Athenes -1976 II Art et Archeologie published 1981
- Panagopoulos, Beata Maria, "Western Monasteries in the Peloponnese, Cistercian, Franciscan, and Dominican in the 13th and 14th Centuries". National Research Foundation, Institute of Byzantine Research, International Conference 14 Monastic Movements in the Peloponnese 4th-15th century A.D. (Greek:Δυτικος Μοναχισμος Στην Πελοποννησο, Κιστερκιανοι, Φραγκισκανοι, Δομινικανοι, Τον 13ο και 14ο Αιονα, Εθνικο Ιδρυμα Ερευνον Ινστιτουτο Βυζαντινον Ερευνον Διεθνη Συμποσια 14, Επιστημονικν επιμελια,) Athens 2004 unpublished
