= Eastern Party =

Eastern Party is a concept that has long been used by mainstream historians to define the reaction of a section of the population in the Third World countries against Westernization and the import of Western values in their societies. Rather than a specific political party, the term refers to a current in the public opinion of the said countries opposed to a "Western Party" of modernizers, who tend to accept Westernization as an inevitable phenomenon, which finally benefits the overall progress of Third World societies. Particularly in the history of Greece and Byzantium, this concept has been largely used by noted historians like Arnold J. Toynbee, Leften Stavrianos, Alexander Vasiliev and Nicolae Iorga, at the beginning of the 20th century and later by Dimitri Kitsikis.

== Greece as Third World country ==
American historian Stavrianos was a follower of British historian Toynbee and wrote in 1972 that "the first teaching given to us by History is that Greece is an underdeveloped country and therefore is part of the Third World". Toynbee, who, in 1922, had published a famous book on the Greco-Turkish War (1919–1922), he also had placed Greece in the Third World. Furthermore, he considered Greece a victim of the West and condemned Western civilization as a failed civilization.

== Modern history ==
From the first conquest of Constantinople by the Crusaders in 1204 to the second conquest by the Ottoman Empire in 1453, the Byzantine Empire raged the struggle between the two parties, the pro-Latin Western Party and the pro-Turkish Eastern Party. Final victory came to the latter.

By Hellenoturkism, in the 19th century, the opposition of the Eastern Party to the newly-born Greek nation state of 1821 continued. At the eve of the Balkan Wars of 1912-1913, three friends (writer Pericles Giannopoulos, diplomat Ion Dragoumis and officer Athanase Souliotis-Nikolaidis) struggled in their writings and political action to defeat the so-called "Frankish fanatics".

== Today ==
Historian Dimitri Kitsikis, as a follower of Dragoumis, has relentlessly supported in all his writings, after the Second World War, the ideology of the Eastern Party, along with a growing number of Greek scholars who followed in his path as John S. Romanides, George Metallinos, Kostas Sardelis, and Christos Yannaras.

== Reaction of Western Party ==
The Eastern Party was understood from the civilizational point of view rather than that of a political party (in Greek παράταξη rather than κόμμα) and found itself in opposition to the Western Party, the Greek pro-Westerners, at least since the 15th century Italian Renaissance. Then, scores of Byzantine intellectuals fled to the West, to escape from the conquest of Constantinople by the Ottomans. Plethon and Bessarion were some of the famous philosophers and theologians who fled to Italy at that time.

The gist of the intellectual differences between the two parties was explained by the minister of Foreign Affairs of Eleftherios Venizelos in 1919, Alexandros Diomidis (who signed Diomède in French) in the following words: "Monasticism, especially Mount Athos, a bastion of radical Orthodoxy... was overwhelmingly directing what we call today public opinion.... This uncompromising Byzantine mentality as represented by the leaders of the reactionary party, [Joseph] Bryennios [1350-1431], Markos Evgenikos and Gennadios, with their Easternized psychosynthesis and their phanatical antipathy to any Greek classical education, was nearer to the mentality of the Eastern Turks than to the spirit of classical Antiquity which flourished in the West. The Byzantine and Muslim worlds with time and with their continuous promiscuity had adopted common characteristics.... Both were anti-progressive and fatalists".

When, in the Summer 1993 issue of Foreign Affairs, Samuel P. Huntington published his work The Clash of Civilizations and the Remaking of World Order in which he disputed the idea that Greece belonged to the Western civilization, Westernizing professors of the Greek Universities Thanos Veremis and Theodore Couloumbis expressed their opposition to such a stand, which aimed at excluding Greece from Western civilization and accused their American colleague "of discovering new barbarians". The dispute between the Western and the Eastern Parties took paramount proportions after the Greek economic crisis started in 2009 and in the summer of 2015, with the decision of the leftist Tsipras government to organize a referendum on the relations of the country with the European Union, Greece was once more split between West and East.

== Bibliography ==
- China's Response to the West. A Documentary Survey, 1839-1923, edited by Ssu-Yu Teng and John K. Fairbank, New York, Atheneum, Harvard University Press, 1975.
- Ion Dragoumis, Ὅσοι ζωντανοί (Those Who Are Still Alive), Athens, 1927.
- Nicolas Iorga, Byzance après Byzance, 1971.
- Dimitri Kitsikis, Συγκριτικὴ Ἱστορίας Ἑλλάδος-Κίνας, ἀπὸ τὴν ἀρχαιότητα μέχρι σήμερα (A Comparative History of Greece and China), Athens, Herodotos, 2007.
- Dimitri Kitsikis, Συγκριτικὴ Ἱστορία Ἑλλάδος καὶ Τουρκίας στὸν 20ο αἰῶνα (A Comparative History of Greece and Turkey), Athens, Hestia, 1978.
- Dimitri Kitsikis, Ἱστορία τοῦ ἑλληνοτουρκικοῦ χώρου, 1928-1973 (A History of the Greek-Turkish Area, 1928-1973), Athens, Hestia, 1981.
- Arnold J. Toynbee, A Study of History, London, Oxford University Press, 12 volumes, 1934-1961.
- L. S. Stavrianos, The World to 1500. A Global History & The World since 1500. A Global History, Prentice Hall, New Jersey, 1966, 2 volumes.
- L. S. Stavrianos, The Third World Comes of Age, New York, Norton, 1982.
- A. A. Vasiliev, History of the Byzantine Empire, 324-1453, Madison, University of Wisconsin Press, 1952.
- C. M. Woodhouse, Capodistria: the founder of Greek independence, New York, 1973.
- Christos Yannaras, Orthodoxy and the West, Brookline, MA, Holy Cross Orthodox Press, 2006.
