= Laocracy =

Laocracy (Greek: λαοκρατία) is a political term meaning "rule of the people". It has been used by the Greek labor movement since its inception, instead of the term democracy.

For Greek communists the Greek word democracy (δημοκρατία), meaning the rule of the demos, refers to the ancient rule of the ruling social class of free citizens, forming the demos, in the Athenian Republic of the city-state which represented a minority while the slaves were the majority of the population. In this sense, democracy is considered by the Greek communists to refer to the rule of the minority, through representative parliamentary democracy, while laocracy would be direct democracy, exercised by the people themselves.

Greek historian Dimitri Kitsikis has systematically used the term laocracy in all his writings. Russian political philosopher Alexandr Dugin has used the term laocracy saying that "the state should become an instrument of the People. This system should be called as such laocracy".
