= China–Greece relations =

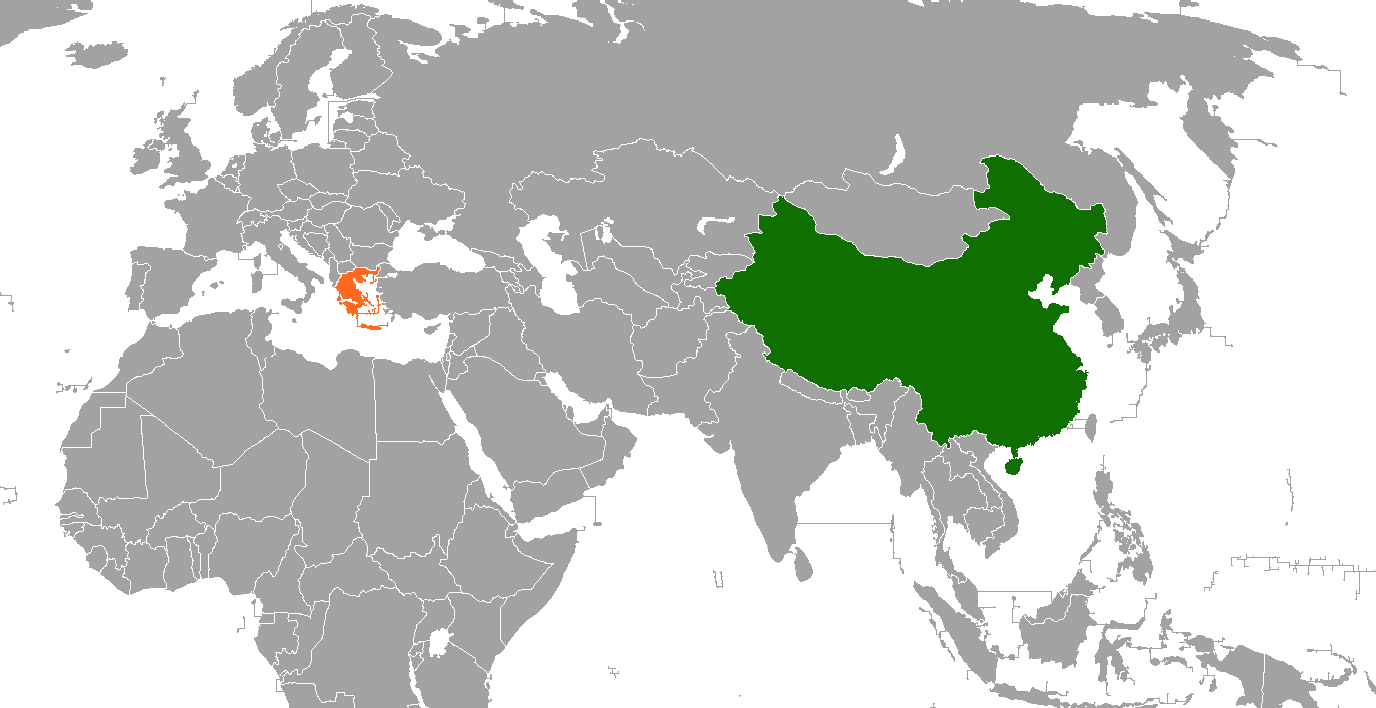
- China: Greece

The People's Republic of China (PRC) and Greece established official diplomatic relations in 1972. The PRC has an embassy in Athens. Greece has an embassy in Beijing and three general consulates in Guangzhou, Hong-Kong and since 2005 in Shanghai. The two countries formed a strategic partnership in 2006.

In the early years of the Cold War, Greece, like most other Western European countries, recognized the Chinese Nationalist Government of Chiang Kai-shek as being the legitimate governing authority of China, despite Chiang only controlling a rump state on Taiwan. Greek forces fought against Chinese forces during the Korean War.

In June 1972, in the aftermath of Richard Nixon's visit to Beijing and the People's Republic of China's admission to the United Nations, Greece switched recognition to the People's Republic, cutting off relations with Taiwan. Today, Taiwan maintains a "Taipei Representative Office in Athens", which is active in organizing various events and making statements to the Greek media; however, Greece adheres to a One China policy, and Taiwanese officials in Athens do not enjoy diplomatic or consular status.

In the 1980s, bilateral relations were strengthened when Greek Prime Minister Andreas Papandreou sought allies beyond Europe and the US in his policy of confronting Turkey over the Cyprus and Aegean disputes, and courted China under Deng Xiaoping. Greek shipowners also played an important role, by ordering many of their ships to be built in Chinese shipyards beginning in the 1980s, instead of British, German and Japanese shipyards (as had been the case since the late 19th century).

The Port of Piraeus (under Chinese management since 2009 and majority Chinese ownership since 2016) is important from a geostrategic view for China, as it helps China's transactions with the whole of Europe.

== History of bilateral relations ==
=== Ancient ===
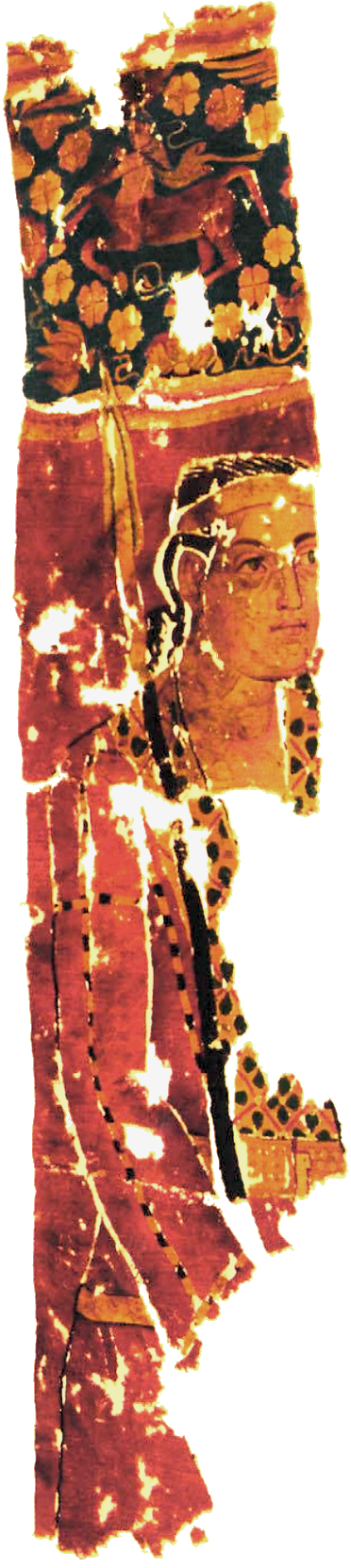
Part of the Sampul tapestry with Hellenistic features. Now in the Xinjiang Museum

Ancient Chinese people had contact with the Indo-Greeks. Dayuan (meaning "Great Ionians"), was described in the Chinese historical works of Records of the Grand Historian and the Book of Han. It is mentioned in the accounts of the famous Chinese explorer Zhang Qian in 130 BCE and the numerous embassies that followed him into Central Asia. The country of Dayuan is generally accepted as relating to the Ferghana Valley, and its Greek city Alexandria Eschate. These Chinese accounts describe the Dayuan as urbanized dwellers with Caucasian features, living in walled cities and having "customs identical to those of the Greco-Bactrians". Strabo writes that Bactrian Greeks "extended their empire even as far as the Seres (Chinese) and the Phryni". The War of the Heavenly Horses (104–101 BC) was a war between Dayuan and the Han dynasty. The Sampul tapestry found at the Tarim Basin settlement of Sampul in Lop County, Hotan Prefecture, Xinjiang, has many Hellenistic features.

Following the ancient Roman embassies to China recorded in ancient Chinese histories, there appear to have been contacts between the Byzantine Empire and several dynasties of China, beginning with the Tang dynasty (618–907 AD). Theophylact Simocatta wrote a generally accurate depiction of the reunification of China by Emperor Wen (r. 581–604 AD) of the Sui dynasty, with the conquest of the rival Chen dynasty in southern China, correctly placing these events within the reign period of Byzantine ruler Maurice. From Chinese records it is known that Michael VII Doukas (Mie li yi ling kai sa 滅力伊靈改撒) of Fu lin (拂菻; i.e. Byzantium) dispatched a diplomatic mission to China that eventually arrived in 1081, during the reign of Emperor Shenzong of the Song dynasty (960–1279 AD), centuries before Marco Polo's expedition. Kublai Khan, the Mongol-ruler who founded the Yuan dynasty (1271–1368 AD) of China not only maintained correspondence with the Byzantine Greeks but hosted some of them at his court in Khanbaliq (modern Beijing). The History of Yuan (chapter 134) records that a certain Ai-sie (transliteration of either Joshua or Joseph) from the country of Fu lin (i.e. the Byzantine Empire), initially in the service of Güyük Khan, was well-versed in Western languages and had expertise in the fields of Greek medicine and astronomy that convinced Kublai Khan to offer him a position as the director of medical and astronomical boards. Kublai Khan eventually honored Ai-sie with the noble title of Prince of Fu lin (Chinese: 拂菻王; Fú lǐn wáng). In his biography within the History of Yuan his children are mentioned by their Chinese names, which bear similarities to the Christian names Elias (Ye-li-ah), Luke (Lu-ko), and Antony (An-tun), with a daughter named A-na-si-sz.

Τhe Sino-Hellenic contacts since Hellenistic times has recently been reinforced by the interdisciplinary study of prestige gold provided which a new interpretive framework for understanding trans-cultural contact between Han China and the Hellenistic world. The contextual analysis of the gold artefacts with foreign features presented in the current paper shows that the quest for exotica along with the desire for “heavenly horses” among the ruling elites acted as the driving force that led to an unprecedented extent of imperial expansion of the Han court in Central Asia, as well as the establishment of a vast trading network during the first century BCE. Today these ancient relations are unfolded and strengthened with the Sino-Hellenic Academic Project.

=== Modern ===
==== Korean War ====
During the Korean War the two countries were enemies and their forces fought each other, notably at the Battle of Chosin Reservoir. The Greek Expeditionary Force was part of the United Nations Command, which fought against the PRC's People's Volunteer Army and North Korean forces.

==== Greek shipowners during the Cold War ====
Although China and Greece were enemies in the early years of the Cold War, with their militaries directly confronting each other in the Korean War, many Greek shipowners greatly helped the Chinese Communist regime of Mao Zedong during these same years by breaking the trade embargo imposed on China by most Western countries (Greece among them) and secretly carrying cargoes to Chinese ports. During the Korean War, freight rates rocketed as demand for supplies reached enormous heights. Greek shipowners made their tonnage available to Mao's government, in a win-win situation, as Mao successfully broke the embargo and secured vital supplies while the shipowners enjoyed excellent profits.

The most prominent example was that of Aristotle Onassis, who used American-made ships (the T2 Tankers) of his private fleet (then the largest privately owned fleet in the world) flying the Honduran, Panamanian and Liberian flags to transport cargoes to Chinese ports. In a similar operation coordinated with the Chinese Communist intelligence services, Onassis used his tankers to transport petroleum to China, in ships flying the Saudi flag.

==== Andreas Papandreou and Deng Xiaoping ====
Andreas Papandreou, who came to power in 1981, aggressively courted China as part of his policy of finding allies beyond Greece's traditional partners in Western Europe and the US to confront Turkey over the Cyprus and Aegean disputes. His April 1986 visit to Beijing, followed by the visit to Athens of Chinese Premier Zhao Ziyang (the first such visit by a Chinese head of government), were important milestones in developing bilateral relations. Although Papandreou was able to earn diplomatic support from Chinese paramount leader Deng Xiaoping on some of his initiatives, the more long-lasting impact of this visit was felt in the economic and commercial fields, especially in shipping.

==== European Union era ====
China and Greece raised their bilateral relations to a strategic partnership in 2006.

Since 2010, China has strengthened its relationship with Greece, following the increased strain in the European Union-Greece relationship after Greece's bailout.

In 2014, 78 Chinese citizens were among those evacuated from Libya by the Greek navy frigate Salamis. China thanked Greece for its help.

In 2016, Greece (along with Hungary) attempted to block direct references to China in an EU statement on the South China Sea arbitration ruling.In 2017, Greek Prime Minister Alexis Tsipras prevented the European Union from issuing statements condemning Chinese aggression in the South China Sea and its human rights record, moves widely attributed as a response to Chinese investment in the Port of Piraeus. This was the first time the EU had failed to make a joint statement at the UN Human Rights Council.

In August 2018, Greece joined the Belt and Road Initiative.

On the 12th of April, 2019, Greece officially joined China's 'Cooperation between China and Central and Eastern European Countries', becoming the 17th European Nation to join the initiative, making it 17+1. This move has further developed relations between China and Greece.

In 2019, the Bank of China opened its first branch in Greece.

On July 8, 2021, the Greek PM Kyriakos Mitsotakis expressed Greece's appreciation of China's firm stance regarding a settlement of the Cyprus dispute.

===== Espionage =====
In July 2025, Greek authorities arrested four Chinese nationals at Tanagra Air Base for taking photos of military facilities. In February 2026, the Hellenic National Defence General Staff announced that Greek authorities had arrested a member of the Hellenic Air Force for allegedly leaking "highly sensitive" information to China. The air force officer previously participated in MIM-104 Patriot modernization efforts.

== Chinese investments in Greece ==
In October 2009, COSCO leased for 30 years part of the Port of Piraeus, the cargo level two years later was three times higher than before. COSCO has a 67% ownership stake in the Port of Piraeus.

In 2010 a $123 million contract between Helios Plaza and BCEGI, a subsidiary of Beijing Construction Engineering Group, real estate company and construction contractor. Helios is developing a hotel and commercial complex for tourism in Piraeus, Athens' largest port town. Huawei Technologies, a Chinese telecom invested with Hellenic Telecommunications Organization.

In March 2015 Deputy Greek Prime Minister Yannis Dragasakis and Minister of Foreign Affairs Nikos Kotzias paid an official visit to China on 25 March 2015. Within this context, Minister Kotzias met with the Foreign Minister of China, Wang Yi.

== Cultural connections ==
In 1978, China and Greece signed the “China-Greece Cultural Exchange and Cooperation Agreement”, followed by the “China-Greece Science and Technology Exchange and Cooperation Agreement” in 1979, and the “China-Greece Tourism Cooperation Agreement” in 1988.

Since China and Greece have signed an agreement on scientific and technological exchanges and cooperation in 1979, they both have successively convened 10 scientific and technological cooperation mixed committees. The cooperation projects involved agriculture, energy, geosciences, oceanography, biology, medicine. In the fields of sociology, materials science and basic research, some cooperative projects have achieved research results and economic and social benefits. The two countries also have exchanges in protection of cultural relics, museum construction, and press groups.

In 2005, the "Memorandum of Understanding on China-Greece Education Cooperation" was signed.

In 2012, on the 40th anniversary of the establishment of diplomatic relations between the People's Republic of China and Greece many commemoratory events were planned in both countries, such as a joint philatelic publication, circulated by the Greek and Chinese postal services. A variety of events were also organized including a Greek cinema week and an exhibition on the lives and works of Socrates and Lao Tzu.

On 7 July 2021, Greek PM Kyriakos Mitsotakis and Chinese leader Xi Jinping agreed for the "Greece-China Year of Culture & Tourism" to begin in September 2021 and extend to 2022 since it is a good opportunity to further strengthen relations and increase tourist flows between the two countries. On 17 September 2021, statues of Confucius and Socrates were unveiled in Athens to mark the beginning of “Greece-China Year of Culture & Tourism”. Additionally, on 29 September 2021, the Greek Ministry of Culture and Sports and its Chinese counterpart, the National Cultural Heritage Administration, launched an online exhibition (hosted by the National Archaeological Museum in Athens and the Emperor Qinshihuang's Mausoleum Site Museum in Xi’an) presenting the Chinese Terracotta Army and the Greek kouros. The exhibition is the first of its kind in Greece. On 27 October 2021, the Chinese Foreign Minister Wang Yi held meetings in Athens with leading Greek officials on Wednesday about deepening the two countries’ economic ties. He specifically met with the Greek Foreign MinisterNikos Dendias and with the Greek Prime Minister Kyriakos Mitsotakis. Wang, in his visit to Athens, noted that: "China and Greece are not only partners that benefit each other for win-win outcomes but also in particular, friends that share the same aspirations. China-Greece cooperation has been always in the front rank of China-Europe relations, setting an example for exchanges between and mutual learning from countries of different cultural backgrounds and social systems."

== Bilateral visits ==
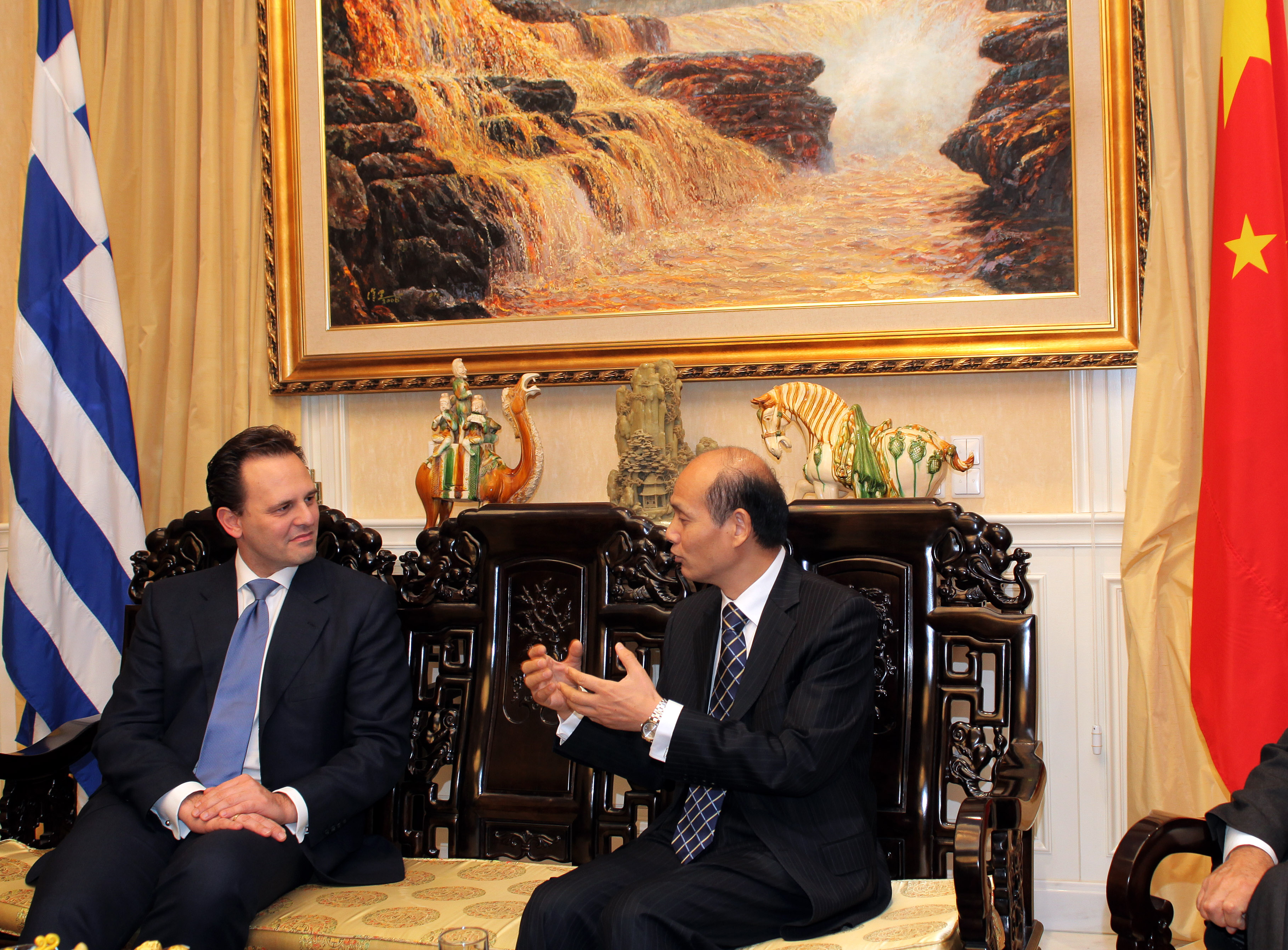
Foreign Minister Dimitris Droutsas during the attendance of a dinner hosted by the Chinese Ambassador to Greece Linquan Luo at his residence in January 2011

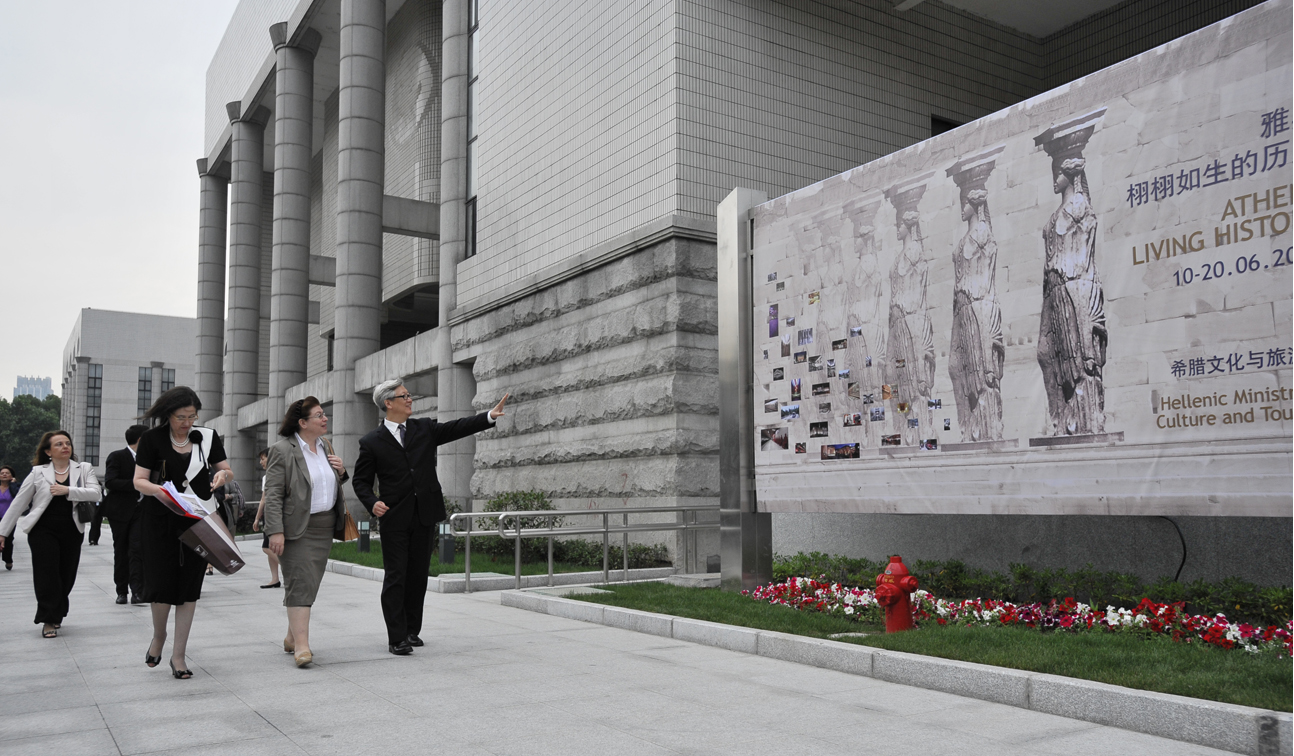
An exposition with Greek thematic in Shanghai

- June 2002 Prime Minister of Greece Costas Simitis visited China
- January 2006, The Prime Minister of Greece Kostas Karamanlis paid a state visit to China
- June 2008, the President of Greece Karolos Papoulias paid a five-day state visit to China
- November 2008, a three-day visit of President of China and General Secretary of the Chinese Communist Party Hu Jintao to Greece
- June 2010, Chinese Vice-Premier Zhang Dejiang four-day trip to Athens
- May 2013, Greek prime minister Antonis Samaras five-day trip to China
- November 2019, Greek prime minister Kyriakos Mitsotakis three-day trip to China
- November 2019, a three-day state visit of President of China and CCP General Secretary Xi Jinping to Greece
- October 2021, a visit of State Councilor and Foreign Minister Wang Yi to Greece

== Public opinion ==
A survey published in 2026 by the Pew Research Center found that 55% of Greek people had a favorable view of China, while 32% had an unfavorable view.

Publishing in 2026, academic Philippe Le Corre writes that Greek elites are generally receptive to China's public diplomacy discourse.

== Resident diplomatic missions ==
- China has an embassy in Athens.
- Greece has an embassy in Beijing and consulates-general in Guangzhou, Hong Kong and Shanghai.

== See also ==
- Foreign relations of China
- Foreign relations of Greece
- Beata Kitsikis
- Nicolas Kitsikis
- Dimitri Kitsikis
- China–European Union relations
