= Aristeidis Stergiadis =

High commissioner of Smyrna during its Greek occupation

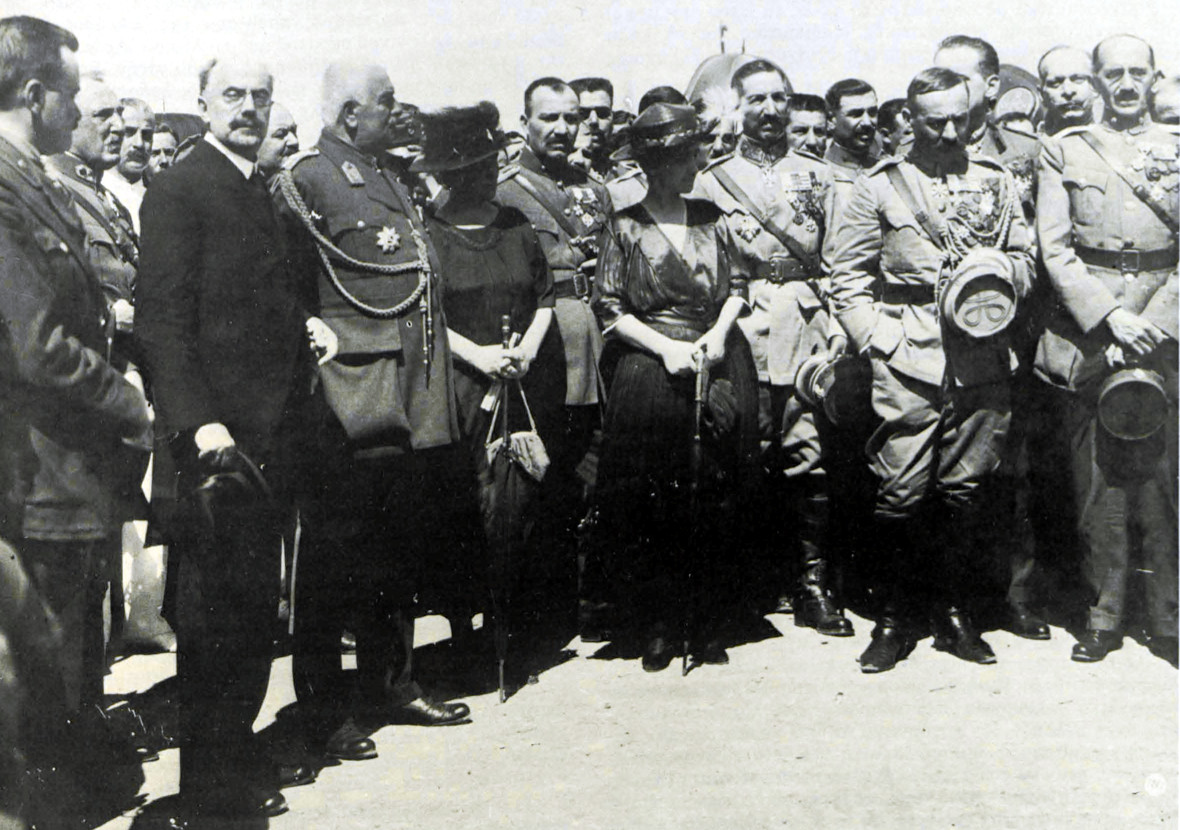
The Greek leadership in Smyrna, October 1920: High Commissioner Aristeidis Stergiadis, Lt. Gen. Leonidas Paraskevopoulos and his chief of staff, Maj. Gen. Theodoros Pangalos.

Aristeidis Stergiadis (Greek: Αριστείδης Στεργιάδης; 1861 – 22 June 1949) was the Greek high commissioner, or governor-general, of Smyrna during the Greek occupation of the city from 1919 to 1922.

== Biography ==
Stergiadis was born in 1861, in Kandiye (Heraklion), Ottoman Crete, Ottoman Empire. He was appointed the High Commissioner of Smyrna in February, and arrived in the city four days after the 15 May 1919 landing. He immediately went to work in setting up an administration, easing ethnic violence, and making plans for permanent annexation of Smyrna. He punished Greek soldiers responsible for the violence on 15–16 May with court-martial, and created a commission to decide on payment for victims (made up of representatives from Britain, France, Italy and other allies).

When the French ceded Cilicia to the Turks in 1921 under the terms of the Treaty of Ankara (1921), the French withdrew their protection from the local Armenian and Greek population. It is estimated that 6,500 Rûm left Cilicia as a result. Some of the refugees were transported to Cyprus, but the British would only accept refugees holding British nationality or those who had relatives on the island. The others were sent to Smyrna, only to find that Stergiadis would not permit the landing of refugees.

Stergiadis stood strictly opposed to discrimination against the Turkish population in Smyrna, and opposed church leaders and the local Greek population on a number of occasions. This was both a genuine stance against discrimination, as well as an attempt to maintain order and to not complicate the relationship with allied representatives. Indeed, he was considered a good and impartial governor by Muslims. The Ottoman Mayor of Smyrna, Osmanzade Hacı Hasan Pasha, personally visited Stergiadis to express the Muslim population's gratitude and pleasure.

This opposition to discrimination against the Turkish population often pitted Stergiadis against members of the local Greek population, the church and the army. He reportedly would carry a stick through the town with which he would beat Greeks that were being abusive of Turkish citizens. Troops would disobey his orders to not abuse the Turkish population, often putting him in conflict with the military. On 14 July 1919, the acting foreign secretary sent a long critical telegraph to Venizelos suggesting that Stergiadis be removed, writing that "His sick neuroticism has reached a climax." Venizelos stuck with support of Stergiadis despite this opposition, while the latter oversaw a number of projects planning for a permanent Greek administration of Smyrna. Venizelos himself expected Stergiadis to be impartial to both the Christian and the Muslim element and uphold equality in the administration.

At one point, Stergiadis interrupted and ended a sermon by the bishop Chrysostomos that he believed to be incendiary. George Horton writes:

On one occasion I was present at an important service in the Orthodox Cathedral, to which the representative of the various powers, as well as the principal Greek authorities had been invited. The high-commissioner had given the order that the service should be strictly religious and non-political. Unfortunately, Archbishop Chrysostom (he who was later murdered by the Turks) began to introduce some politics into his sermon, a thing which he was extremely prone to do. Sterghiades, who was standing near him, interrupted, saying: "But I told you I didn’t want any of this." The archbishop flushed, choked, and breaking off his discourse abruptly, ended with, "In the name of the Father, Son and Holy Ghost, Amen," and stepped off the rostrum.

Stergiadis abandoned Smyrna on 25 September 1922 on a British ship, and was transported to Greece. He later relocated and settled in the French city of Nice. He died in Nice on 22 June 1949.

His Herakleion residence houses the Public Archives and Library of Nicolas Kitsikis (1887–1978), father of Dimitri Kitsikis. Stergiadis was the stepfather of Beata Kitsikis née Petychakis, mother of Dimitri Kitsikis.

== Bibliography ==
- Solomonidis, Victoria (1984). "Greece in Asia Minor: The Greek Administration in the Vilayet of Aydin" (PDF). University of London, King's College.
- Dimitri Kitsikis - « Αριστείδης Στεργιάδης », στο Το κτίριο Γερωνυμάκη-Στεργιάδη στη συνοικία Σουλτὰν Ιμπραΐμ, Ηράκλειο, Κρήτη, ΤΕΕ/ΤΑΚ, 2008 (εικονογραφημένο).
- Dimitri Kitsikis - «80 χρόνια από την Μικρασιατική Καταστροφή: Αριστείδης Στεργιάδης», Αθήνα, Τρίτο Μάτι, Καλοκαίρι 2002.
- Dimitri Kitsikis - « Stergiades: l'homme d'une mission impossible, 1919-1922 », in Aux vents des puissances (Jean-Marc Delaunay, éd), Paris, Presses Sorbonne Nouvelle, 2008.
