= Hellenoturkism =

Political concept of unifying Greek and Turkish nations

Hellenoturkism (Greek: Ελληνοτουρκισμός, romanized: Ellinotourkismós; Turkish: Helenotürkizm) is a political concept that encompasses two things: a fact of civilization (i.e. the co-habitation and interdependence, since the 11th century) of the Greek and Turkish peoples and cultures, and a political ideology based on the above civilizational phenomenon, which aims at establishing a Hellenic–Turkish political ensemble, national, and cultural identity.

Most believers in the ideology support differing main principles and points, although generally supported ideas are that, one, both nations and peoples share similar cultures, traditions, histories, and also a mixed genetic similarity.

Such a unification could create a new global and regional, military and economic power within the European Union and NATO, which could also peacefully resolve ongoing disputes between the Cypriot, Greek, and Turkish states and communities such as the Cyprus problem, the Aegean problems, and also Maritime-border disputes in the Mediterranean between the two Cypriot communities and three nations.

== From Empire to Confederation ==
According to Dimitri Kitsikis, from the time of the Persian Empire and Alexander the Great, to the collapse of the Ottoman Empire in the 20th century A.D., the Intermediate Region has been covered by an ecumenical empire that had common civilizational characteristics, despite the fact that it passed into the hands successively of the Persians, to the Greeks, to the Romans, to the Byzantines and, finally, to the Ottomans. This central civilization of the Intermediate Region, existing since the time of Cyrus the Great, bore the characteristics, since the 11th century A.D. and for the last thousand years, of Greek and Turkish cultures. The Ecumenicity of the Empire was Hellenoturkism.

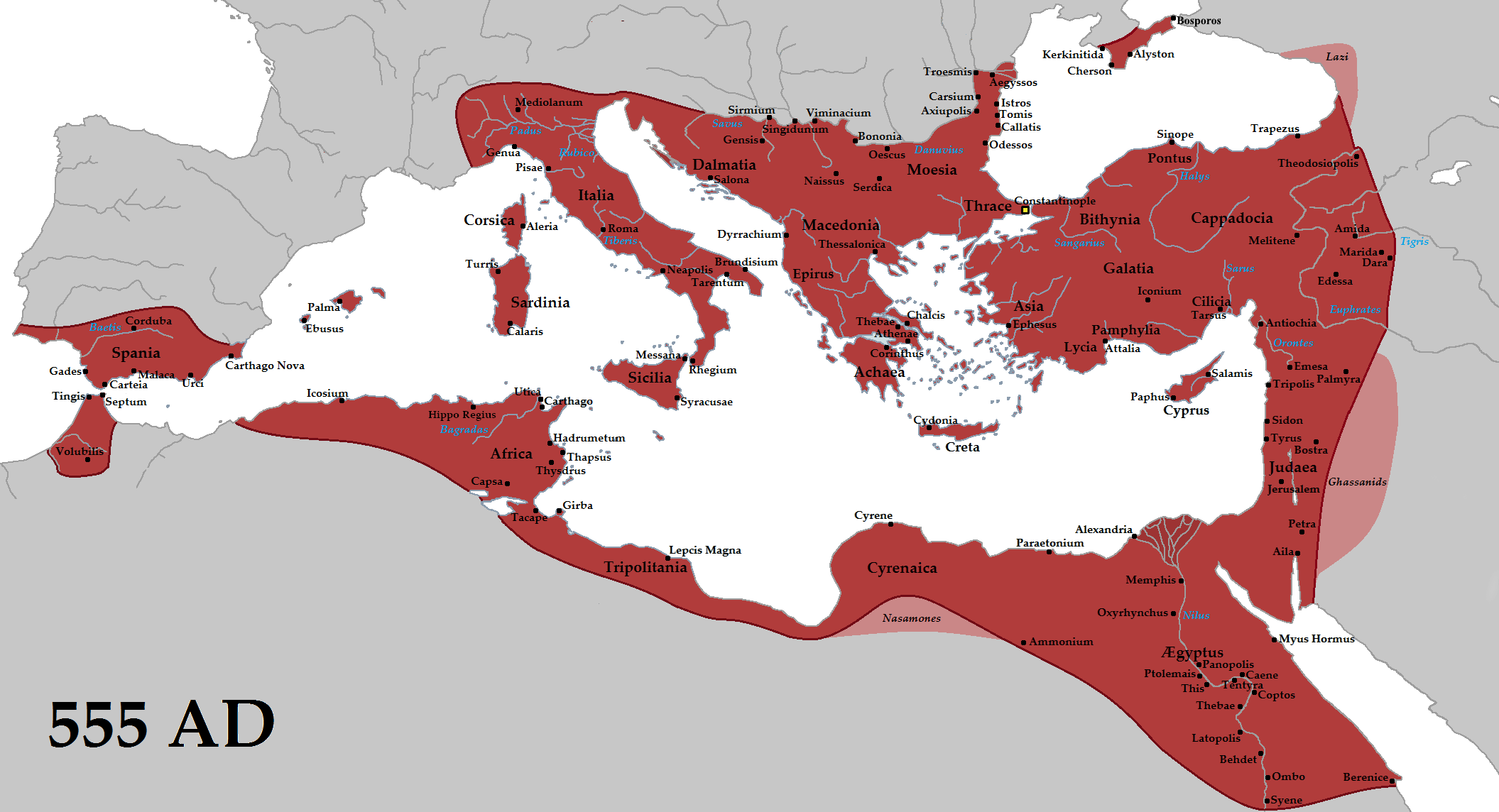

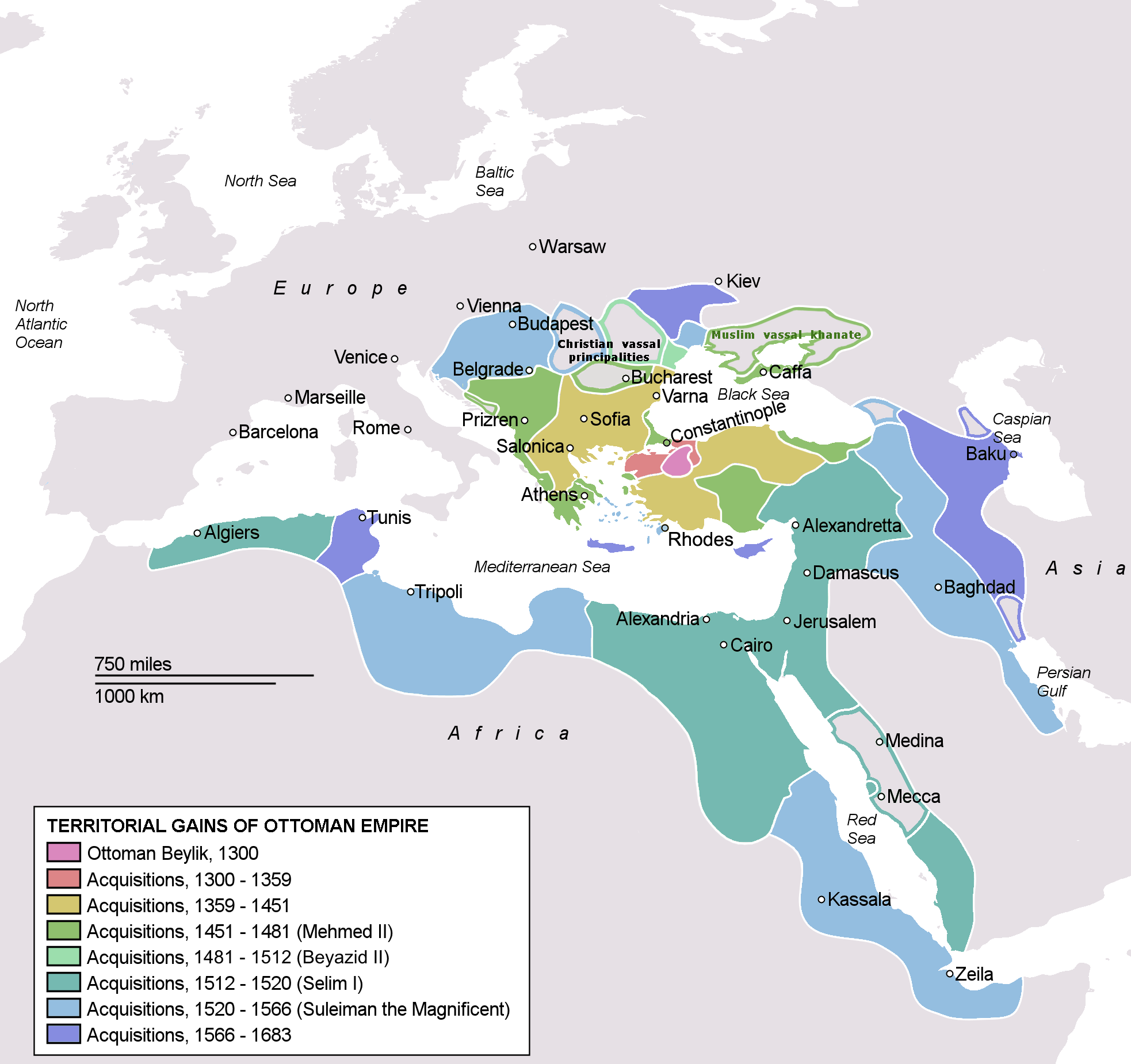
Maps of the Byzantine Empire (Eastern Rome) in the mid 6th century (top), and the Ottoman Empire in the late 17th century (bottom), with their capitals in Constantinople (Istanbul).

== Founding and premise ==
In the 15th century, a Greek philosopher, George of Trebizond, 1395-1484 (the date of his death varies from 1472 to 1486 depending on the sources), who aimed at synthesizing Islam in the form of Alevism and Christianity in the form of Greek Orthodoxy, is considered by some supporters of Hellenoturkism as one of the main thinkers and founders of their ideology. He addressed the new ruler of the Empire, Fatih, or Mehmed the Conqueror, in a letter of 1466 as the legal emperor of the Romans and of the whole earth, and also as the common emperor of both Romans and Turks.

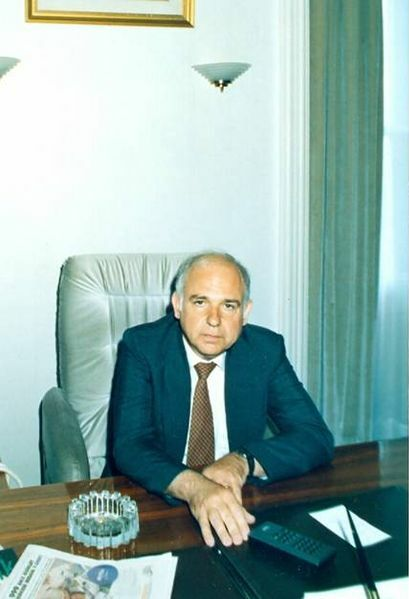
Dimitri Kitsikis at his office inside the Çankaya Köşkü Presidential Mansion in Ankara, Turkey, 1990, when he was an adviser to Turkish President Turgut Özal.

In the 20th century, the ideology of Hellenoturkism was revived by the historian Dimitri Kitsikis who beginning in 1966, with numerous books, articles and conference papers focussed on the subject, and with political activity in both Greece and Turkey, as an advisor of both Greek President Konstantinos Karamanlis and of Turkish President Turgut Özal, strove to establish the basis of a Turkish-Greek Confederation.

According to proponents, a bilingual "Greek Turkish Confederation" (East Mediterranean Confederation) between Greece, Turkey and Cyprus (with national capitals in Athens, Ankara and Nicosia, and Confederation parliament in Istanbul) would (to an extent) be a reincarnation of the Byzantine/Ottoman Empires; thus filling the political, cultural and economic vacuum left behind by the absence of these two historic superpowers in the East Mediterranean region. It would have the largest economy and military in the area covering the Balkans, the Middle East, the East Mediterranean, the Caucasus and Central Asia, and could become a key global great power due to its geographic location.

However today, Hellenoturkism has little support in Turkey or Greece (excluding Cyprus). Although it has significantly grown in recognition, support and popularity as a result of its presentation in digital media and online platforms or forums.

Meanwhile in the recognized Cyprus and unrecognized North Cyprus; the ideas of a united Cypriot federation, Taksim (Partition between Greece & Turkey) by Turks, and Enosis (Unification with Greece) by Greeks are more common.

== Notable supporters and supporting works ==
=== Personalities ===
- Dimitri Kitsikis, political advisor
- Georgios Papadopoulos, main perpetrator of the Greek Junta in 1967:

According to Yannis Mazis, professor of Turkology & Eurasian Sciences in Boğaziçi University; Papadopulos "saw the possibility of such a confederation as realistic, and possible to come true within the next 40 years at that time".

=== Works ===
- "Türk-Yunan Şiiri" (Turko-Greek poem), or also known as "Olmasın Varsın" (Be it not happen), was a friendship poem between the two nations and peoples written by the former prime minister of Turkey, Bülent Ecevit, during his early years as a writer and poet in London, 1947. The poem has been composed by several musicians, Fikret Kızılok is one of them.

== See also ==
- Byzantinism
- Cypriotism
- Greece–Turkey relations
- Foreign policy of the Recep Tayyip Erdoğan government
- Eastern Party in Greece
- Intermarium
- Eurasianism
- Mediterraneanism
- Neo-Ottomanism
- Ottoman Greeks
- Greeks in Turkey
- Greek Muslims
- Turco-Mongol
- Turco-Persian

== Bibliography ==
- Franz Babinger, Mehmed der Eroberer und seine Zeit. Weltenstürmer einer Zeitenwende. München, 1953.
- Georges Corm, Le Moyen-Orient, Paris, Flammarion, 1993.
- На перекрестке цивилизаций: Поль Лемерль, История Византии. Димитрис Кицикис, Османская империя. Весь Мир, 2006 г. -Na perekrestke tsivilizatsiy : Istorija Vizantii- Osmanskaja Imperija (Paul Lemerle-Dimitri Kitsikis) – Moscow, Ves Mir Editions, 2006.
- Georgios Metallinos, Πολιτικὴ καὶ Θεολογία: Ἰδεολογια καὶ πράξη τοῦ ῥιζοσπάστη πολιτικοῦ Γεωργίου Τυπάλδου-'Ιακωβάτου, Katerini, Tertios, 1990. (Politics and Theology: Ideology and Practice of the Radical Politician Georgios Typaldos-Iakovatos)
- Georgios Metallinos, "Ἡ ῥωμαίϊκη πλευρὰ τοῦ ἑλληνοτουρκισμοῦ", Tote, no.45, November–December 1993.
- Dimitri Kitsikis, Türk-Yunan İmparatorluğu. Arabölge gerçeği ışığında Osmanlı Tarihine bakış – İstanbul, İletişim Yayınları, 1996. (The Turkish-Greek Empire. An inquiry into Ottoman History through the prism of the Intermediate Region).
- Dimitri Kitsikis, "Ἡ ἀνατολικὴ παράταξη στἢν Ἑλλάδα", Tote, no. 27, August 1985.
- Dimitri Kitsikis, Ἡ σημασία τοῦ Μπεκτασισμοῦ-'Αλεβισμοῦ γιὰ τὸν Ἑλληνισμό -Athens, Hekate, 2006 (The Importance of Bektashism-Alevism for Hellenism)
- Georgios Zoras, Γεώργιος ὁ Τραπεζούντιος καὶ αἱ πρὸς ἑλληνοτουρκικὴν συνεννόησιν προσπάθειαι αὐτοῦ -Athens, University of Athens, 1954 (George of Trebizond and his Efforts to Bring About a Greek-Turkish Understanding).
- Konstantinos Amantos, Σχέσεις Ἑλλήνων καὶ Τούρκων ἀπὸ τοῦ ἐνδεκάτου αἰῶνος μέχρι τὸ 1821 - Athens, 1955 (Relations between Greeks and Turks from the 11th Century up to 1821).
- Emmanuel Sivan, L'Islam et la Croisade. Idéologie et propagande dans les réactions musulmanes aux croisades, Paris, Maisonneuve, 1968.
- Ioannis Loukas, "Τεκτονικὲς οἱ ῥίζες τοῦ ἑλληνοτουρκισμοῦ", Tote, no. 42, May–June 1993 (The Freemason Roots of Hellenoturkism).
- Herkül Millas, "Türk-Yunan Birliği ve Kitsikis", Toplum ve Bilim, nos 43-44, Fall 1988 (Turkish-Greek Union and Kitsikis).
- G. Alexandrou, "Ἑλληνοτουρκικὴ Ὁμοσπονδία. Τὰ ἀπόκρυφα σχέδια τοῦ Τουργκοὺτ Ὀζάλ", Greek Forum, vol 17, no.9/195, October 1990 (Greek-Turkish Federation. The Secret Projects of Turgut Özal).
- Christos Ch. Kypraios,The Ideology of Hellenoturkism: From George of Trebizond to Dimitri Kitsikis -Istanbul, Bilgi University, 2015 (MA thesis, 107 pages, with maps and charts).
- Turgay Cin, "Türk-Yunan İmparatorluğu Gerçeği", ss.327-341, Balkan Savaşların 100.yılı, Bağcılar Belediye Başkanlığı, İstanbul, 2012, 694 s.
