= Dimitri Kitsikis =

Greek academic (1935–2021)

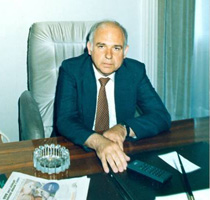
- Born: 2 June 1935; Athens, Greece
- Died: 28 August 2021 (aged 86); Ottawa, Canada
- Spouse: Ada Nikolarou
- Children: 2

Education
- Education: University of Paris; Graduate Institute of International and Development Studies

Philosophical work
- Era: Contemporary
- Institutions: University of Ottawa
- Main interests: Turkology; Byzantinology; Sinology; cultural studies; geopolitics; international relations; political philosophy; religious studies; psychology
- Notable ideas: Intermediate Region, Eastern Party in Greece and Turkey, Hellenoturkism, Alevi–Bektashi Ottomanism, neo-Ottomanism, Anti-parliamentarism, Laocracy, National Bolshevism

Dimitri Kitsikis (Greek: Δημήτρης Κιτσίκης; 2 June 1935 – 28 August 2021) was a Greek philosopher, Turkologist and Sinologist, as well as a professor of international relations and geopolitics. He also published poetry in French and Greek.

== Life ==
Kitsikis was a Turkologist and Sinologist Professor of International Relations and Geopolitics at the University of Ottawa in Ottawa, Ontario, Canada since 1970, Fellow of the Royal Society of Canada; he received his doctoral degree in 1963 from the Sorbonne, Paris, under the supervision of Pierre Renouvin. He has been named one of the "three top geopolitical thinkers worldwide, Karl Haushofer, Halford Mackinder and Dimitri Kitsikis". While pursuing his doctoral studies in Paris, he worked from 1960 to 1962 as a research associate at the Graduate Institute of International Studies in Geneva. He belonged to a notable Greek Orthodox family of intellectuals and acclaimed professionals of 19th-century Greece. He held both French and Canadian citizenships, in addition to his Greek citizenship.

His father, Nicolas Kitsikis (1887–1978), rector of the Polytechnic School in Athens, the most famous civil engineer of Greece, was a senator and an MP. His uncle, Konstantinos Kitsikis (1893–1969), a celebrated architect, Nicolas' younger brother, was also a professor at the Athens Polytechnic School. His grandfather, a chief justice, Dimitri Kitsikis senior (1850–1898), had settled in Athens, in 1865, from Lesbos, his native island and was married to Cassandra (Κασσάνδρα), the sister of a member of the Greek Parliament, Dimitri Hatsopoulos (Δημήτρης Χατσόπουλος), 1844–1913, born in Karpenisi.

His mother, Beata Kitsikis née Petychakis (Μπεάτα Πετυχάκη), was born in Herakleion, Crete, from a wealthy Cretan family and Greek Italian nobles from Trieste of mixed Roman Catholic and Orthodox origin. Her father, Emmanuel Petychakis founded a beverage production plant in Cairo, Egypt and her stepfather Aristidis Stergiadis was the High Commissioner of Greece in Smyrna (İzmir) from 1919 to 1922.

During the Greek civil war, at the age of 12, he was sent to a boarding school in Paris, by Octave Merlier, the head of the French Institute in Athens, because his mother had been condemned to death as a communist fighter. He stayed in France for 23 years with his British wife Anne Hubbard, the daughter of a chief justice, whom he had married in Scotland in 1955, with his first two children, Tatiana and Nicolas. He was expelled from the French University for his active participation as a Maoist in the French student revolt of May 1968. Since 1958, Dimitri Kitsikis had traveled to the P.R. of China where he became a committed Maoist. He was then promoted to associate and later to full professor, after being invited to Canada in 1970 by the University of Ottawa. Since then, he has been living and working in Ottawa as well as in Athens, with his second wife, Ada (Αδαμαντία) Nikolarou, whom he married in 1975, the daughter of a farmer from the historic Byzantine town of Mystras, near Sparta and with whom he has two more children, Dr. Agis Ioannis Kitsikis, Swiss Re Head for Canada and Kranay Kitsikis-De Leonardis. He was an admirer of the Byzantine Empire. Kitsikis was thus a Panhellenist, a cosmopolitan Greek, holding Greek citizenship, in addition to French and Canadian ones.

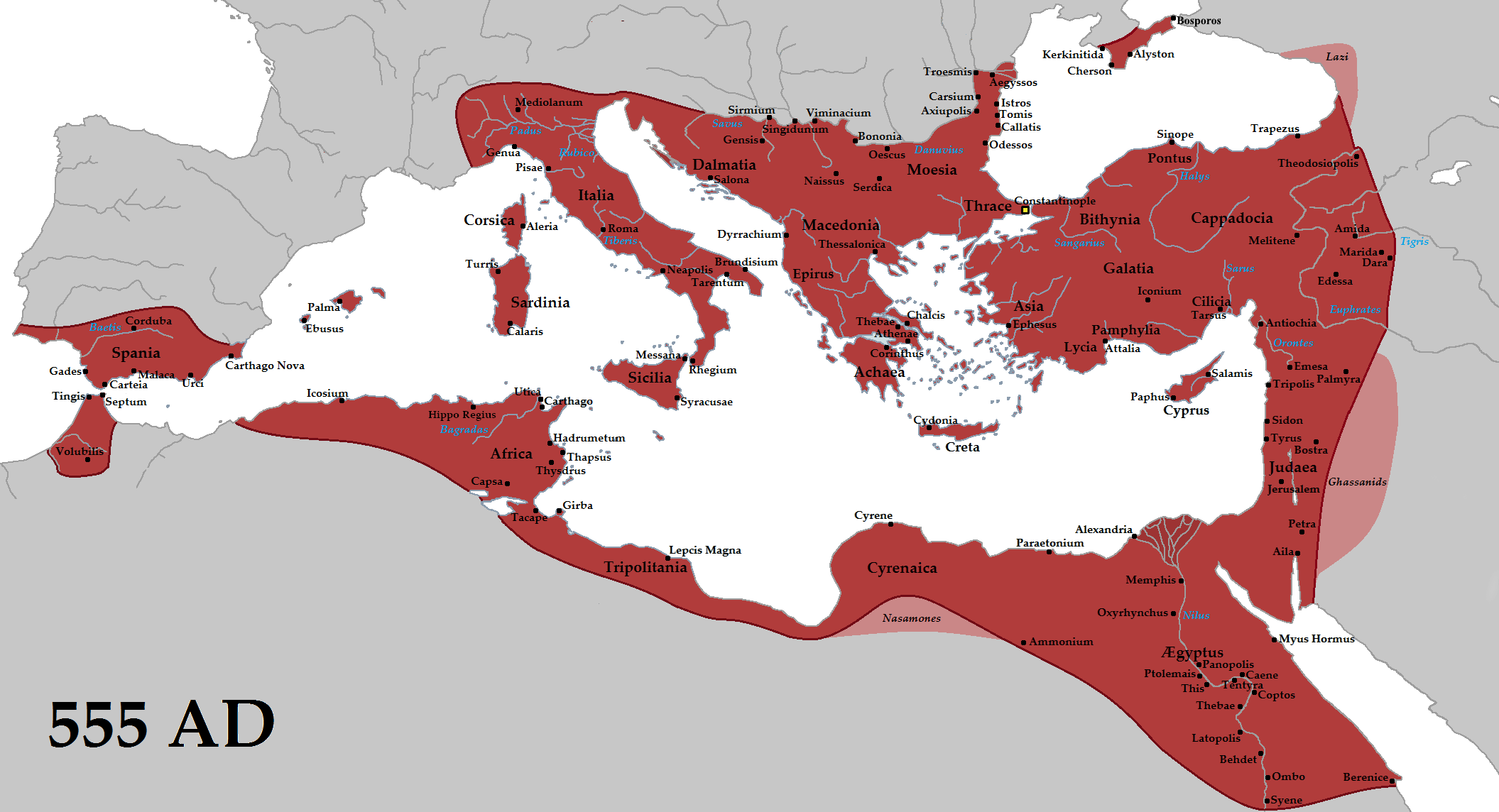

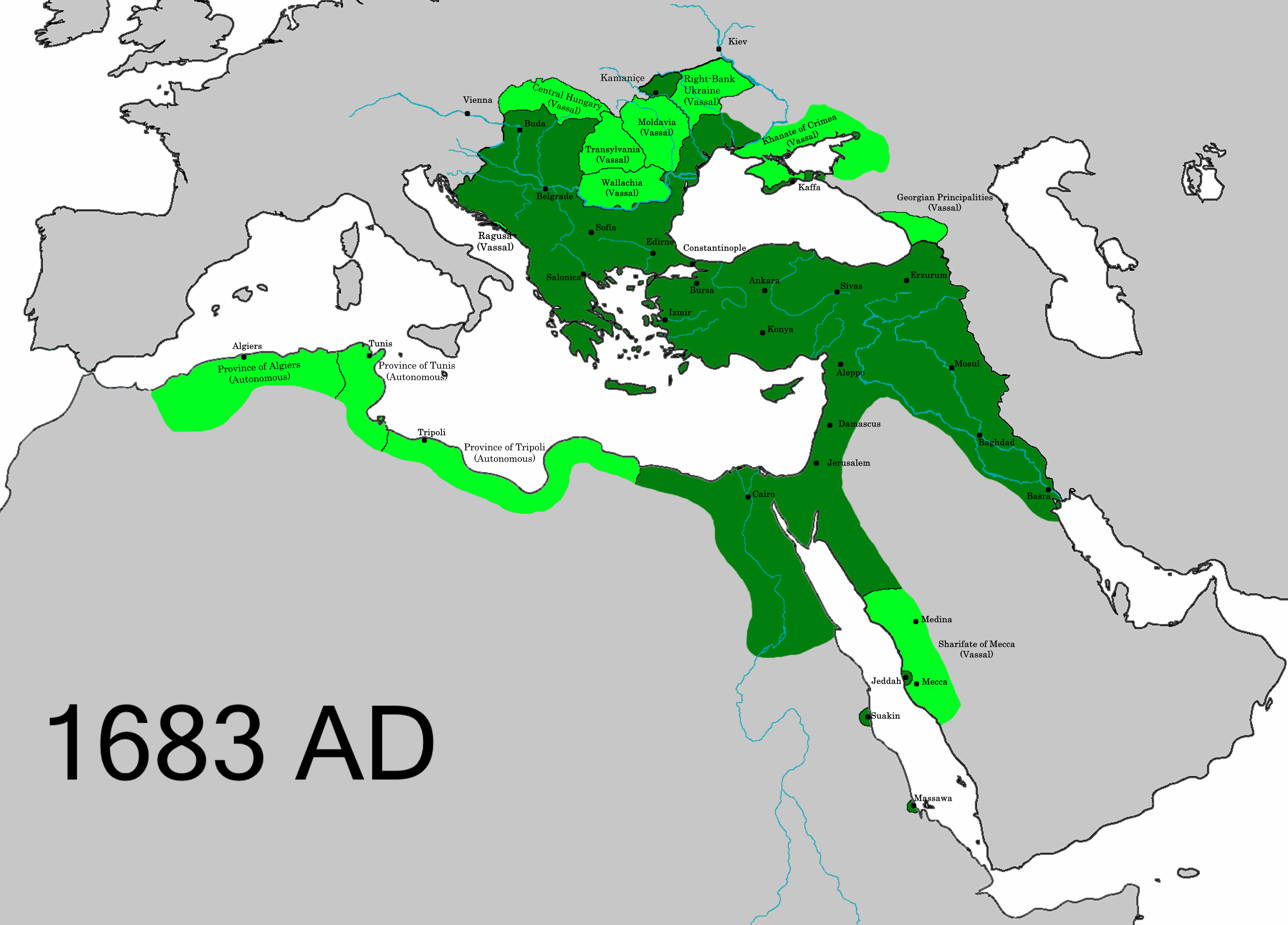
Maps of the Byzantine Empire in the mid 6th century (top) and the Ottoman Empire in the late 17th century (bottom), with their capitals in Constantinople (Istanbul).

Since he was a child he had an idée fixe: He wanted not only to reconcile Greeks and Turks, but also to unite them into a Greek Turkish Confederation which would (to an extent) be a reincarnation of the Byzantine/Ottoman Empires; thus filling the political, cultural and economic vacuum that's left behind by their absence in the East Mediterranean region. A devout Orthodox Christian, he came to sympathise with the Turkish religion of Alevi–Bektashism and sought to ally it with Orthodoxy, in order to form a basis for a future political union between Athens and Ankara. Believing in the collaboration of religious communities, as in the millet system of the Ottoman Empire, he worked closely with Shia Muslims in Iran, Jews in Israel and Hindu vaishnavs in India. His elder son Nicolas has been a Vaishnav since 1984 and lives with his Hindu wife in the Vaishnav community of Gainesville, Florida. Although a member of the official Church of Greece, he always sympathised with the Old-Calendarist movement, the adherents of which reject the Church's use of the Gregorian (New) calendar and maintain a traditionalist attitude towards Christian life and worship. As Orthodoxy prevailed over the heresy of Iconoclasm in the 9th century and restored the use of the icon in Christian worship, he stood convinced that the Old Calendar will once again be adopted by those Orthodox Churches which rejected it in the earlier part of the 20th century.

Since the 1970s he has taught Chinese and Turkish history, political ideologies and geopolitics at a number of universities in the West. His plethora of books have been translated in many languages, while articles concerning his work have been published in Chinese, South Slavic languages, German, French, Albanian, English, Spanish, Portuguese and Russian. He also taught at Boğaziçi University in Istanbul, where he had as a student, the future prime minister of Turkey, Ahmet Davutoğlu. Kitsikis is considered to have had a decisive influence, on Davutoğlu's geopolitical theory.

Later, he taught at Bilkent University in Ankara and Gediz University in İzmir and became one of the closest friends and advisers of the President of the Turkish Republic, Turgut Özal. In Greece, he was resident researcher at the National Institute of Social Studies and taught at Deree College, the American College in Athens.

He was a public figure in Greece and had been a close friend and advisor of Greek Premier Konstantinos Karamanlis senior in the 1960s and 1970s. He contributed regularly with political articles to Greek magazines and, since 1996, published in Athens a Greek quarterly journal of Geopolitics named after his civilisation model, «Endiamese Perioche, Ἐνδιάμεση Περιοχή» or "Intermediate Region".

Named after his father, who died in 1978, the "Nikos Kitsikis Library and Archives" resides in the home of family member, the former high commissioner of Smyrna (during the Greek occupation of the city between 1919 and 1922) Aristidis Stergiadis (1861–1949), in Herakleion, Crete. Dimitri Kitsikis was honoured by the Greek State in 2006. The latter established and financed the "Dimitri Kitsikis Public Foundation and Library" in Athens.

== Work ==
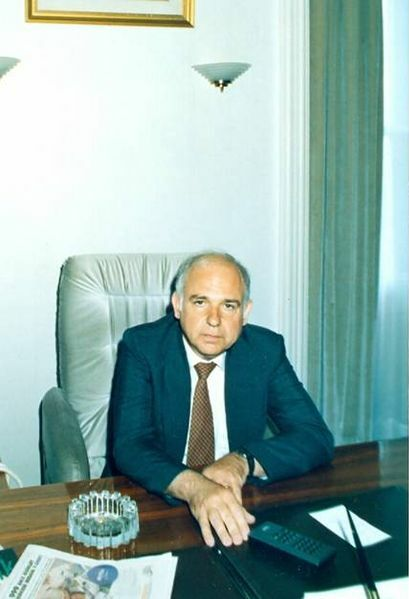
Kitsikis at his office inside the Çankaya Köşkü Presidential Mansion in Ankara, Turkey, 1990, when he was an adviser to Turkish President Turgut Özal.

Kitsikis, since the 1960s, has been the recognised theorist, first in Greece and then in Turkey, of the idea of a Greek-Turkish Confederation, which he has promoted by influencing statesmen, politicians, journalists, artists and thinkers in both countries. His books in Turkish became best sellers in Turkey and were praised by the Prime Minister of Turkey. He kept close ties with Prime Ministers Konstantinos Karamanlis senior of Greece and Turgut Özal of Turkey as well as the Chinese leaders Mao Zedong and Deng Xiaoping. His books in Greek created one of the greatest controversies ever encountered in Greek historiography. They were even debated in the Greek Parliament. The well-established notion of Greeks enslaved by Turks and a series of beliefs on the Ottoman Empire, which had been traditionally taught in schools and universities throughout Greece, such as the story of the so-called "secret school," were strongly questioned. While his father, Nikos Kitsikis, rector of the Polytechnical School, was a leftist Member of Parliament, Senator and elected Mayor of Athens, Dimitri Kitsikis was averse towards the parliamentary system, which he regarded as foreign to the Greek model of a government by the people or laocracy, Greek "λαοκρατία".

He has been the initiator in France of the branch of the History of International Relations that deals with propaganda and pressure as a government weapon of foreign policy. He also opened the way to the study of technocracy in international politics. He has insisted that religion is an essential component of international politics and strove by conferences and other means to facilitate the collaboration between the four main religions of Judaism, Christianity, Islam and Hinduism. He organised Orthodox dialogues with Iranian Shiites and Indian Hindus. He worked with Israeli Jews and fundamentalist Catholics from Quebec, where he, along with his students, produced the quarterly journal Aquila (eagle) which, with a double-headed eagle on the front cover promoted the Byzantine imperial idea in Catholic circles. He also worked closely with Fethullah Gülen's Hizmet movement (See Gülen's "Dialog of Civilizations Platform"). However, the idea of a global hellenism is prevalent in all his works and teaching.

He created a model for a new approach of the three political ideologies of liberalism, fascism and communism, and he has published on the history of China. He is the founder of the branch of study known as Photohistory.

He is also a recognised poet, with six collections of poetry published by Pierre Jean Oswald (Paris), Naaman (Québec), Kedros (Κέδρος), Hestia (Ἑστία) and Akritas (Ἀκρίτας). In 1991, he was honored with the first Greek-Turkish prize for poetry Abdi İpekçi, a Turkish journalist who had been shot dead by terrorists. Some of his poetry books, namely Omphalos (1977), l'Orocc dans l'âge de Kali (1985) and le Paradis perdu sur les barricades (1989–1993), became part of an anthology of 32 Canadian poets in the book by H. Bouraoui and J. Flamand. His poetic work was included in the Dictionnaire des citations littéraires de l'Ontario français, depuis 1960. His poems were also used in the books by the Greek artist Georgette Kambani.

Kitsikis regarded the Greek language as the cornerstone of planetary civilization, and he thus deemed it an honour for one to be able to write in Greek. He believed that the treatment of the language should be taken out of the hands of Greek philologists who are currently destroying it. He defended the continued use of polytonic Greek, traditional spelling and the freedom to write in any literary tone. He regarded as erroneous only the implementation of a Greek form not used from the time of Homer to today.

He is the founder of four concepts setting a novel approach for the history of the Greek-Turkish Area to be understood: a) The "Intermediate Region" (Endiamese Perioche, Ἐνδιάμεση Περιοχή) of civilisation, extending from the Adriatic Sea to the Indus River, between the Euro-American West and the Hindu-Chinese East. b) Eastern Party in Greece and Turkey (Ἀνατολικὴ Παράταξις) versus Western Party (Δυτικὴ Παράταξις) as an antagonist couple; c) Hellenoturkism (Ἑλληνοτουρκισμός) as an ideology and as a phenomenon of culture for the last one thousand years; d) Alevi–Bektashi religious origin of the Ottoman Dynasty, the Islamisation of which developed hand-in-hand with its secularisation and westernisation.

In 2007, A Comparative History of Greece and China from Antiquity to the Present was published. The book is notable in that it homes in on the relationship between the two civilisations throughout their entire history spanning three millennia. The study raises two concepts: 1) the Greek-Chinese civilisation in a global context and 2) its political expression during the last 2500 years, that is, ecumenical empire as a glorified organisational model.

Ahead of the September 2015 general elections in Greece, Kitsikis as a supporter of the KKE, the Communist Party of Greece, endorsed tactically the Golden Dawn party, calling it an electoral choice to help the defeat of Syriza social democracy.

Since 1996, Kitsikis has written for a Greek language, self-published geopolitical quarterly called Intermediate Region wherein he extensively discusses his Hellenoturkist viewpoints and his nationalistic outlook, describing the aims of the journal as "to give the knowledge that will enable the revolutionary overthrow of the structure of the present provincial little state of Athens and the building up of a national regime".

== Influence on Turkish politics ==
Kitsikis was former prime minister Ahmet Davutoğlu's professor as well as a close adviser of former President Turgut Özal. He is considered to have had a decisive influence, on Davutoğlu's geopolitical theory.

Kitsikis wrote in both his Facebook and Twitter accounts, the day after the Turkish referendum 2017: "Christ is risen! The Empire is risen! The Ottoman world is risen! The Intermediate Region has come to life again! Long live president Erdoğan! Fethullah Gülen, his former spiritual father, has lost, but his ideas, through his pupil Erdoğan, have triumphed."

== The Dimitri Kitsikis Public Foundation ==
The Dimitri Kitsikis Public Foundation in Athens, Greece, was formally established under Presidential Decree 129, A 190 (pp. 3425, 3430–3431). The Presidential Decree was published 15 September 2008, in the Gazette of the Government of Greece (ΦΕΚ).

== Published works ==
(Excluding articles)

- Propagande et pressions en politique internationale. La Grèce et ses revendications à la Conférence de la Paix, 1919–1920 – Paris, Presses Universitaires de France, 1963.
- Yunan propagandası –İstanbul, Meydan Neşriyat, 1964. (2nd edition : İstanbul, Kaynak Kitaplar,1974)
- « La Grèce électorale », International Guide to Electoral Statistics (edited by Stein Rokkan and Jean Meyriat), Paris, Mouton, 1969.
- « La question chypriote », Encyclopaedia Universalis – Paris, vol.4, 1969.
- « De la Grèce byzantine à la Grèce contemporaine », Encyclopaedia Universalis – Paris, vol. 7, 1970.
- « Information et Décision. La Grèce face à l'invasion allemande dans les Balkans, 1940-1941», in La Guerre en Méditerranée – Paris, Centre national de la Recherche scientifique, 1971.
- « Nationalisme dans les Balkans : Etude comparée des révolutions turque de 1908 et grecque de 1909 », The Canadian Historical Association. Historical Papers 1971.
- Le rôle des experts à la Conférence de la Paix. Gestation d'une technocratie en politique internationale - Ottawa, Editions de l'Université d'Ottawa, 1972.
- Ἡ Ἑλλάς τῆς 4ης Αὐγούστου καί αἱ Μεγάλαι Δυνάμεις. Τά ἀρχεῖα τοῦ Ἑλληνικοῦ Ὑπουργείου Ἐξωτερικῶν, 1936-1941 - Athens, Ikaros, 1974. (2nd edition : Athens, Eleuthere Skepsis, 1990).
- «Eleuthère Vénizélos», Hommes d'Etat célèbres – Paris, (edited by François Crouzet), Editions Mazenod, vol. 5, 1975.
- Omphalos, Poème – Paris, Pierre Jean Oswald, 1977.
- Ἑλλάς καί ξένοι, 1919–1967. Ἀπό τά ἀρχεῖα τοῦ Ἑλληνικοῦ Ὑπουργείου Ἐξωτερικῶν - Athens, Hestia, 1977.
- Συγκριτικὴ Ἱστορία Ἑλλάδος καὶ Τουρκίας στὸν 20ό αἰῶνα - Athens, Hestia, 1978. (2nd edition supplemented : Hestia, 1990. 3rd edition: Hestia, 1998).
- « Grande Idée et hellénoturquisme. Essai d'interprétation nouvelle de l'histoire néo-grecque », Actes du IIe Congrès international des Etudes du Sud-Est européen, 1970 – Athènes, Association internationale des Etudes du Sud-Est européen, 1978, tome III.
- Ὀμφαλός, Ποίημα – Athens, Kedros, 1979.
- Yırmı Asırda Karşılaştırmalı Türk-Yunan Tarihi – İstanbul, Türk Dünyası Araştırmaları Dergisi, II-8, 1980. (20th Century Turkish-Greek Comparative History).
- Ἱστορία τοῦ ἑλληνοτουρκικοῦ χώρου ἀπό τόν Ἐ. Βενιζέλο στὸν Γ. Παπαδόπουλο, 1928-1973 - Athens, Hestia, 1981. (2nd edition supplemented : Hestia, 1995).
- « Bulgaria in Balkan History between the Two World Wars », Pervi Mejdunaroden Kongres po Bulgaristika Dokladi (First International Conference on Bulgarian Studies), Sofia, Bulgarian Academy of the Sciences, 1982.
- L' Orocc, dans l'âge de Kali. Poème – Sherbrooke (Québec), Naaman, 1985, illustrated.
- L'Empire ottoman – Paris, Presses Universitaires de France, 1985. (Collection « Que sais-je ? », no. 2222). 2nd ed. 1991. 3rd ed. 1994.
- « L'espace ottoman dans l'esprit de Charles de Moüy, dans la deuxième moitié du XIXe siècle », L'Empire ottoman, la République de Turquie et la France (edited by H. Batu) –Paris - Istanbul, Isis, 1986.
- « Κύπρος 1955-1959 : Τριτοκοσμικὴ συνειδητοποίηση καὶ ἐπιπτώσεις ἐπὶ τῆς Ἑλλάδος », Cypriot Studies Society. Proceedings of the 2nd International Cypriological Conference– vol. 3, Nicosia, 1987.
- Greek Synthetic Thought. An Opposition to Western Divisive Thought of the Renaissance – San Francisco, Bhaktivedanta Institute, 1988.
- Ἱστορία τῆς Ὀθωμανικῆς Αὐτοκρατορίας, 1280-1924 - Athens, Hestia, 1988, 244 pages (2nd ed., 1989, 3rd ed. expanded, 1996, 316 pages, 4th ed. 2003, 5th ed. 2013, 318 pages)
- El Imperio otomano – México, Fondo de Cultura Econόmica, 1989.
- Ὁ Ἄνδυς στὸν καιρὸ τῆς Καλῆς. Ποίημα - Athens, Hestia, 1989. (Illustrated by Georgette Κambani).
- « Les Turcs et la mer Egée : essai de géohistoire », Turquie, Moyen-Orient, Communauté européenne (edited by J. Thobie) – Paris, L'Harmattan, 1989.
- Ἡ τρίτη ἰδεολογία καὶ ἡ Ὀρθοδοξία - Athens, Ακρίτας, 1990. (2nd edition, Hestia, 1998).
- «Ὀθωμανικὴ Αὐτοκρατορία», and «Τουρκία», Παγκόσμια Ἱστορία - Athens, τόμος Β', Ἐκδοτικὴ Ἀθηνῶν, 1990.
- Le paradis perdu sur les barricades. Poème – Athens, Akritas, 1993. (Illustrated by Turkish artist Mürşide İçmeli).
- The Old Calendarists and the Rise of Religious Conservatism in Greece – Etna, California, Center for Traditionalist Orthodox Studies, 1995.
- Πτώση. Ποίημα - Athens, Ἀκρίτας, 1996. (Illustrated by Georgette Κambani).
- O Império otomano – Porto, Portugal, Rés Editora, 1996.
- « Ἡ εὐρωπαϊκὴ σκέψη τοῦ Παναγιώτη Κανελλόπουλου », Nea Hestia. A tribute to Panagiotes Kanellopoulos, 1902-1986 - Athens, Hestia, 1996.
- Türk-Yunan İmparatorluğu. Arabölge gerçeği ışığında Osmanlı Tarihine bakış – İstanbul, İletişim Yayınları, 1996. (The Turkish-Greek Empire. An inquiry into Ottoman History through the prism of the Intermediate Region).
- Ἐνδιάμεση Περιοχή – Quarterly journal issued and directed by Dimitri Kitsikis since the Fall of 1996.
- Osmanlijsko carstvo – Belgrad, Yugoslavia, Platon Editions, 1998.
- Османската империя -Димитри Кицикис - ИК Кама, 2000 -Osmanskata Imperija – Sofia, Bulgaria, Kama Editions, 2000.
- Τὸ Βυζαντινὸ πρότυπο διακυβερνήσεως καὶ τὸ τέλος τοῦ κοινοβουλευτισμοῦ, Athens, Esoptron, 2001.
- Pratiques sociales (edited by Jean-Pierre Wallot) – Ottawa, Les Presses de l'Université d'Ottawa, 2002.
- Pour une Etude scientifique du fascisme – Nantes, Ars Magna Editions, (Les Documents), 2005.
- Jean-Jacques Rousseau et les origines françaises du fascisme – Nantes, Ars Magna Editions, (Les Documents), 2006.
- Le national-bolchevisme – Nantes, Ars Magna Editions, (Les Documents), 2006.
- На перекрестке цивилизаций: Поль Лемерль, История Византии. Димитрис Кицикис, Османская империя. Весь Мир, 2006 г. -Na perekrestke tsivilizatsiy : Istorija Vizantii- Osmanskaja Imperija (Paul Lemerle-D. Kitsikis) – Moscow, Ves Mir Editions, 2006. (Civilisations at the Crossroads : Byzantine History - Ottoman History).
- Ἡ σημασία τοῦ μπεκτασισμοῦ-ἀλεβισμοῦ γιὰ τὸν ἑλληνισμό - Athens, Hekate, 2006.
- Συγκριτικὴ Ἱστορία Ἑλλάδος-Κίνας ἀπὸ τὴν ἀρχαιότητα μέχρι σήμερα ("A Comparative History of Greece and China from Antiquity to the Present") - Athens, Herodotos Press, 2007, 346 pages.
- «Anti-Atatürk: A Psychological Portrait of Stergiades, "Dictator of Ionia" in 1919–1922, the Greek that failed to Conquer Turkey», Proceedings of the 2nd International Conference of Eastern and African Studies, Gastoune, 2007.
- La montée du national-bolchevisme dans les Balkans. Le retour à la Serbie de 1830 – Paris, Avatar Editions, 2008.
- Ἐθνικομπολσεβικισμός. Πέραν τοῦ φασισμοῦ καὶ τοῦ κομμουνισμοῦ. Ἡ ἐπιρροή του στὰ Βαλκάνια - Athens, Hellenike Anodos, 2010.
- Saint Nicodemos the Hagiorite - Christian Morality - Belmont, Massachusetts, Institute for Byzantine and Modern Greek Studies, 2012. (Contribution to the translation)
- Περί Ηρώων: Οι ήρωες και η σημασία τους για τον σύγχρονο ελληνισμό («About Heroes: Heroes and their Importance for Contemporary Hellenism»)- Athens, Herodotos Press, 2014, 471 pages.
- "Τουρκία, 1908-2010" [Turkey, 1908-2010], in Χρήστος Αντωνιάδης, editor, Βαλκάνια.Η μεγάλη τρικυμία [The Balkans. The Great Upheaval], Athens, Kastalia Press, 2018, 556 pages, ISBN 9786185279035
- Ἡ Ἑλλὰς τῆς 4ης Αὐγούστου καὶ οἱ Μεγάλες Δυνάμεις-Τρίτη ἔκδοσις βελτιωμένη καὶ μὲ προσθῆκες[Greece of 4 August and the Great Powers], Athens, Herodotos Press, 2018, 250 pages, ISBN 978-960-485-220-8
- Προπαγάνδα καὶ πιέσεις στὴν διεθνῆ πολιτική [Propaganda and Lobbies in International Politics]- Athens, Herodotos Press, 2018, 786 pages, ISBN 978-960-485-261-1
- La Grèce et la Turquie au XXe siècle - Éditions universitaires européennes, 2019, 410 pages, ISBN 978-613-8-43036-0
- Διεθνισμὸς καὶ Ἐθνικισμός. Μία εἰσαγωγή [Perry Anderson - Internationalism. Dimitri Kitsikis - Le nationalisme], Athens, Exodos,2019,135 pages,ISBN 978-618-84162-3-9
- Ἄννεμ-Μάννα: Ἡ μάνα, συμπαντικὴ ἑλληνικὴ γλῶσσα [Annem-Manna: The Mother as Universal Greek Language] - Athens, Exodos,2020,179 pages, ISBN 978-618-84162-4-6
- Φύση καὶ κοινωνία. Ἐπιστολὴ πρὸς Βολταῖρο γιὰ τὸν φυσικὸ νόμο καὶ γιὰ τὴν καταστροφὴ τῆς Λισσαβῶνος,τοῦ Ζάν-Ζὰκ Ῥουσσῶ [Nature and Society. Bilingual French and Greek text]. Εἰσαγωγή-Μετάφραση Δημήτρης Κιτσίκης (Introduction and Translation by Dimitri Kitsikis). Athens, Exodos, 2020,109 pages, ISBN 978-618-84162-8-4
- Ζάν-Ζὰκ Ῥουσσῶ καὶ ἐπιστημονικὸς φασισμός [Jean-Jacques Rousseau and scientific fascism]. Athens, Exodos, 2O21,151 pages, ISBN 978-618-85028-5-7

== See also ==
- Authoritarian socialism
- China-Greece relations
- Clash of Civilizations
- Definitions of fascism
