= Byzantinism =

Political system and culture

Byzantinism, or Byzantism, is the political system and culture of the Byzantine Empire, and its spiritual successors the Orthodox Christian Balkan countries of Greece and Bulgaria especially, and to a lesser extent Serbia and some other Orthodox countries in Eastern Europe like Belarus, Georgia, Russia and Ukraine. The term Byzantinism itself was coined in the 19th century.

The term has been criticized by modern scholars for being a generalization that is not very representative of the reality of the Byzantine aristocracy and bureaucracy.

== Aristocracy and bureaucracy ==
The Byzantine Empire is a term used to describe the Roman Empire after its capital was moved to Constantinople in 330 AD and Christianity became the state religion. The Empire survived a thousand years after parts in the west collapsed in 476. It had a complex system of aristocracy and bureaucracy which was evolved from earlier Roman systems. At the apex of the pyramid stood the Emperor, sole ruler and divinely ordained, and beneath him a multitude of officials and court functionaries operated the administrative machinery of the state. A key component of state power was the prestige of the imperial institution and its long antiquity. Ceremony and the granting of both honorific titles and valuable offices was therefore extensive and elaborate.

Over the nearly fifteen hundred years of the empire's existence, different titles were adopted and discarded, and many lost or gained prestige. By the time of Heraclius in the 7th century many of the early Roman titles, grounded in the Latin language and the traditions of the old Roman Republic had become obsolete in the now mostly Greek-speaking empire, although Latin survived longer in law and in the military. Heraclius formally changed the official language to Greek from Latin in 610. Titles inspired by their Greek tradition, often only rough approximation of Latin concepts, became common (i.e. "basileus" [βασιλεύς] instead of "caesar" or "augustus" for the title of the emperor himself). Other titles changed meaning (for example, "Patriarch") or were devalued with time (such as "consul").

Among important qualities of the Empire was also the caesaropapism, the subjugation of church to the state.

== Criticism ==
The Byzantine Empire acquired a negative reputation in the Western world as early as the Middle Ages. The creation of the Holy Roman Empire by Charlemagne in the 9th century and the East–West Schism in the 11th century made the Empire an outcast to the Western European countries following the Roman Church, and the siege and sack of Constantinople during the Fourth Crusade in 1204 only cemented those differences. Hence the European medieval stereotypes of the people of the Byzantine Empire portrayed them as perfidious, treacherous, servile, effeminate and unwarlike.

Medievalist Steven Runciman described the medieval European view of the Byzantine Empire by saying:

Ever since our rough crusading forefathers first saw Constantinople and met, to their contemptuous disgust, a society where everyone read and wrote, ate food with forks and preferred diplomacy to war, it has been fashionable to pass the Byzantines by with scorn and to use their name as synonymous with decadence.

— Steven Runciman, The Emperor Romanus Lecapenus and His Reign: A Study of Tenth-Century Byzantium, 1988

Criticism of the Empire continued among historians of the 18th century and 19th century, particularly in the works of historians and philosophers influenced by the Enlightenment. Edward Gibbon, Hegel, Johann Gottfried Herder, William Lecky, Montesquieu, and Voltaire were among the many Western writers of that period who were critical of the Byzantine system.

Of that Byzantine empire, the universal verdict of history is that it constitutes, without a single exception, the most thoroughly base and despicable form that civilization has yet assumed. There has been no other enduring civilization so absolutely destitute of all forms and elements of greatness, and none to which the epithet "mean" may be so emphatically applied ... The history of the empire is a monotonous story of the intrigues of priests, eunuchs, and women, of poisonings, of conspiracies, of uniform ingratitude.

— William Lecky, A history of European Morals from Augustus to Charlemagne 2 vols. (London 1869) II, 13f.

Its [Byzantium's] general aspect presents a disgusting picture of imbecility: wretched, nay, insane passions, stifles the growth of all that is noble in thoughts, deeds, and persons. Rebellion on the part of generals, depositions of the Emperors by means or through the intrigues of the courtiers, assassinations or poisoning of the Emperors by their own wives and sons, women surrendering themselves to lusts and abominations of all kinds.

— Georg Wilhelm Friedrich Hegel, Lectures on the Philosophy of History

Edward Gibbon, the first English historian to write a full history of the Byzantine Empire in his The History of the Decline and Fall of the Roman Empire (1776–1789), was a sharp critic of the Empire. Jacob Burckhardt, an influential 19th-century historian, shared Gibbon's view:

At its summit was despotism, infinitely strengthened by the union of churchly and secular dominion; in the place of morality it imposed orthodoxy; in the place of unbridled and demoralized expression of the natural instincts, hypocrisy and pretense; in the face of despotism there was developed greed masquerading as poverty, and deep cunning; in religious art and literature there was an incredible stubbornness in the constant repetition of obsolete motifs.

— Jacob Burckhardt, The age of Constantine the Great

Critics pointed out that the Byzantine Empire and its successors were uninfluenced by such major shifts in Western philosophy as the Investiture Controversy, the Reformation and the Renaissance; and reduced the Byzantine political culture to caesaropapism and authoritarian political culture, described as authoritarian, despotic, and imperialistic.

After the fall of the Byzantine Empire, critics of the Byzantine system pointed out that it has survived and "corrupted" other states, in particular, it has been used in the discourse of the political system, culture and society of Russia (from the times of the Grand Principality of Moscow through the Tsardom of Russia to the Russian Empire – see also tsarist autocracy), the Soviet Union, the Ottoman Empire and the Balkan states (the former European provinces of the Ottoman Empire).

Modern historians point out that this negative reputation is not necessarily true, and at the very least, a very simplistic generalization. As a constructed term, Byzantinism also shares those fallacies with a closely related term, Balkanism. Angelov sums it up as follows:

Byzantinism begins from simple stereotypes, passes through reductionism and essentialization, and then proceeds to impute Byzantium's supposed essence onto modern Balkans or Russia as the burden of history. ... As a discourse of "otherness", Byzantinism evolves from, and reflects upon, the West's worst dreams and nightmares about its own self.

— Dimiter G. Angelov, Byzantinism: The Imaginary and Real Heritage of Byzantium in Southeastern Europe

== Praise ==
While the Byzantine Empire was commonly seen in a negative fashion, there were exceptions. Byzantium was rehabilitated in France during the Age of Absolutism, from the 17th century to the French Revolution, in the works of such individuals as the Jesuit Pierre Poussines.

As the Enlightenment swept Western Europe, French traditions found refuge in the Russian Empire. The term Byzantinism was used in a positive context by 19th-century Russian scholar Konstantin Leontiev in Byzantism and Slavdom (1875) to describe the type of society which the Russian Empire needed to counter the "degenerating influence" of the West. Leontiev praised the Byzantine Empire and the tsarist autocracy, and a society and political system that comprises authoritative power of the monarch, devout following of the Russian Orthodox Church, the maintenance of obshchina for peasants, and sharp class division; he also criticized universal education and democracy.

When we mentally picture Byzantinism we see before us as if... the austere, clear plan of a spacious and capacious structure. We know, for example, that in politics it means autocracy. In religion, it means Christianity with distinct features, which distinguish it from Western churches, from heresies and schisms. In the area of ethics we know that the Byzantine ideal does not have that elevated and in many instances highly exaggerated notion of terrestrial human individual introduced into history by German feudalism. We know the inclination of the Byzantine ethical ideal to be disappointed in all that is of this world, in happiness, in the constancy of our own purity, in our capacity here, below, to attain complete moral perfection. We know that Byzantinism (as Christianity in general) rejects all hope of the universal well-being of nations; it is the strongest antithesis of the idea of well-being of nations; it is the strongest antithesis of the idea of humanity in the sense of universal worldly equality, universal worldly freedom, universal worldly perfectibility, and universal contentment.

— Konstantin Leontiev, Byzantism and Slavdom (1875)

In Russian political discourse, Russia is sometimes affectionately called Third Rome, the second Rome being the Byzantine Empire, which outlived its western counterpart at Rome itself, the first Rome, by a thousand years.

In his article, "Was There Ever Byzantinism?" Alexander Mirkovic argued that many Western authors have created an imagined picture of Byzantium as a projection of their own anxieties.

Some scholars focused on the positive aspects of Byzantine culture and legacy, French historian Charles Diehl described the Byzantine Empire by saying:

Byzantium created a brilliant culture, may be, the most brilliant during the whole Middle Ages, doubtlessly the only one existing in Christian Europe before the XI century. For many years, Constantinople remained the sole grand city of Christian Europe ranking second to none in splendour. Byzantium literature and art exerted a significant impact on peoples around it. The monuments and majestic works of art, remaining after it, show us the whole lustre of byzantine culture. That's why Byzantium held a significant place in the history of Middle Ages and, one must admit it, a merited one.

Historian Averil Cameron regards as undeniable the Byzantine contribution to the formation of medieval Europe, and both Cameron and Dimitri Obolensky recognise the major role of Byzantium in shaping Orthodoxy, which in turn occupies a central position in the history, societies and culture of Greece, Romania, Bulgaria, Russia, Georgia, Serbia and other countries. The Byzantines also preserved and copied classical manuscripts, and they are thus regarded as transmitters of classical knowledge, as important contributors to modern European civilisation, and as precursors of both Renaissance humanism and Slavic-Orthodox culture.

== Modern discourse ==
In a modern context it can be used to denote undemocratic practices and the use of violence in political life; it has been often used in the context of South-Eastern European (Balkan) politics. The "baggage" of Byzantine tradition is used to explain the delays in developing democratic institutions, the preference for the strong, even autocratic governments, people's distrust of businessmen and elected politicians, and overall, to explain the difference between the West and South-East and Eastern Europe. The word "Byzantinism" and related, like "Byzantine", have acquired negative connotations in several West European languages, including the English language.

== See also ==
- Byzantine studies
- Byzantine commonwealth
- Caesarism
- Corpus Juris Civilis
- Ecumene
- Eurasianism
- Hellenoturkism
- Megali Idea
- Orthodoxy, Autocracy, and Nationality
- Red tape
- State church of the Roman Empire
- Symphonia (theology)
- Tsarist autocracy

== Sources ==
- Obolensky, Dimitri (1974) [1971]. The Byzantine Commonwealth: Eastern Europe, 500-1453. London: Cardinal. ISBN 9780351176449.
- Cameron, Averil (2009). Οι Βυζαντινοί (in Greek). Athens: Psychogios. ISBN 978-960-453-529-3.
