= Ulrich Middeldorf =

German-American art historian and collector (1901–1983)

Ulrich Alexander Middeldorf (born 23 June 1901 in Staßfurt, Magdeburg administrative district; died 19 February 1983 in Florence) was a German-American art historian.

== Life ==
The son of a mining engineer, he studied art history from 1918 in Giessen (under Christian Rauch), Munich and Berlin, and was awarded his doctorate in 1924 under Adolph Goldschmidt. From 1924 to 1926 he was a scholarship holder at the Kunsthistorisches Institut in Florenz, and from 1927 to 1935 he was in charge of the Institute’s photography collection. Owing to financial difficulties and his ideological opposition to National Socialism, he emigrated to the United States in 1935 and became a professor at the University of Chicago; in 1942, he became an American citizen. From 1953 until his retirement in 1968, he headed the Kunsthistorisches Institut in Florenz. The move to the Palazzo Capponi-Incontri building took place during his tenure.

His area of specialisation was the history of sculpture and medal art of the Italian Renaissance.

In 1969, Middeldorf was awarded the Grand Cross of the Order of Merit of the Federal Republic of Germany with Star.
