= Embassy of Hungary, Beijing =

Coordinates: 39.9390°N 116.4509°E

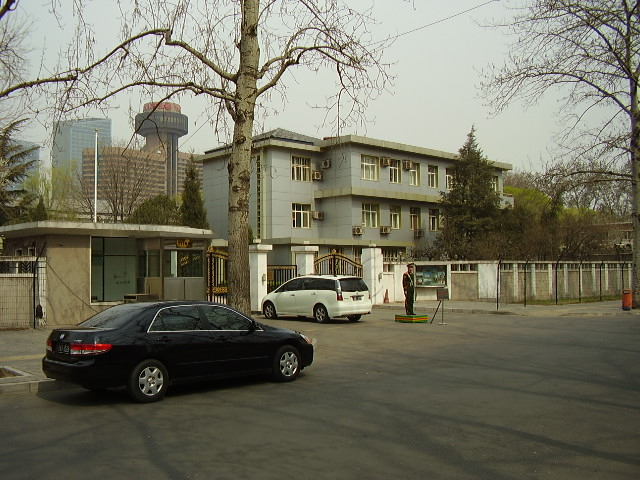
Embassy of Hungary in Beijing

The Embassy of Hungary in Beijing (Hungarian: A Magyar Köztársaság Nagykövetsége - Peking, Kína, Simplified Chinese: 匈牙利驻华大使馆) is the main diplomatic mission of Hungary in Beijing, People's Republic of China. The embassy is also accredited in North Korea and Mongolia.

In August 2008, the Hungarian Embassy hosted victims of the 2008 Sichuan earthquake. The victims toured Hungary and visited bilingual Hungarian-Chinese schools.

== See also ==
- Foreign relations of Hungary
