= Nicolas Kitsikis =

Greek civil engineer and politician

- Νίκος Κιτσίκης
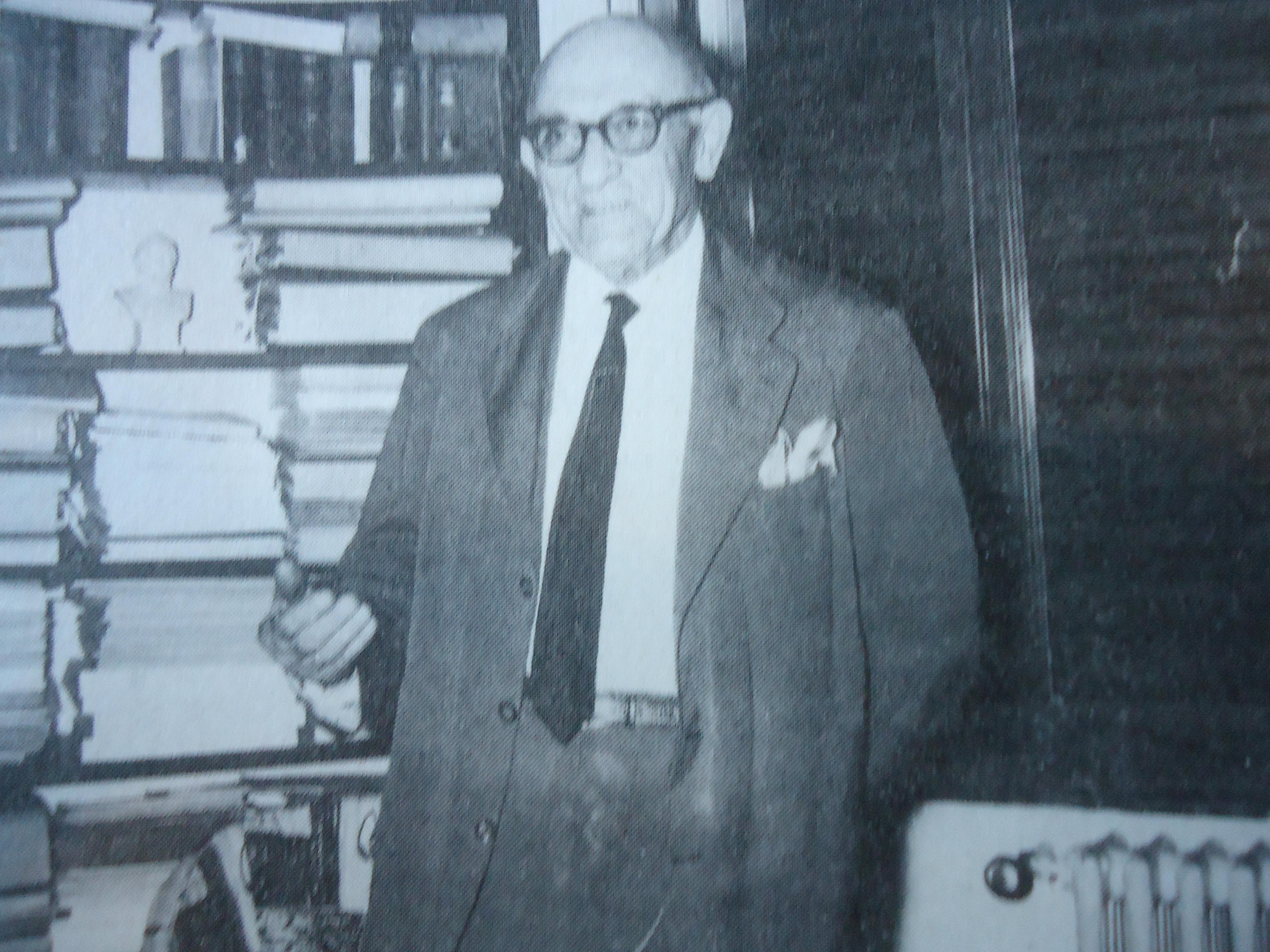
- Nicolas Kitsikis in 1964
- Born: August 14, 1887
- Died: July 26, 1978 (aged 90)
- Education: Athens Polytechnic School, 1907; Technische Universität Berlin
- Employer: Athens Polytechnic School
- Known for: Greek communist
- Spouse: Beata Kitsikis
- Children: Dimitri Kitsikis; Beata Maria Kitsikis Panagopoulos; Elsa Schmid-Kitsikis

Nicolas Kitsikis (Greek: Νίκος Κιτσίκης; August 14, 1887 – July 26, 1978) was a Greek civil engineer and politician. He was a top civil engineer of 20th century Greece, and father of Beata Maria Kitsikis Panagopoulos, Elsa Schmid-Kitsikis and Dimitri Kitsikis. He served as professor and rector of the Athens Polytechnic School, was named doctor honoris causa of the Technische Hochschule in Berlin-Charlottenburg (now Technische Universität Berlin), became a member of the Greek Parliament and Senator during the Interbellum, and joined the EAM-ELAS resistance movement against the German occupation of Greece in 1941–1944. At the liberation of Greece in 1944, he joined the Greek Communist Party and became President of the Greek-Soviet Association in 1945, as well as initiating in 1955, with his wife, Beata Kitsikis, a Communist feminist fighter, the Greece-People's China Association.

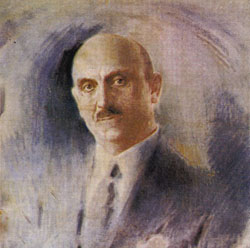
Nicolas Kitsikis. Portrait by Konstantinos Parthenis, 1930

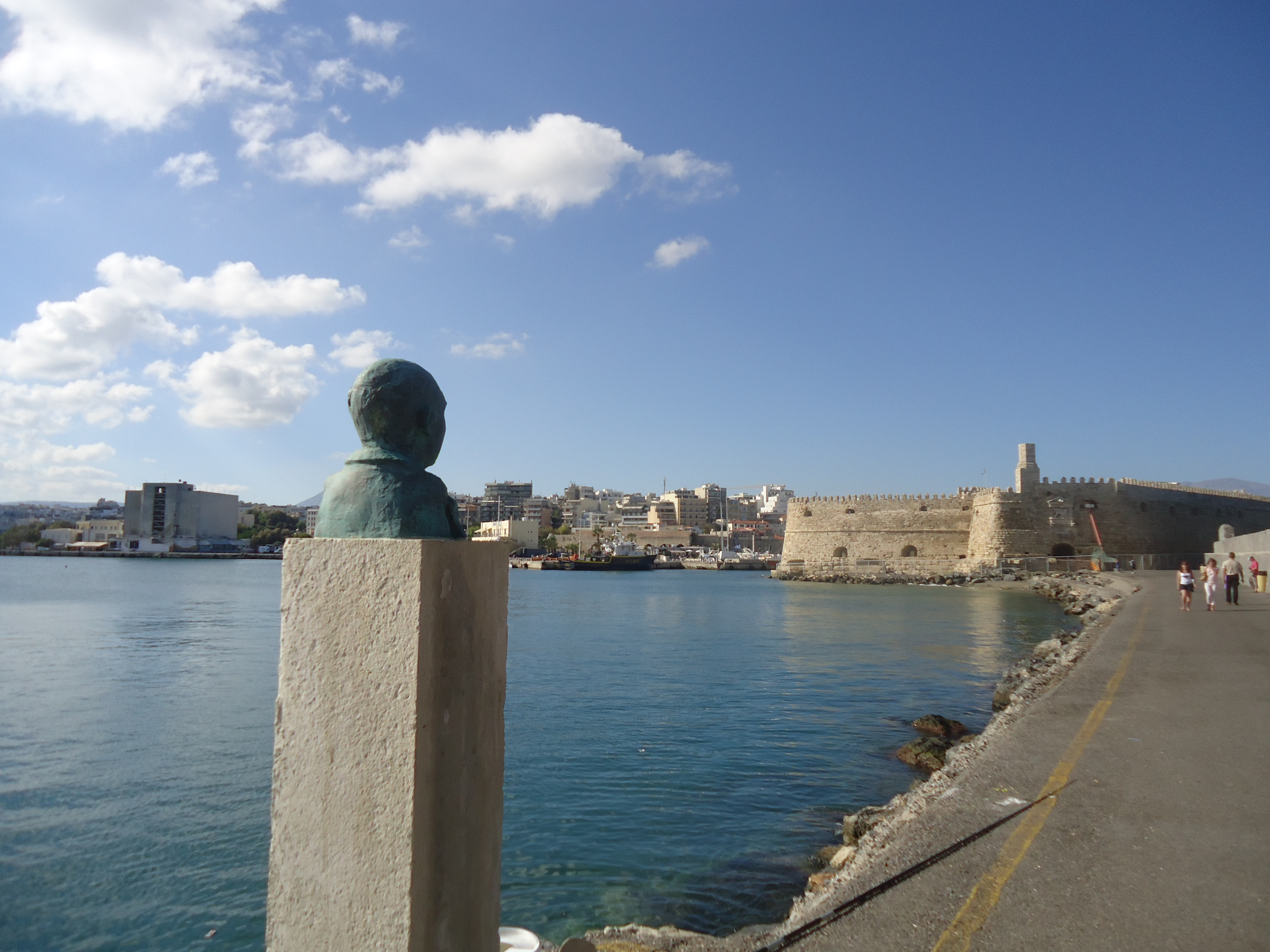
Nicolas Kitsikis statue on the forefront of Herakleion harbour

== Life ==
His father, Dimitri Kitsikis senior, was born on the island of Lesbos in 1850 and came to Athens at the age of 15 for studies. He married Kassandra, the last of 8 children, sister of Dimitri Hatsopoulos, a Member of Parliament from Karpenisi and in 1887 built a three-floor mansion in Athens. He was sent that year as chief justice to the city of Nafplio, where Nicolas was born. The son of Dimitri Hatsopoulos, Ioannis Hatsopoulos was elected full professor at the Athens Polytechnic School, while his daughter Kakia married Konstantinos Georgikopoulos, rector of the Athens Polytechnic School.

Nicolas graduated, ranking first from the Athens Polytechnic School, in 1907 and was sent to the Technische Hochschule Charlottenburg with a scholarship. In Paris, at the Sorbonne, he took courses in Mathematics under Henri Poincaré and courses in Philosophy at the College de France under Henri Bergson.

In 1911–1913 he worked in Berlin as civil engineer and in 1913 he came back to Greece as a volunteer to fight in the Second Balkan War. In 1916, at the age of 29, he was elected full professor of Statics and later of Metallic Bridges at the Athens Polytechnic School. He is considered the founder in Greece of the branch of Statics and Photodiagnosis. In 1917–1920, he was appointed general director of Public Works of the government of Eleftherios Venizelos and initiated the return to Greece of famous Greek scholars from abroad, such as Constantin Carathéodory. Along with his younger brother, the architect Kostas Kitsikis he helped in the reconstruction of Thessaloniki following the Great Fire of 1917.

In 1921–1928, as technical director of the British company McAlpine, he built the harbour of Herakleion in Crete. In recognition to this, his statue was erected on the waterfront in 2003. In that city he met his future wife, the Cretan Beata Kitsikis née Petychakis (1907–1986), of Cairo Greek Orthodox and Trieste Roman Catholic background. Beata's stepfather was Aristidis Stergiadis, the Greek high commissioner to İzmir in 1919–1922, when it was under Greek occupation. In 1948, during the Greek Civil War, Beata was condemned to death by a Greek military tribunal as a Communist fighter, even though she was not executed. After the end of the civil war, she was released from jail in late 1951.

In 1931 and again in 1935, Nicolas Kitsikis was unanimously elected president of the Technical Chamber of Greece and gave birth to the industrialization of Greece under the premiership of Eleftherios Venizelos. In 1929–1935 he served as Venizelist senator and in 1937–1945 was the technical director of the Piraeus harbour. From 1937 to 1945 he was elected vice-rector and then rector of the Polytechnic School of Athens.

His fame as a scientist was such in the interwar years that, after being honoured in 1936, with a doctorate honoris causa from TH Charlottenburg), he was invited in 1939 with his wife, just before the outbreak of the Second World War, by the German government to visit the technical achievements of the Third Reich, as a guest of Albert Speer, Hitler's architect-in-chief. As soon as the German army occupied Greece in April 1941, he was asked to build naval military installations for German submarines, in his role as the technical director of the Piraeus harbour. He refused and instead, using the immunity given to him by Count von Mirbach, the German ambassador in Athens, he organized the students of the Polytechnic School of which he was rector, in the EAM-ELAS movement of resistance to the German occupation.

After the Second World War, in the anti-communist climate of the Greek Civil War he was dismissed from all official positions as a Communist. From 1956 to 1967, he was elected a member of the Greek Parliament as one of the leaders of the pro-Communist party United Democratic Left (EDA). At a time when the People's Republic of China was not officially recognized by the Greek Government, he became the de facto ambassador of Beijing in Athens. He contributed along with his wife Beata Petychakis-Kitsikis to the spreading of the Greek Maoist movement, especially in Athens, where he was very popular. At the Athens municipal elections of 1964 he had polled first but being a member of the outlawed Greek Communist Party, because of the electoral law, Georgios Plytas, the candidate of the Right was pronounced mayor instead.

When the Regime of the Colonels took power in 1967, Kitsikis, along with many thousand other political enemies of the regime, was sent to internal exile on an island, but later was allowed to leave the country for Paris to live with his children. At his death, in Athens, in 1978, he was honored by the Chinese government.

== Nicolas Kitsikis Library and movement ==
In 1978 he was buried in the First Cemetery of Athens, with the honours of the Greek State, in presence of all tendencies of the Greek communist movement and the ambassador of the People's Republic of China. The funeral speech was delivered by Ilias Iliou.

After his death, the engineers and architects belonging to the left-wing party Synaspismos, organized the "Nicolas Kitsikis Movement". In 2003, in Herakleion, was erected the Nicolas Kitsikis Library as well as his statue in the harbour.

== Sources and further reading ==
- Νίκος Κιτσίκης, Αφιέρωμα. Athens, Technical Chamber of Greece (TEE), 1978. («Nikos Kitsikis. Hommage»)
- Ελλη Παππά – Νίκος Κιτσίκης. Ο επιστήμονας, ο άνθρωπος, ο πολιτικός. Athens, Technical Chamber of Greece (TEE), 1986. («Nikos Kitsikis: The Scientist, the Man, the Politician»)
- Εμμανουήλ Χαλκιαδάκης – Το Τεχνικό Επιμελητήριο της Ελλάδας στο Μεσοπόλεμο. Ο ρόλος του Νίκου Κιτσίκη. Athens, Technical Chamber of Greece (TEE), 2003. («The Technical Chamber of Greece between the Two World Wars. The Role of Nikos Kitsikis»)
- Μπεάτα Κιτσίκη – Γνώρισα τους Κόκκινους Φρουρούς. Athens, Kedros Press, 1982. (Beata Kitsikis. «I Knew the Red Guards»)
- Μπεάτα Κιτσίκη – Αποστολή 1963–1964. Απ'όσα είδαμε στην Κίνα. Athens, Fexis Press, 1964. (Beata Kitsikis. "1963-1964 Mission to China")
- Μπεάτα Κιτσίκη – Ματιές στην Κίνα. Athens, P. Bolaris Press, 1957. (Beata Kitsikis, "Glimpses on China")
- Γιάννης Αντωνίου – Οι Έλληνες μηχανικοί. Θεσμοί και ιδέες, 1900–1940. Αθήνα, 2006.(«The Greek Engineers. Institutions and Ideas, 1900-1940»)
- Νίκος Κιτσίκης – Η φιλοσοφία της νεώτερης φυσικής – Athens, Gutenberg, 1989 («The Philosophy of Modern Physics»)
- Δημήτρης Μπάτσης – Η βαρειά βιομηχανία στην Ελλάδα. Athens, Kedros Press, 2004 («The Heavy Industry in Greece». Introduction by Nicolas Kitsikis)
- Γυναικείες φυλακὲς Αβέρωφ. Τραγούδι πίσω απὸ τα κάγκελα. Athens, "Rizospastis", the Official daily of the Communist Party of Greece, CD, 2009 («Averof's Women Jails. Song behind Bars»). Where Beata Kitsikis was detained.
- Ολυμπία Βασιλικής Γ. Παπαδούκα, Γυναικείες φυλακές Αβέρωφ, Αθήνα, 1981 ("Averof's Women Jails").

== See also ==
China-Greece relations
