= Octave Merlier =

French philologist and intellectual

- Born: 25 October 1897; Roubaix, France
- Died: 24 July 1976 (aged 78); Athens, Greece
- Education: Sorbonne; EPHE
- Occupation: Philologist

Octave Merlier (French: [ɔktav mɛʁlje]; Greek: Οκτάβιος Μερλιέ Greek: [oˈktavios merˈʎe]; 25 October 1897 – 24 July 1976) was a French expert on the Modern Greek language.

== Biography ==
Merlier was born in Roubaix in 1897. He studied at the Sorbonne and École pratique des hautes études under the tutelage of Antoine Meillet and Joseph Vendyres.

He served as director of the French Institute of Athens from 1938 to 1961.

In 1923, he married Melpo Logotheti, noted for her collection of Modern Greek folk songs.

Merlier died in 1976 in Athens.

== Works ==
- Poèmes akritiques; La mort de Digénis: tragédie, a French translation of a poem by Angelos Sikelianos.
- Itinéraires de Jésus et chronologie dans le Quatrième Évangile, 1961)
- (with Melpo Merlier): Ο τελευταίος ελληνισμός της Μικράς Ασίας. Έκθεση του έργου του Κέντρου Μικρασιατικών Σπουδών, 1930-1973. Κατάλογος. ("The End of Greek Asia Minor: An Exposition of the Work of the Centre for Asia Minor Studies 1930-1973: catalogue", 1974)
- La vision prophétique du moine Dionysios, ou, La femme de Zante by Dionysios Solomos; French translation by Octave Merlier ("The prophetic vision of Dionysios Solomos The Monk, or the Woman of Zakynthos," 1987).
